= MacRobertson Miller Airlines =

Airline company in Western Australia

IATA	ICAO	Call sign
MV	—	Miller
- Founded: 1927
- Ceased operations: 1993
- Hubs: Perth
- Parent company: Ansett Transport Industries
- Headquarters: Perth, Western Australia
- Key people: Horrie Miller; Macpherson Robertson

MacRobertson Miller Airlines (MMA) was a Western Australian airline that operated between 1927 and 1993. It served a changing roster of destinations in Western Australia and the Northern Territory, concentrated on services between Perth and Darwin via towns in the Pilbara and Kimberley regions. After being purchased by Ansett Transport Industries in 1968, MMA grew to become Australia's third-largest airline. It gradually lost its independent identity under Ansett ownership, being eventually rebranded Ansett WA before being entirely subsumed into Ansett Australia in the early 1990s.

== History ==
In 1919, Horrie Miller purchased an Armstrong Whitworth F.K.8 from the United Kingdom and launched the Commercial Aviation Company, in Rochester, Victoria. On 8 October 1920, he registered the Commercial Aviation Company. In 1927, the Commercial Aviation Company commenced weekly Adelaide to Mount Gambier services with an Airco DH.9.

== Early years ==
The initial success of operating the DH.9 to Broken Hill made Miller seek investment to purchase a larger aircraft more suitable for regular airline service.

He approached Macpherson Robertson, who had become a millionaire on the back of his successful MacRobertson's confectionery business and was known as both a philanthropist and a supporter of aviation in Australia.

Robertson agreed to fund the purchase of a de Havilland Giant Moth single-engined eight-passenger aircraft. It would be owned by a new company, MacRobertson-Miller Aviation, formally created in May 1928. Horrie Miller would retain control of Commercial Aviation Limited while receiving a salary and a minority stake in the new MMA. The airline was run out of the MacRobertson's office in Adelaide, supported by corporate headquarters in Melbourne, which provided key administrative and legal abilities in the company's early years.

The Giant Moth aircraft was named Old Gold after one of MacRobertson's most successful chocolate bars. Always with an eye to publicity, Robertson requested that the cabin of Old Gold be filled with MacRobertson confectionery for its delivery flight to Adelaide, which was then distributed to the gathered crowd.

The first scheduled MMA service was from Adelaide to Renmark on 26 April 1928, later joined by flights to Broken Hill, Mount Gambier and Kangaroo Island, with Miller's own DH.9 being used to provide services as demand grew.

To bolster MMA's own capacity, a second aircraft was needed. Miller imported a Fokker Universal from the United States, starting a long association between MMA and the Dutch manufacturer. A flying school was also set up at Mount Gambier, using a de Havilland DH.60 Moth.

== Moving to Western Australia ==
In 1934, it was announced that the British and Australian governments would be starting an air mail service between London and Australia. This was flown by Imperial Airways between London and Singapore, and by Qantas between Brisbane, Darwin and Singapore. The Australian government also offered contracts for Australian airlines to operate domestic air mail routes linking state capitals and other key ports throughout the country with this service. These routes would be awarded a government subsidy.

Horrie Miller obtained agreement from MacRobertson that MMA should bid for the service between Perth in Western Australia and Katherine in the Northern Territory.

The MacRobertson's clerical and accounting departments were able to prepare a detailed and attractive bid that won MMA the contract despite having no presence or services in Western Australia. The air mail services were required to start in October 1934.

With the contract agreed, MacRobertson-Miller Aviation left Adelaide and transferred its operational base to Perth. Horrie Miller himself conducted a route survey from Perth, along the coastline of Western Australia, and into the Kimberley as well as setting up agents, offices, and maintenance and fuel support. There was considerable negative feeling in Western Australia about Miller's scheme, as MMA was seen as an 'outsider' displacing the pioneering West Australian Airways of Norman Brearley. After this initial survey, Miller successfully requested that the Western Australia mail contract run to Daly Waters rather than Katherine, due to that port lacking suitable ground facilities and being prone to poor weather.

The service between Perth and Daly Waters was initially operated by a trio of de Havilland Dragon light airliners. Heading north from Perth, the aircraft stopped at Geraldton, Carnarvon, Onslow, Roebourne, Whim Creek, Port Hedland, Broome, Derby, Noonkanbah, Fitzroy Crossing, Halls Creek, Ord River, Wave Hill, Victoria River and Daly Waters. The return trip called at the same ports. The trip each way took four days, with flying only in the early hours and the morning as hot air in the afternoons and frequent evening thunderstorms made flying too dangerous at other times. This route, and many of these key destinations, would become MMA's main line for the rest of its existence.

A feeder service to cattle stations in the Kimberley, Western Australia was soon started on the Ord River using a de Havilland Fox Moth. By the end of 1934, additional Dragons and Fox Moths were being purchased and shipped from Britain to handle expanding demand. In 1938, MMA acquired new, larger aircraft with better performance and range, including a pair of Lockheed Electras and two four-engined de Havilland Express. The Expresses were obtained following a new agreement between the Australian government, Qantas, and MMA, which would now see MMA's route terminate at Darwin rather than Daly Waters, providing a true – if indirect – air service through Western Australia between the capitals.

== Post-War and the Douglas DC-3 ==
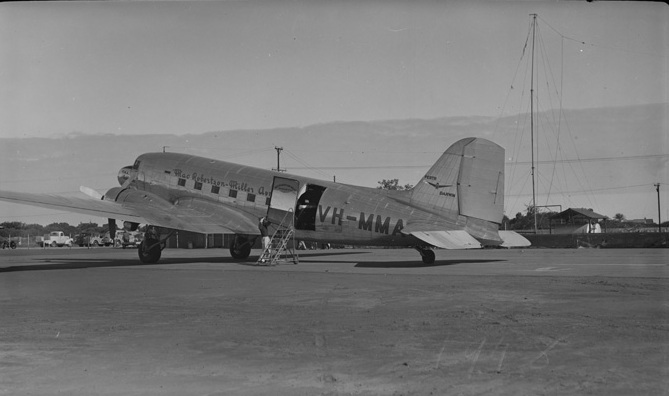
Douglas DC-3 in 1948

During World War II, MMA's services to north-western and northern Australia were curtailed, and many of its aircraft were impressed for military service. The Australian government's Department of Civil Aviation controlled the use and allocation of airliners, and several of MMA's fleet were lost in accidents. The DCA purchased a fleet of ex-military Douglas Dakotas for reviving Australian domestic air services after the war, but Macrobertson-Miller Aviation was not initially included in this allocation. After protests, a single C-47 converted to airliner specification was provided and made its first flight from Perth to Derby (via intermediate ports) in November 1945. This aircraft was transferred to TAA in 1947, by which time MacRobertson-Miller had acquired a pair of DC-3s of its own.

MMA would eventually operate nine DC-3s, all of which were ex-military C-47s or C-53s (the latter lacking the reinforced floor and larger cabin door needed for freighter operations).

Surviving Lockheed Electras were operated for a time, but the airline decided to standardise on DC-3s for its main services out of Perth to the Pilbara, Kimberley, and into Darwin. Refurbished ex-military Avro Ansons (six of which were purchased) were employed on the 'station runs' serving cattle stations in the Kimberley out of Darwin and Derby, the Pilbara out of Port Hedland, and the Goldfields out of Kalgoorlie. The Ansons also predominated on what were known as the 'mission runs', started as MMA expanded its operations beyond Darwin into the Northern Territory. These supplied and connected Christian mission stations in Arnhem Land and the Gove Peninsula with the route terminus at Groote Eylandt.

A serious incident early in MMA's post-war era occurred on 2 July 1949. DC-3 VH-MME crashed shortly after takeoff from Perth in the small hours of the morning, with the total loss of the aircraft and all 18 people on board. An investigation by the Department of Civil Aviation, a coroner's inquest, and a court of inquiry all failed to determine a definite cause of the accident, but found several definite and multiple suspected shortcomings in MMA's training, operational, and administrative systems. The most likely cause of the crash was incorrect loading of the aircraft, causing it to be longitudinally unstable, and the flight records of the manifest and load were incomplete. The DCA considered revoking MMA's operational license, but did not proceed after rapid assurances from the airline that new procedures would be implemented. MMA quickly moved to throw off the loosely formulated procedures that had grown up in its early years and during the chaotic and under-regulated war years, and to introduce formal training and checking for pilots who had learnt their trade during wartime operations under military conditions.

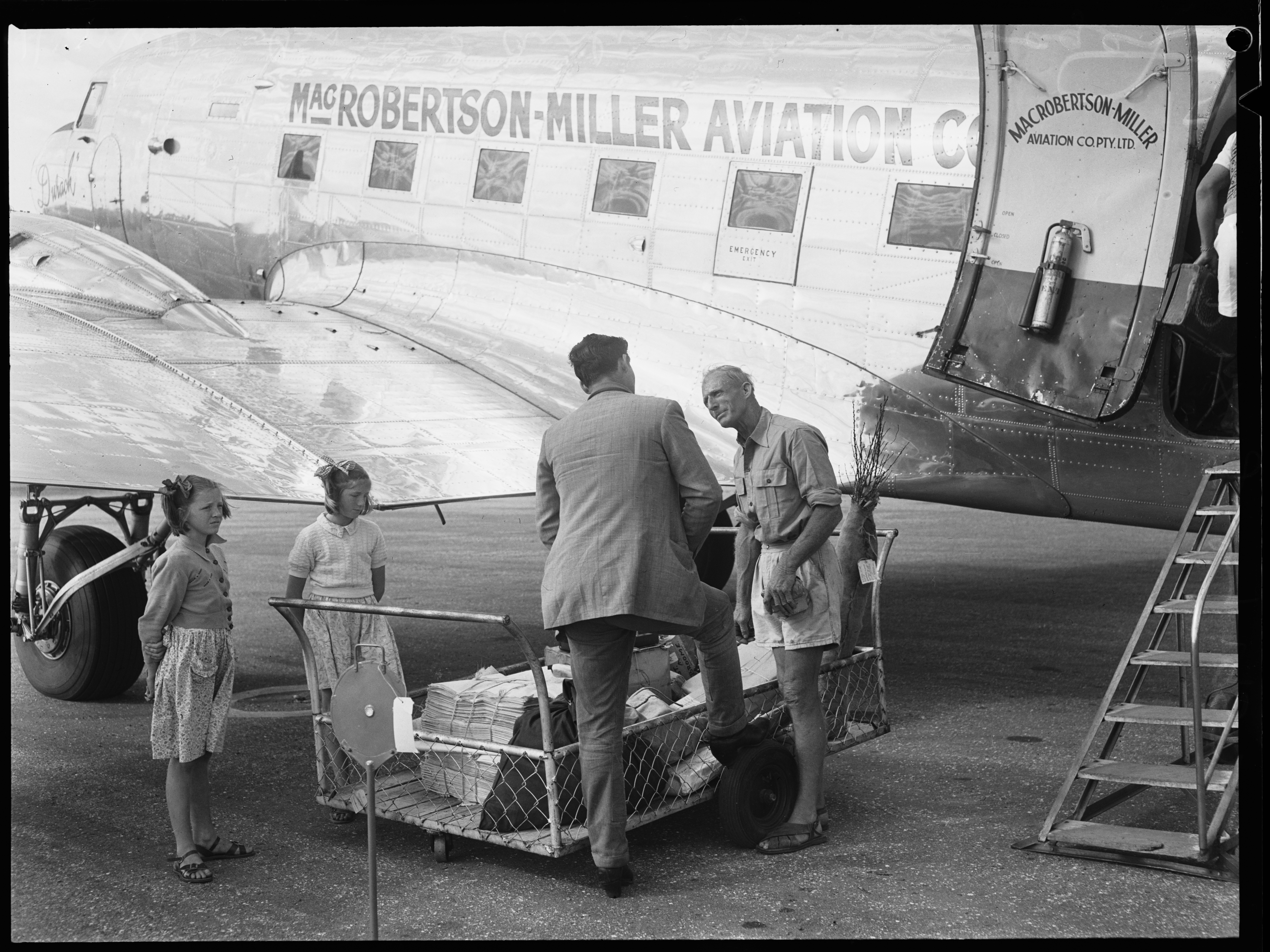
MMA with Horrie Miller, 1952

Many of MMA's distinctive characteristics were adopted at this time. Its DC-3s were all operated with a polished bare metal finish, which was calculated to reduce operating costs by removing the need to paint the aircraft and saving a small but significant amount of weight (allowing more payload and fuel to be carried). MMA crews were provided with large tins of polish and were expected to keep the aircraft buffed to a sheen during layovers while out on the route. The cleanliness of MMA aircraft, even when operated in remote rural airstrips with minimal protection or facilities, became a notable feature of the airline.

So did its high standards of maintenance and the self-sufficiency of its engineering department. Because of MMA's relative remoteness from the major Australian service hubs in Victoria and New South Wales, and how the airline's route structure could see aircraft flying over 4,000 kilometres (2,500 miles) from the engineering base in Perth, MMA engineers were, unusually, multi-licensed – apprentices were trained in all the various types of aviation engineering (such as airframe, powerplant, electrics, hydraulics, and instrumentation) rather than specialising. MMA engineering also produced a lot of incidental equipment for the airline, including a bespoke form of analog computer for calculating the weight and balance figures for the DC-3s, ground equipment such as portable steps and aircraft turntables and cabin fittings such as food trolleys and hot water vessels. MMA was the first airline to be granted Engineering Design Approval by the Department of Civil Aviation, allowing the airline an unprecedented degree of independence to adapt and modify its aircraft and maintain them with less direct oversight – a status granted due to MMA's track record of reliability and fastidious maintenance.

In the 1940s, MMA standardised the registration marks of its fleet, all of which became VH-MMx (i.e., VH-MMA, VH-MMB, VH-MMC, etc.), and its DC-3s were all named for rivers in Western Australia. MacRobertson-Miller furnished its crews with khaki army-style tunics rather than the naval-inspired uniforms favoured by most other airlines. Well into the 1950s, many of the food and drink items on MMA flights continued to come from the MacRobertson's catalogue, reflecting Macpherson Robertson's partnership in the early years of the company and the majority stake in MMA still held by the confectionery company.

In 1955, MacRobertson-Miller Aviation and its only regional competitor, Airlines (WA), merged, with MacRobertson's holding a 62% shareholding of the new company now formally titled MacRobertson Miller Airlines. The merger brought Airlines (WA)'s fleet of de Havilland Doves to MMA, which replaced the Ansons on the short station runs, with the last Anson flight for MMA being made in 1962.

The enlarged MMA inherited Airlines (WA)'s routes to the south and east of Perth to Albany and Esperance and a dense network of 'as required' local services for cattle stations, farms, and settlements in the Wheatbelt. The expanded route also included one of the shortest scheduled airline routes in the world – the hop to Rottnest Island 18 kilometres (11 miles) off the coast at Perth

After this merger, the new MacRobertson Miller Airlines operated a network of more than 32,000 kilometres (20,000 mi), from Esperance in Western Australia to Groote Eylandt in the Northern Territory.

== Air Beef ==
A distinctive part of the MMA operation between 1950 and 1962 was the Air Beef Scheme. This was the carrying of beef carcasses from Glenroy Station to the coastal port at Wyndham. Air Beef was originally founded as a partnership operation of Kimberley cattle ranchers, MMA, and Australian National Airways. Instead of driving cattle to Wyndham for slaughter (where they often arrived in poor condition), an abattoir was built at Glenroy, as well as a brand new all-weather airfield, plus maintenance facilities and accommodation for the aircraft crews. The beef would be slaughtered, wrapped, and chilled at Glenroy and flown to Wyndham, taking a matter of hours instead of the arduous six-week drive. MMA converted a DC-3 to a freighter, including removing its autopilot, sound-deadening, and (given the warm weather of the seasonal operation) its anti-ice equipment to maximise payload and allow 3 tonnes (6,720 lb) of beef to be carried on each flight, with three round trips per day. ANA withdrew from Air Beef in 1953, leaving MMA to operate the service each year with the same aircraft, and its crew would be remotely stationed at Glenroy for the entire beef season (usually from May to September) each year. In later years, crews would rotate in and out of Glenroy. The service ended in 1962 when road improvements in the Kimberley made it more cost-effective to transport live cattle to coastal abattoirs by road.

== Turboprops and Ansett ==
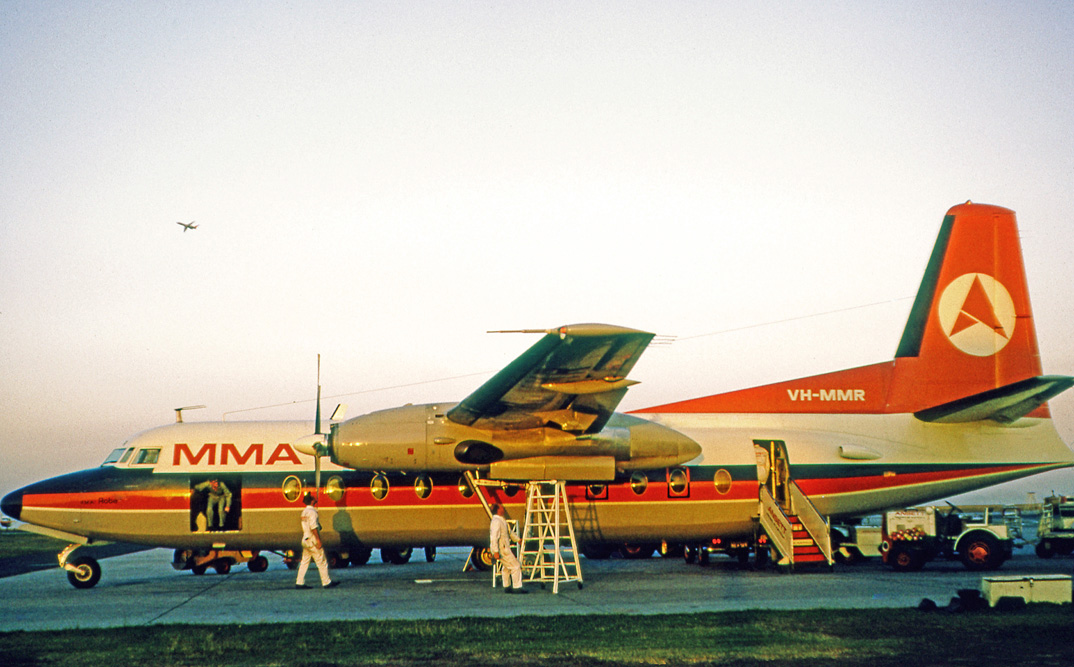
Fokker F27 at Essendon Airport in 1971

From the time of the merger with Airlines (WA), the newly structured MMA began looking at the introduction of turboprop aircraft to accelerate its long-range services – it still being a journey of two full days on the Perth-Darwin 'main line'. In 1959, it was agreed that MMA would take over an order for a Fokker F27 from Trans Australia Airlines, with it entering service in December 1959. With the F27, the main line journey could be accomplished in a single day, with more comfortable cruising at high altitudes thanks to cabin pressurization and, for the first time on MMA services, hot meals served in-flight. With MMA unable to acquire further F27s at the same favourable price as VH-MMS, that one aircraft ran all of MMA's services between Perth and Darwin, while the DC-3 fleet took on slower services with more stops and the 'branch' runs on MMA's timetable. In keeping with its unique speed and service, RMA Swan was painted in a new dark blue/white/light blue livery and branding as the 'Jetstream Service'. The introduction of turboprop operations also saw the launch of a new red MMA logo and insignia showing a black swan (the state bird of Western Australia and also representing the aircraft's namesake, the Swan River that flowed through MMA's home port of Perth). As MMA's only turboprop, it was operated with the lowest possible downtime for maintenance and servicing, averaging over ten flying hours per day and recording over 3,000 flying hours in its first year of operation.

The operational success of the first MMA F27 was clear, but MMA still needed additional finances to order more F27s. At the same time, MacRobertson's was looking to sell its shares in MMA to fund its core confectionery business. Reg Ansett, owner of Ansett Transport Industries, had been building up his company into a major national player in the late 1950s. Ansett purchased ANA in 1957 (creating Ansett-ANA) and key regional airlines in New South Wales and South Australia. Seeing the opportunity to move into Western Australia, Ansett purchased MacRobertson's holding in MMA and also bought out the shares held by founder Horrie Miller, resulting in Ansett owning 70% of MMA from April 1963.

The purchase opened up new funds to acquire more F27s for Ansett. In the interim, F27s were leased from the existing Ansett-ANA fleet and from Philippine Airlines to take up the booming traffic levels on MMA's routes in the early 1960s. One F27 was permanently transferred from Ansett to MMA in 196,4 and two new-build aircraft arrived in 1966 and 1968.

== The Mining Boom ==
Ansett's purchase was well-timed, as Western Australia was about to undergo a huge increase in traffic as large-scale mining operations in the Pilbara began. The Goldsworthy mine began operations in 1965, exporting iron ore from Port Hedland (later joined by the mine at Newman) while the Mount Tom Price mine began operations in 1966, exporting via Dampier and Karratha. Oil production at Barrow Island started in 1964. Also, 1963 saw the agreement to construct the Naval Communication Station Harold E. Holt at Exmouth, while up in Kimberley, the Ord River Irrigation Scheme had begun in 1960, promising an agricultural boom.

In the Northern Territory, the old 'mission runs', originally requiring numerous stops in remote, unfurnished airstrips to support small settlements and Christian missions, were being replaced by scheduled services to supply the new bauxite mining operations. The Nabalco facility at Gove started up in 1964, as did the Groote Eylandt Mining Company manganese ore mine at Groote Eylandt.

All these activities brought a surge of traffic over MMA's routes, leaving the DC-3s working to capacity. In 1964, MMA reported that its fleet accumulated over 87,000 flight hours, carried nearly 70,000 passengers, over 3,000 tonnes (6.7 million pounds) of air freight and 180 tonnes (400,000 lb) of air mail. With Ansett ownership came funds to order more Fokker F27s as well as short-term leases of F27s and Douglas DC-4s from Ansett-ANA. MMA would eventually build a fleet of six F27s, with the DC-3s gradually being retired and the remaining fleet being relegated to freight, short-haul 'station runs', aerial survey work, and charter operations.

MMA also purchased an eight-seater Piaggio P.166 for serving the oil operations on Barrow Island and carrying survey and inspection teams for mines. Three Twin Otters were operated to serve mining operations at Yampi Sound, Tom Price and the traditional station runs in the Kimberley. The Piaggio was officially owned and operated by the Commercial Aviation Company – Horrie Miller's original air service that he started in 1919. It had been acquired as part of Ansett's purchase of MMA and folded into the larger company, and was now used for accountancy purposes to distinguish these distinctly different operations.

In 1966, a statement by MMA declared it had become Australia's third-largest domestic airline (behind Ansett-ANA and TAA), serving 97 destinations and carrying over 100,000 passengers that year. MMA's timetabled route mileage now slightly exceeds that of Ansett-ANA. Freight tonnage carried by MMA had increased by over 50% in 1965–66.

The growth of towns in the Pilbara changed the flow of traffic for MMA – instead of relying on the mail contracts between Perth and Darwin, with intermediate stops largely by necessity, locations like Port Hedland, Karratha, and Kununurra became major traffic centres in their own right. The performance of the F27s enabled Perth to become a hub rather than a terminus, with more direct services fanning out to key destinations. This was coupled to changes in Australian aviation legislation that enabled the growth of 'third level' commercial operators – smaller firms operating local and regional services with lighter aircraft. There were also, often as a direct result of the industrialisation of much of Western Australia, ever-improving road networks in previously remote areas. These factors all enabled MMA to greatly reduce the once-numerous 'station runs' and focus on the main routes between Perth and Darwin via the Pilbara. This change also saw the removal of the former Airlines (WA) eastward services to Albany and Esperance. Exceptions included the long-running service between Perth and Kalgoorlie (itself seeing booming production at the Fimiston open pit) and the coastal route from Perth to Geraldton and Carnarvon – a remnant of the original air mail route from 1934.

== MMA and the Jet Age ==
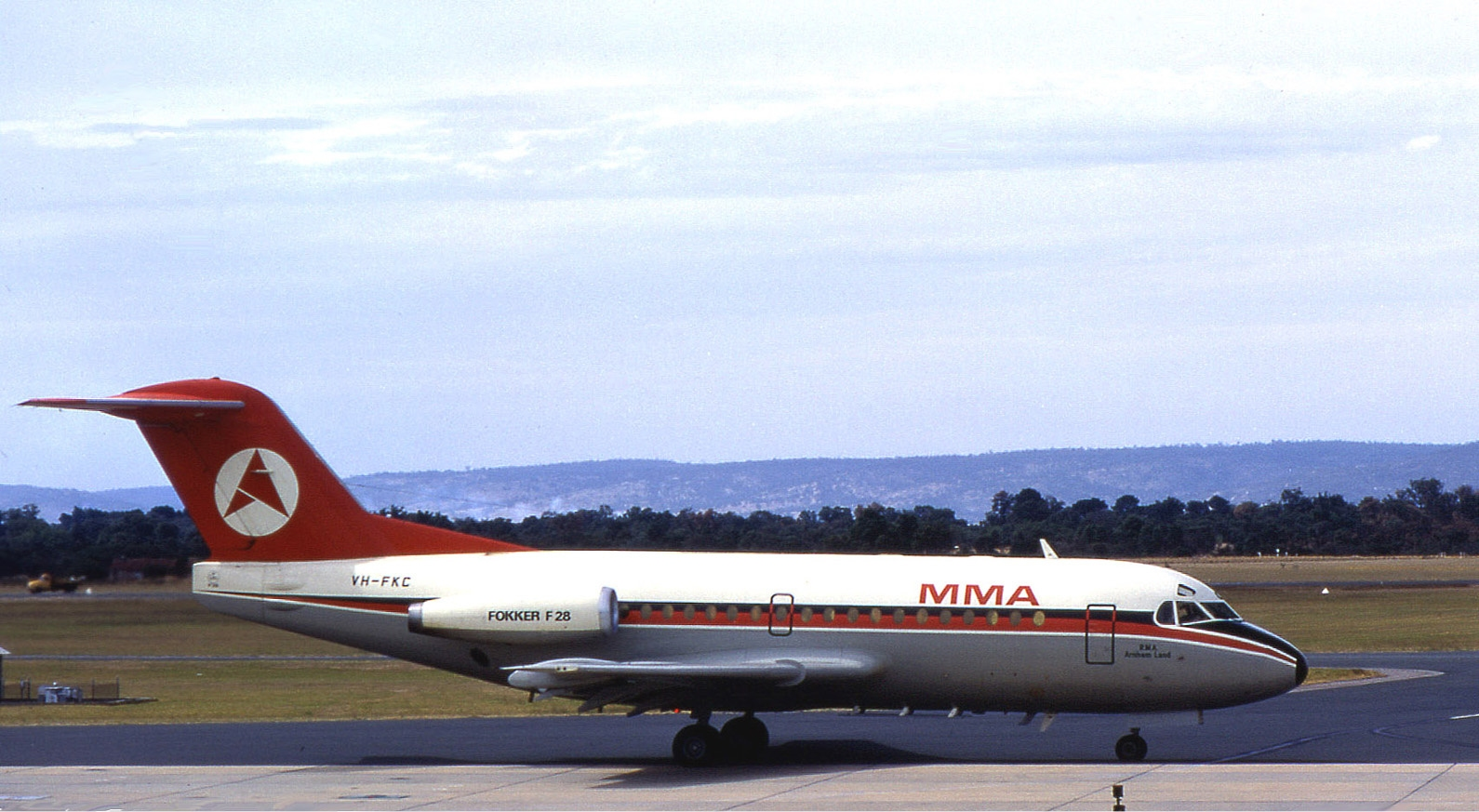
Fokker F28 at Perth

With this new traffic in mind, and faced with continually growing traffic, MMA began preparations to begin jet operations with the Fokker F28.

In the interim, MMA took on the operation of a Vickers Viscount from Ansett-ANA in 1968. These four-engined turboprops provided much-needed capacity, as well as having performance similar to that expected from the F28. Viscount operations suddenly ended after the fatal crash of MacRobertson Miller Airlines Flight 1750, found to be caused by structural corrosion.

In November 1968, Ansett took full ownership of MMA, with the remaining 30% purchased. Aircraft were gradually repainted into Ansett's new white/red/black scheme. The absorption into Ansett reflected a general move by the parent firm to integrate its regional subsidiaries into its operations and identity.

The last official scheduled MMA DC-3 flight was made in January 1969, and MMA was then able to proclaim that it ran an all-jet fleet (turboprop F27s and Twin Otters and the upcoming F28 jetliner – the single Piaggio being operated only on a charter basis). One DC-3 used for the Air Beef operations was retained for charter work until March 1970.

MMA's orders for Fokker F28 jets were not expected to be delivered until the middle of 1970, but with the unexpected loss of the Viscounts, there was a shortfall in capacity for 1969. MMA agreed on a 10-month lease of an F28 with an earlier spot in the construction queue with its destined owner, Norwegian airline Braathens, making its first scheduled service for MMA on 2 September 1969 from Perth to Port Hedland.

The first of MMA's own F28 order entered service in June 1970. Ansett ordered five 65-seat F28-1000s, four of which were originally destined for MMA and the other was allocated to Airlines of New South Wales. Traffic in NSW did not develop as expected and the jet was uneconomical to operate, so this aircraft was transferred to MMA in 1971 and by the end of 1972 all of MMA's F27s had been retired. The Twin Otters and the sole Piaggio were retired in 1977, ending the 'station run' services and turning MMA into a single-type all-jet airline. The old 'mission runs' in Arnhem Land, and the Gove Peninsula were taken over by Mission Aviation Fellowship, replaced on MMA's schedules by direct flights to and from Gove and Groote Eylandt, by F28s that would otherwise be on layover at Darwin between services from and to Perth.

MMA's operations with the F28 became notable for being high-intensity jet operations into what were relatively underdeveloped airports. Until well into the 1980s, the only airport served by MMA between Perth and Darwin with its own air traffic control operation was Port Hedland (established with the introduction of VH-MMJ in 1969). There were no en route ATC services and no radar coverage outside the main hubs at each end of the route. Before 1977 (when TAA began flying between Perth and Darwin via Port Hedland), Western Australia did not have charted airways north of Perth. MMA's F28s, operating at 30,000 ft (9,100 m) or more and a ground speed of over 400 knots (740 km/h), were operated with methods little changed since the days of the DC-3, with basic VOR and NDB radio navigation, high frequency communication and standard separation rules under the responsibility of the aircrews.

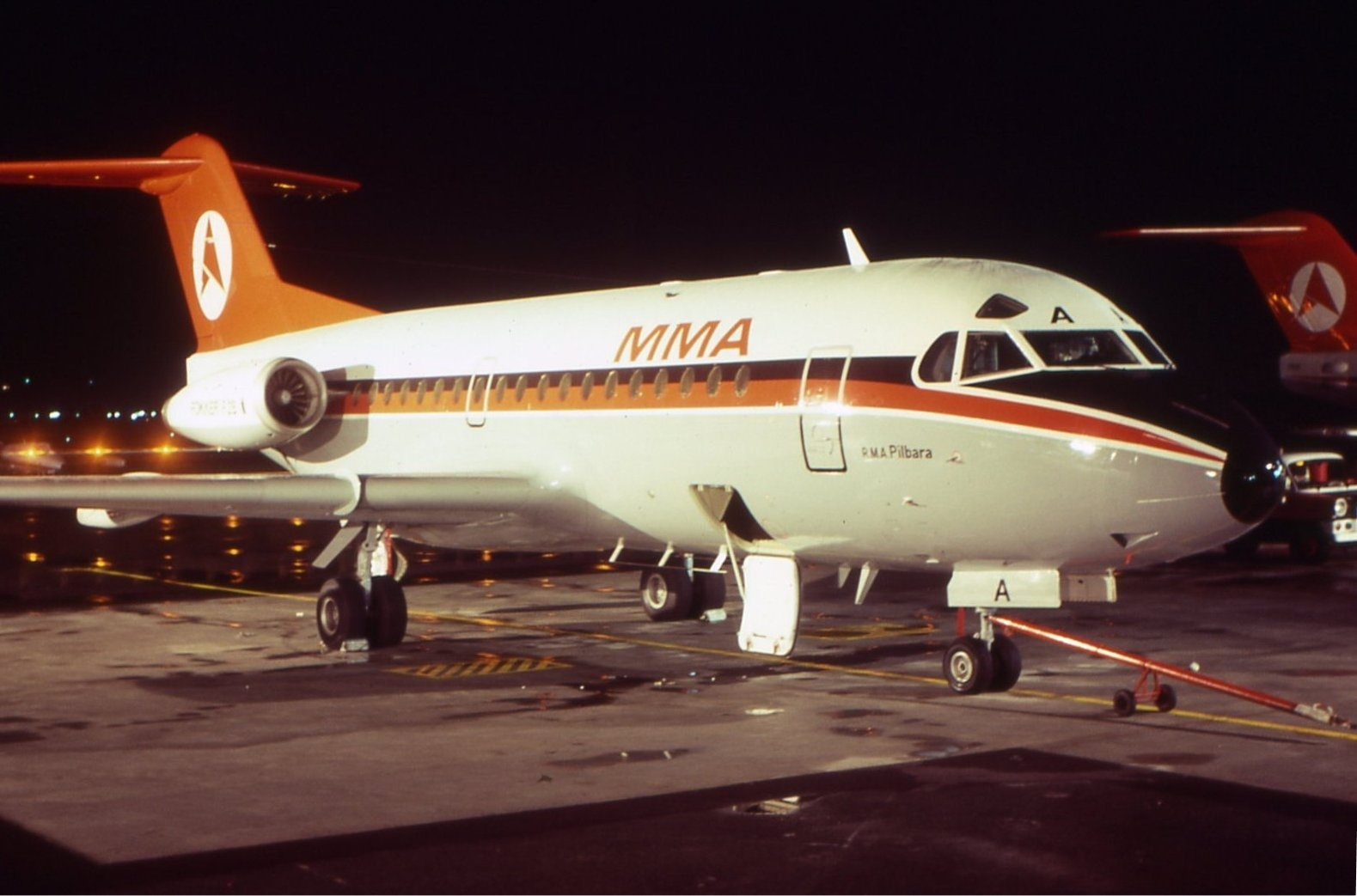
Fokker F28 at Perth Airport in the early 1980s

Approaches into small airports were made without ATC using traditional traffic patterns in clear weather and non-precision instrument approaches in poor weather. The performance of the F28 did reveal some shortcomings in the operational support available to the airline via the Department of Civil Aviation; the famous Fitzroy Crossing forced landing of 1971 was caused in major part by the ability of the F28 to 'outfly' the weather forecasts available in the region, with forecasts not being prepared or transmitted with sufficient frequency for jet operations.

Once MacRobertson-Miller's fleet consisted solely of F28s, the company's 1977 report stated that it had 81 pilots to fly its six jet aircraft. The fleet collectively flew approximately 30,000 km (18,600 miles) each day, with each aircraft being airborne for at least 8.5 hours a day on average. It was estimated that at no point during a typical weekly schedule were all the F28s on the ground at the same time. The company's F28 fleet was one of the most utilised aircraft on the planet, with an average airframe utilisation rate well above 90% throughout the late 1970s and early 80s.

In 1977, MMA made its first international flights, on tourist charter runs between Port Hedland and Bali in Indonesia. These flights ceased when the Department of Transport reaffirmed that Qantas would be Australia's flag carrier and the only regulated passenger airline permitted to operate to overseas destinations.

Continuing traffic growth on MMA's routes led to the purchase of a sixth F28-1000, which made its first flight for MMA in December 1980. This was a second-hand aircraft, and one of the oldest F28s flying, having entered service with Martinair in 1969.

== End of MMA ==
In 1979 Reg Ansett lost control of Ansett Transport Industries following a takeover by Peter Abeles' Thomas Nationwide Transport and News Limited. Abeles ended up in day-to-day charge of Ansett, and the new owners pursued a policy of renewing the company's image. The core national Ansett business received a new livery, and the various regional operations would revert to their registered names, such as Airlines of New South Wales and Airlines of South Australia. However, in order to provide consistency with this new scheme, it was decided to end the use of the MacRobertson Miller Airlines brand.

From July 1980, MMA became Airlines of Western Australia, with a new white/red/green livery and a logo of a stylised kangaroo paw, the state flower of Western Australia. The traditional airline code of 'MV' and the 'Millers' radio callsign were retained.

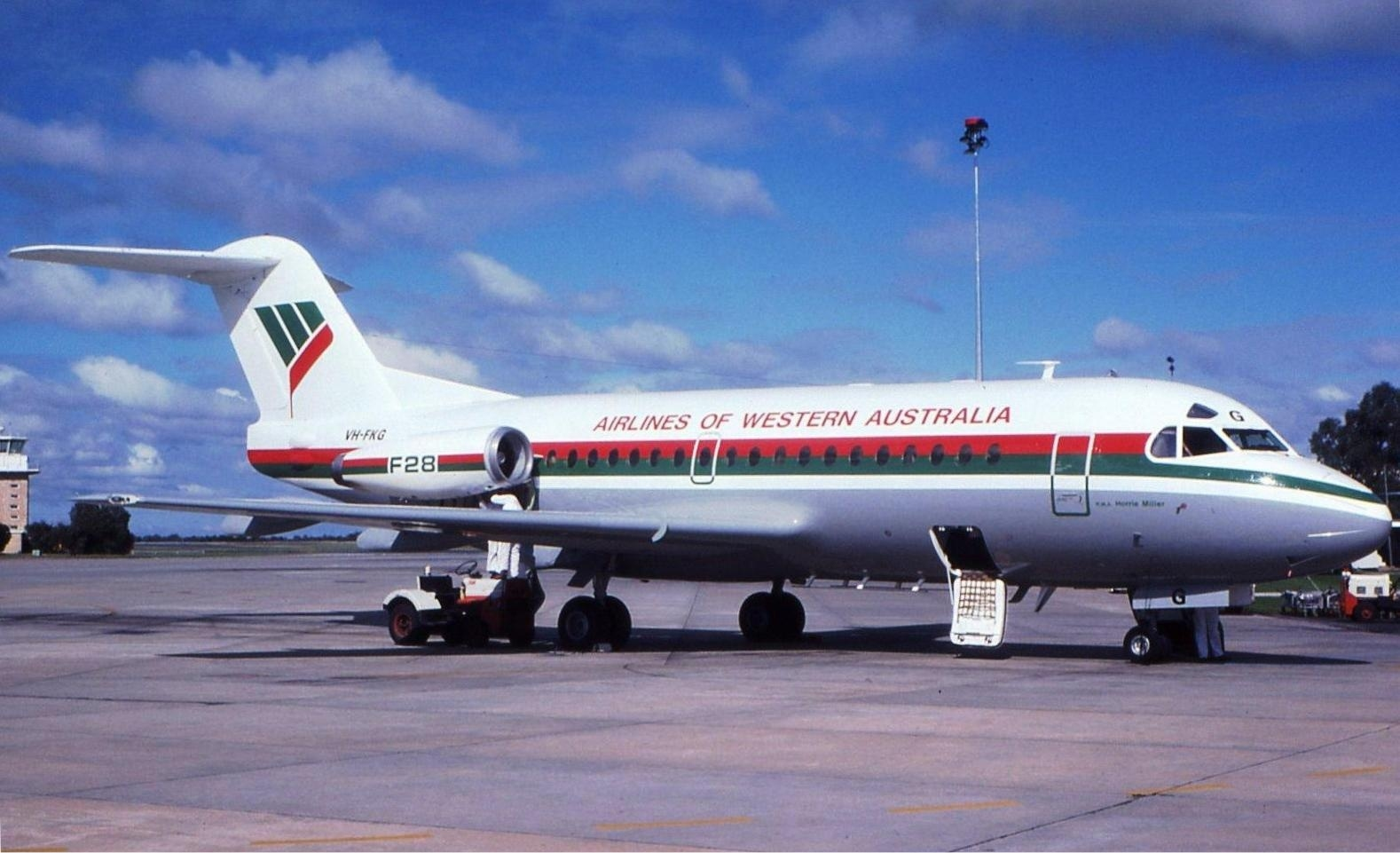
Fokker F28 at Perth in Airlines of Western Australia livery

Growth continued for the airline in its new form, with an additional F28-1000 being purchased second-hand and soon joined by a brand new pair of larger F28-4000s (with 85 seats) being delivered in 1982. Closer integration with Ansett brought to an end the tradition of naming aircraft after Western Australian rivers and regions as AWoA was gradually brought into line with the broader Ansett policy which eschewed naming aircraft. VH-FKG was instead named RMA Horrie Miller after the MMA founder and pioneer pilot who had died the previous year.

To cater to the boom in international tourism to the Central Australia of Australia, Airlines of Western Australia added services between Darwin, Alice Springs and Ayers Rock to its schedules. Some of these flights were AoWA operations, but many were codeshare flights with another newly branded Ansett subsidiary, Airlines of Northern Australia, which did not have its own jet fleet and so its premier services were run by AoWA aircraft, crews, and operational staff.

Shortly after the rebranding, AoWA began regular charter flights to Christmas Island and the Cocos Islands from Learmonth. These were over-water legs totalling over 2,200 kilometres (1,200 nmi).

More corporate changes at Ansett led to a further change of identity in October 1984, with the airline becoming Ansett WA (in line with the other Ansett subsidiaries), and the fleet was gradually repainted into the white/blue 'Southern Cross' livery of its parent company. One of Ansett WA's aircraft was painted with Ansett NT titles to reflect and promote the airline's joint operations in the Northern Territory. Despite this branding, the aircraft remained entirely on the Perth-based Ansett WA roster and was used freely throughout the route network. Equally, the other WA-branded aircraft in the fleet regularly operated on routes and to destinations in the Northern Territory as the timetable required.

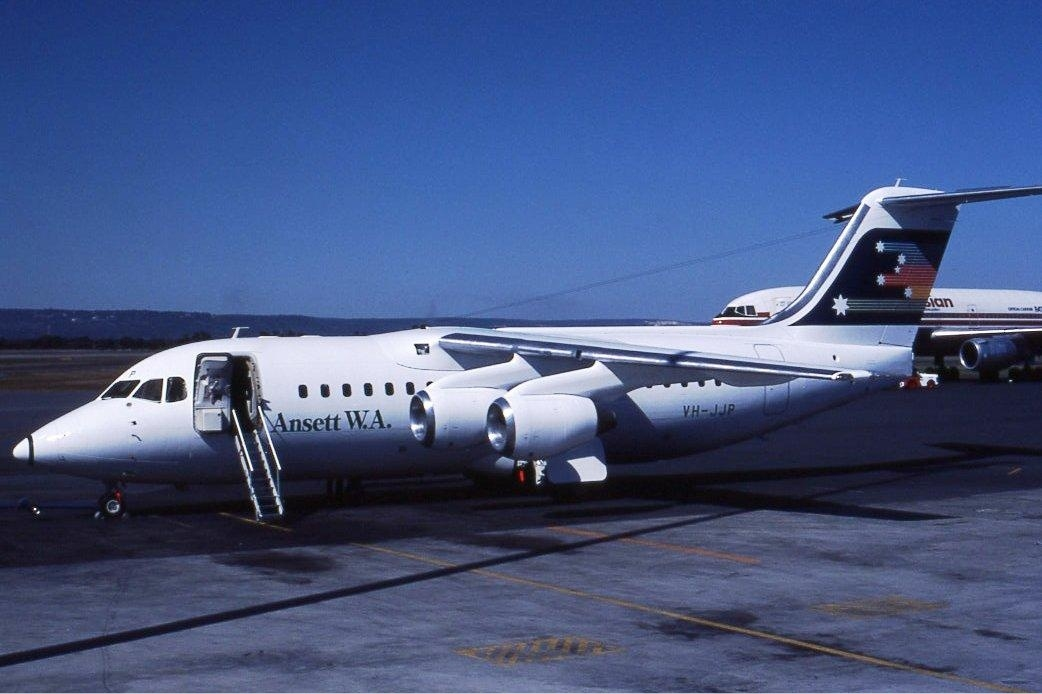
BAe 146 VH-JJP in the colours of Ansett WA in the late 1980s

Ansett WA's fleet was bolstered by the introduction of British Aerospace 146 quad-jets, seven of which were introduced between 1985 and 1993 with an aim of both adding capacity and retiring the older Fokker jets. The BAe146s cruised slightly lower and slower than the F28, but with 100 seats, carried more passengers and burnt less fuel. The BAe146 had more range than the F28, allowing Ansett WA to roster direct flights where the F28 would require an intermediate stop, such as between Perth and Alice Springs. They also featured six-abreast seating, which Ansett saw as a selling point for its regional operations since this was a layout usually seen on larger aircraft, especially Ansett's expanding fleet of Boeing 737s.

Ansett's regional subsidiaries were subsumed into the common Ansett Australia branding in December 1993, at which point the operational, corporate, and legal entity that had been MMA was wrapped up. The ex-MMA F28s were redeployed to Ansett's regional services in New South Wales, joining the F28s inherited from Ansett's purchase of East-West Airlines, and all were withdrawn from Ansett service in the mid-1990s. The Ansett WA BAe146s remained on the ex-MMA network in Western Australia until Ansett Australia's collapse in September 2001.

== Aircraft ==
MacRobertson Miller Airlines fleet
Aircraft	Number	In service	Passengers	Notes
de Havilland Giant Moth	1	1928-1931	8	Named Old Gold.Sold to Norman Brearley
Fokker Universal	1	1929-1939	6	Built in the US in 1927 by Atlantic Aircraft
de Havilland DH.60 Moth	1	1929-1930	1	Used for flight training at Mount Gambier
de Havilland Dragon	5	1934-1942	6	
Lockheed Vega	1	1935-1941	6	Originally purchased for entry in the MacRobertson Air Race
de Havilland Fox Moth	3	1935-1941	3	
de Havilland Express	2	1938-1940	10	
Lockheed Model 10 Electra	2	1938-1948	10	
Avro Anson	6	1946-1962	7	All refurbished ex-Royal Australian Air Force
Douglas DC-3	12	1945-1970	28	All refurbished C-47/C-53s, three were short-term transfers from Ansett
de Havilland Dove	3	1955-1967	8	Acquired in the merger with Airlines (WA)
Fokker F27	8	1955-1972	36	
Piaggio P.166	1	1964-1977	8	Used for surveying and charter work supporting the development of mining operations
de Havilland Canada DHC-6 Twin Otter	3	1967-1978	20	
Vickers Viscount	2	1968	65	Leases from Ansett, operations curtailed after the crash of MMA 1750
Fokker F28-1000	8	1969-1993	65	One purchased after the renaming to Airlines of Western Australia
Fokker F28-4000	2	1982-1993	85	Purchased as Airlines of Western Australia
British Aerospace 146-200	7	1985-1993	100	Purchased as Ansett WA

Thanks to a combination of the long legs flown between destinations in the sparsely-inhabited Pilbara region, an effective rostering and operations system and a well-honed practice of short turnarounds (usually 25 minutes, as is now typical on modern low-cost carriers), the airline's Fokker aircraft had some of the highest utilisation rates in the world and accumulated some of the highest mileages. In 1965, the company's F27s averaged 4150 flight hours. The first F27 purchased by the airline, registered VH-MMS and named RMA Swan, became the first F27 in the world to reach 10,000 flight hours and later the first to accumulate 20,000 hours. It flew over 40,000 hours with MMA, setting another world record for an F27 with a daily utilisation average of 10.66 hours, before being redeployed to parent company Ansett Australia in 1972. The latter Fokker F28 fleet was also distinguished by extremely high utilisation – F28 VH-FKA RMA Pilbara became the first of the type to fly 20,000 and 30,000 hours and logged nearly 63,000 hours before it was withdrawn in 1995. The fleet averaged 8.5 flying hours per day in the mid-1970s. Aircraft on the main route between Perth and Darwin via four or five airports in the Pilbara, and with services to Gove and Groote Eylandt in the Northern Territory before making the return flight via the same ports of call, would take just over 22 hours to make the round trip, of which over 13 hours was spent in the air.

MMA's F28s flew what was at the time the world's longest twinjet route, and certainly the world's longest F28 flight – Perth to Derby. In the 1980s, as Ansett WA, some of the F28 fleet were fitted with extra fuel tanks to increase their range (matching the BAe146), which allowed longer flights direct from Kununurra to Perth – a flight time of 3 1/4 hours. According to the 5 April 1970 MMA system timetable, the airline was operating F28 jet service into Dampier, Darwin, Derby, Kununurra, Perth, and Port Hedland at this time. MMA also flew one of the world's shortest scheduled air services, from Perth to Rottnest Island flying the Douglas DC-3 and later the Fokker F27. MMA's first F28 was leased from Braathens of Norway and returned to Fokker after the first of the ordered aircraft arrived. One was originally purchased for Ansett division Airlines of New South Wales but transferred to MMA when it proved uneconomical on the NSW intrastate routes.

== Accidents and incidents ==
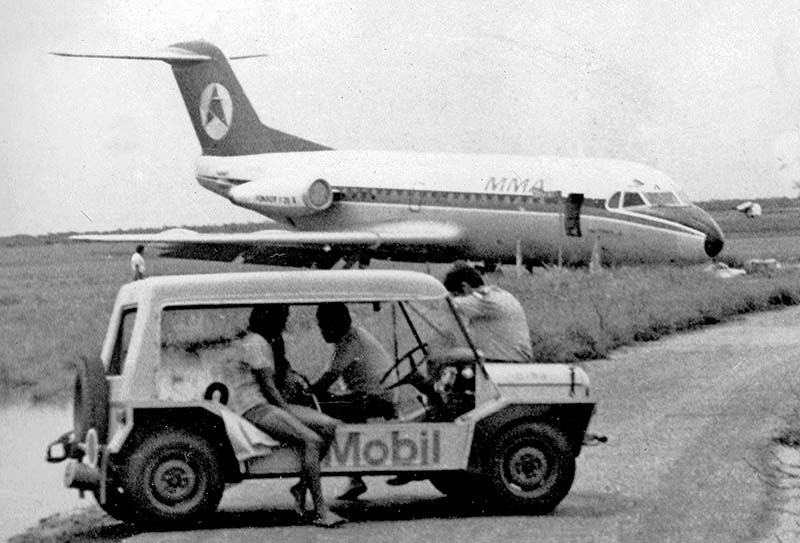
Fokker F28 bogged at Broome Airport in January 1974

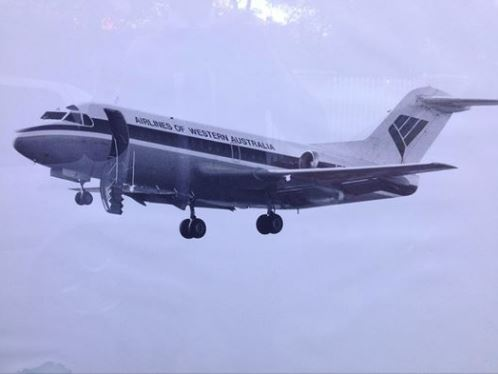
Fokker F28 with door open in September 1983

- On 1 July 1949, Douglas DC-3 "Fitzroy" on a scheduled flight to Darwin and carrying 14 passengers and a crew of 4 crashed after take-off from Perth in heavy rain. The aircraft crashed into an area of disused army huts north of Guildford that was directly in line with Perth Airport's major runway 21/03. It is believed to have been caused by the aircraft being incorrectly loaded.
- On 31 December 1968, Vickers Viscount "Quininup" VH-RMQ leased from Ansett-ANA broke up in mid-air and crashed 52 kilometres (32 mi) south of Port Hedland Airport in the scrub on Indee Station. Twenty-two passengers and the four crew on board were killed. The aircraft was originally purchased by Trans Australia Airlines.
- Fokker F28 Flight MV 372 Perth to Port Hedland – 30 July 1971, VH-FKC: During the long, late-night hop, destination and onward airports became blanketed with fog. The F28 became dangerously low on fuel, and after circling for some time, Captain Harold Rowell considered ditching the aircraft in the ocean. However, he eventually landed the jet on a gravel runway in the isolated town of Fitzroy Crossing, landing with less than ten minutes of fuel remaining. No life was lost, and no injury occurred.
- Fokker F28s of MMA assisted with the evacuation of Darwin after Cyclone Tracy in December 1974. One F28-1000 carried 128 evacuees, mostly children, on a flight to Perth, though most aircraft carried 80, 20 more than the standard 60 passengers. The MMA F28s helped evacuate 1,250 people out of Darwin in four days.
- On 17 January 1974, Fokker F-28-1000 VH-FKA operating Flight MV 492 (a Perth to Darwin milk run with four stops) overran the runway at Broome Airport. The weather was wet, and the aircraft overran the runway threshold by 82 metres (269 ft), crashing through a wire and picket fence before stopping with the nosewheel sunk in mud. There were no injuries and some minor damage to the aircraft's nosewheel doors, a fuselage-mounted landing light, and the oxygen access panel.
- On 26 September 1983, Fokker F28 VH-FKA took off from Perth Airport on a routine flight to the North West. As the aircraft banked left after takeoff on Runway 21, the main passenger door/airstairs suddenly opened. The air hostess sitting in the jump seat adjacent to the door lost her shoes. The door had been closed, but the lock bar had not been moved to the upright "lock" position. Ground crew also failed to see that the outside door release (aft of the door on the fuselage) was not in the correct horizontal position. The co-pilot also failed to see that the door "unlatched" light (which was orange in colour) had remained on. This check formed part of the pre-taxi checklist. However, bright sunlight glare through the starboard cockpit windows made it difficult to see that the light was on. The door fell open as the cabin pressure increased and as the aircraft climbed and banked left. The aircraft circled for two hours above Perth, burning fuel before making a safe landing.

== General references ==
- Dunn, Frank (1984). Speck in the sky: A History of Airlines of Western Australia. Perth, Western Australia: Airlines of W.A. ISBN 978-0-95908230-2.
