= Geraldton Airport =

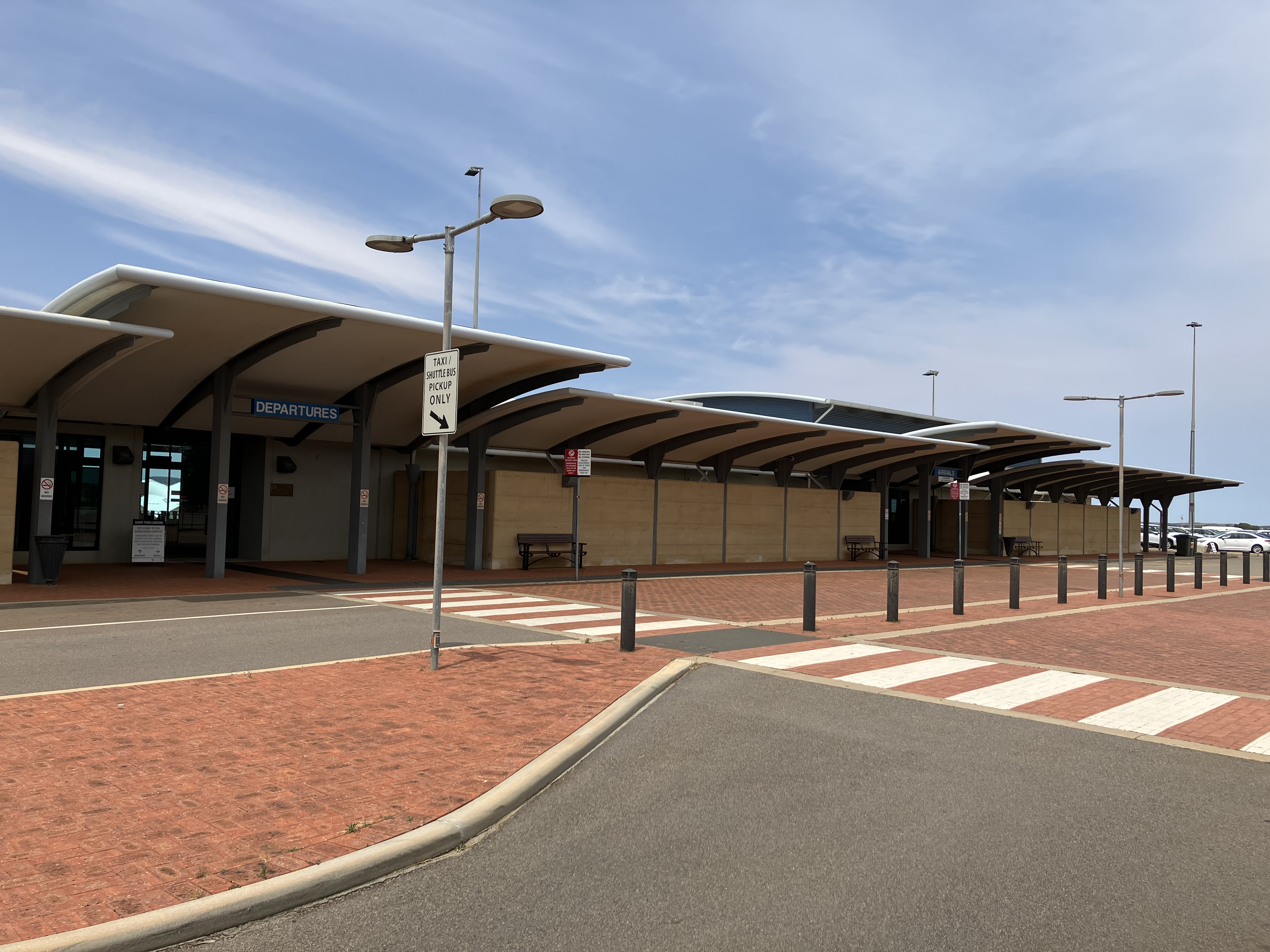
- Geraldton Airport main terminal, October 2023
- IATA: GET; ICAO: YGEL

Summary
- Airport type: Public
- Owner/Operator: City of Greater Geraldton
- Serves: Geraldton
- Location: Moonyoonooka, Western Australia
- Opened: 5 Dec 1921
- Elevation AMSL: 121 ft / 37 m
- Coordinates: 28°47′47″S 114°42′22″E
- Website: airport.cgg.wa.gov.au

Map
- Location in Western Australia

Runways
Direction	Length		Surface
Direction	m	ft	Surface
03/21	2,400	7,874	Asphalt
08/26	900	2,953	Gravel
14/32	844	2,769	Asphalt

Statistics (2021/22)
- Passengers: 80,374
- Aircraft movements: 1,238
- Sources: Australian AIP and aerodrome chart Passenger and aircraft movements from the BITRE

Geraldton Airport (IATA: GET, ICAO: YGEL) is an airport located 6 nautical miles (11 km; 6.9 mi) east of Geraldton, Western Australia, in Moonyoonooka along the Geraldton – Mount Magnet Road.

During 2020–2022, on average 65,861 passengers used the airport annually, down from 110,630 for the 3 years prior (2017–2019), a drop attributable to the COVID-19 pandemic.

== Background ==
Geraldton Airport is the general aviation and regular passenger transport airport for the City of Greater Geraldton and surrounding area, meeting varying transport, industrial and commercial interests across the Mid West region.

Geraldton Airport is the main regional base for aircraft charter operations, flight training, private flying, aerial and agricultural work and aircraft maintenance in the Mid West region.

The closest significant aerodromes are Mullewa, 100 km (62 mi) to the east or Kalbarri 100 km (62 mi) to the north and for larger jet operations Perth Airport, 370 km (230 mi) to the south.

== Air services ==
=== Airlines and destinations ===
Geraldton Airport has daily regular public transport (RPT) services to and from Perth, provided by QantasLink using Airbus A320 and Fokker 100 aircraft, and Nexus Airlines with Dash 8 Q400 aircraft.

Airlines	Destinations
Nexus Airlines	Broome, Karratha, Perth, Port Hedland
QantasLink	Perth

=== Charter and general aviation ===
Geraldton Airport is the base for several general aviation flying training and charter operators, namely;

- Shine Aviation Services
- Geraldton Air Charter, who purchased Abrolhos Air Services in 2002 and incorporated into business.
- FlyGero
- Mid West Aero Club
- OM Helicopters

Shine Aviation Services conduct flying training and utilise a gazetted low flying training area to the south east of the airport. Shine Aviation Services are also a major fly-in fly-out operator in the region.

Midwest Aviation conduct aircraft maintenance and have aircraft engineers.

Bristow Helicopters provide offshore support services to drill companies exploring offshore from Dongara.

Local charter operations from Geraldton Airport providing fly-in fly-out services include Shine Aviation to Golden Grove Mine, Mount Magnet and Jack Hills.

Virgin Australia operates to Boolgeeda Airport from Geraldton for Rio Tinto, using F100 and 737 aircraft. Network Aviation (branded as QantasLink), Cobham Aviation, Skippers Aviation, Alliance Airlines and several smaller airlines operate charters to various sites on a non regular basis.

Shine Aviation, Geraldton Air Charter and FlyGero offer fixed wing charters and scenic flights to the Abrolhos Islands.

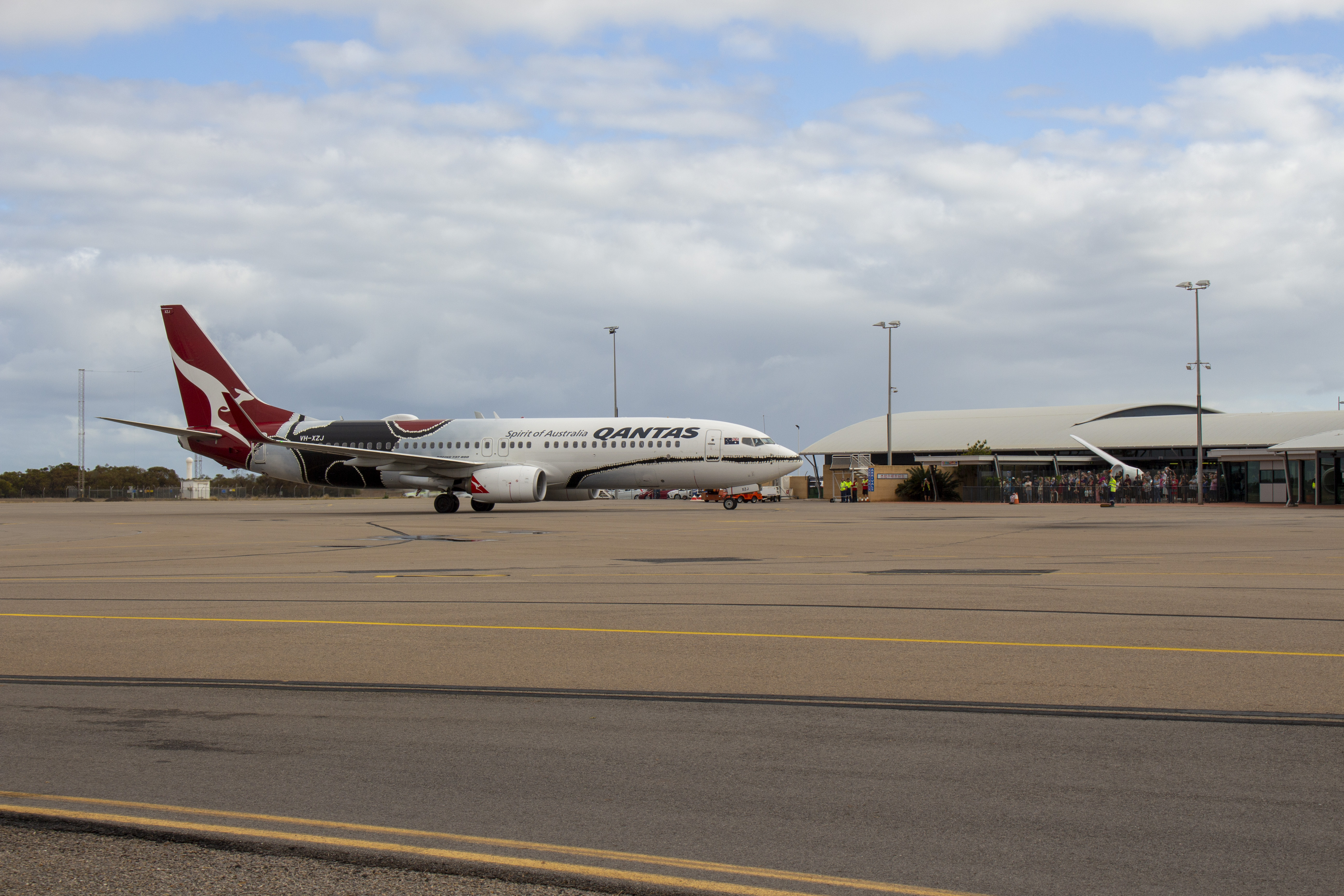
Qantas Boeing 737-800 at Geraldton Airport

Geraldton is close enough to Perth to receive a significant number of private operations from aircraft based in Perth. Geraldton is also a convenient location for pilots to fly to for recreational reasons.

=== Rescue and emergency services ===
The Royal Flying Doctor Service in Western Australia utilises the airport on an as-required basis and has an aircraft hangar which is vested in the City of Greater Geraldton adjacent to the general aviation terminal.

DFES and WA Police typically use Geraldton Airport as a base for their Perth-based aircraft when conducting missions and operations in the region.

The Moonyoonooka Volunteer Bush Fire Brigade and Geraldton-Greenough SES are located within the airport precinct, with the new SES building opening in 2019 as part of the 2018-2019 Airport Expansion Project.

=== Royal Australian Air Force ===
Flying training squadrons from RAAF Base Pearce also use Geraldton Airport. They pay regular visits with Pilatus PC-21 training aircraft, and occasional visits with Hawk 127 jets, often staying overnight conducting circuits and cross-country navigation exercises.

C130 Hercules transport aircraft also use Geraldton Airport for training on occasions throughout the year.

== History ==
=== 1921 Australia's first scheduled air mail service ===
Australia's first scheduled air mail service commenced on 5 December 1921 with a flight from Geraldton to Derby by West Australian Airways Ltd, flown by World War I veterans Maj. Norman Brearley DSO, MC, AFC and Lt. Len Taplin in a Bristol Tourer.

The airfield was originally located in what is now the Geraldton suburb of Utakarra before later moving to its current location in Moonyoonooka.

=== World War II ===
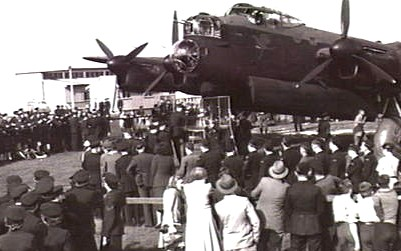
Service personnel and civilians queue up to inspect the Avro Lancaster bomber "Queenie VI", at No. 4 Service Flying Training School, RAAF at Geraldton Airport

From 1941 to 1945, Geraldton Airport (by now located in Moonyoonooka) was the site of No. 4 Service Flying Training School RAAF during World War II.

The training school was formed in February 1941 and commenced flying the following month, responsible for intermediate and advanced instruction of pilots under the Empire Air Training Scheme (EATS). The school operated Avro Anson aircraft and by November 1941, two Fairey Battles and two de Havilland Fox Moths also operated at No. 4 SFTS.

In August 1943, No. 4 SFTS had a visit from an Avro Lancaster, "Queenie VI".

Two reserve squadrons were formed in response to the outbreak of war in the Pacific, though they never saw action. Flying activity was reduced towards the end of 1943, and the school was disbanded in May 1945, having graduated over 1,000 pilots. It re-formed as No. 87 Operational Base Unit, which was renamed Care and Maintenance Unit (CMU) Geraldton in May 1946. CMU Geraldton was disbanded in September 1947.

=== 1945 Douglas DC-3 service commencement ===
In 1945, MacRobertson Miller Aviation Company (MMA) began Douglas DC-3 services to Geraldton with flight time of less than 2 hours to Perth. DC-3 services continued into the early 1960s.

=== 1960s Fokker F-27 Friendship service commencement, Qantas B707 alternative landing site ===
In December 1959, MMA commenced flying the Fokker F27 to Geraldton, increasing passenger seats to 40 and halving the flight time to Perth to about one hour. The first F27 flight by MMA to Geraldton was by Captain Syd Goddard, a graduate of the former No. 4 Service Flying School which was based at Geraldton during World War II.

In 1962, Geraldton Airport was approved as an alternative landing airport should Perth Airport be unavailable, for Qantas Boeing 707s, one of the largest commercial airliners at the time.

=== 1969 Duke and Duchess of Kent visit ===
On 28 August 1969, The Duke of Kent and Duchess of Kent visited Geraldton from Perth, flying on an RAAF BAC 1-11, marking the first landing at Geraldton by a large jet.

=== 1971 Fokker F28 jet service commencement ===
Commencing 4 October 1971, MMA began flying 60-seat Fokker F28 jet aircraft to Geraldton, reducing the flight time from an hour to 45 minutes.

=== 1974 Princess Anne visit ===
During the 1974 Royal Visit to Australia in which Queen Elizabeth II opened the Australian Parliament in Canberra and visited many towns across the country, Princess Anne stopped over in Geraldton.

=== 1979 Brearley Terminal opens ===
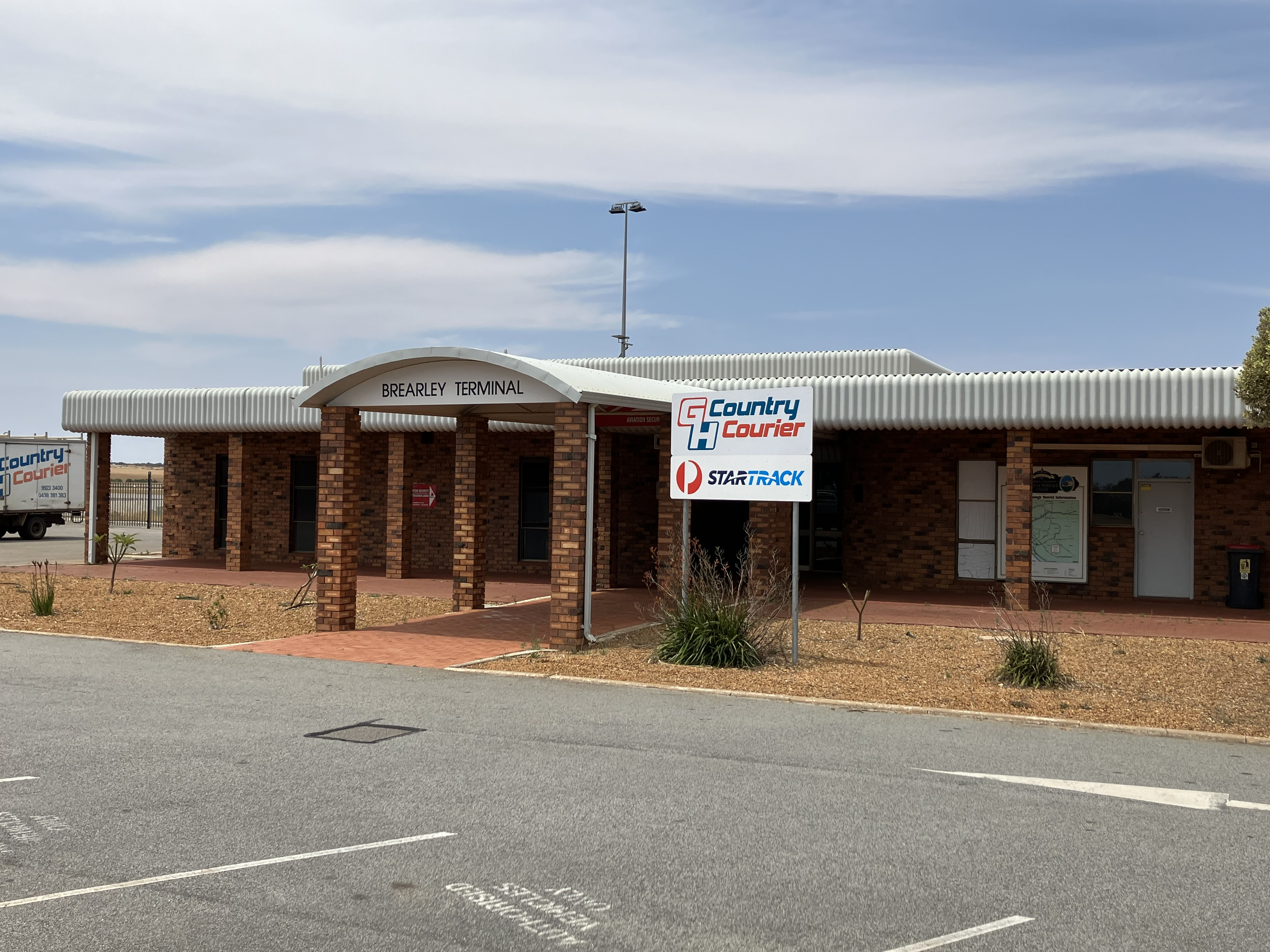
Geraldton Airport Brearley Terminal, October 2023

The new Brearley Terminal, named after Sir Norman Brearley opens.

=== 1985 BAE-146 service commencement ===
In 1985, MMA (now known as Airlines of Western Australia, a subsidiary of Ansett) introduced 75-seat BAE-146 aircraft to the Geraldton-Perth route, complementing the existing F-28 services.

=== 1988 Queen Elizabeth II and the Duke of Edinburgh visit ===
On 22 April 1988, Her Majesty Queen Elizabeth II and the Duke of Edinburgh visited Geraldton to proclaim Geraldton a City (formerly the Town of Geraldton).

They arrived at Geraldton Airport on an RAAF BAC 1-11, registration VH-FKG, captained by RAAF Wing Commander Michael Birks, a former Geraldton student.

=== 1991 Shire of Greenough ownership and Fokker F50s ===
In 1991, the airport became owned by the Shire of Greenough, the neighbouring Shire to the City of Geraldton and the LGA responsible for Moonyoonooka.

The City of Geraldton and the Shire of Greenough would later amalgamate to become the City of Geraldton-Greenough in 2007, before amalgamating again with the Shire of Mullewa in 2011 to become the City of Greater Geraldton, the current owner and operator of Geraldton Airport.

Skywest Airlines (a subsidiary of Ansett Airlines) began flying Fokker F50 aircraft to Geraldton in the 90s and would continue to do so until February 2016.

=== 2001 New $3.6m Greenough terminal opens ===
On 13 August 2001, WA Premier Geoff Gallop opened a brand new $3.6 million airport terminal at Geraldton Airport, known as the Greenough Terminal. Greenough Terminal replaced the Brearley Terminal as the main terminal for RPT flights.

=== 2004 Fokker F100 (Skywest) service commencement ===
In June 2004, Skywest Airlines introduced Fokker F100 100-seat aircraft onto the Geraldton-Perth route to complement their existing F50 services.

=== 2011 Qantas commencement ===
Qantas conducted its inaugural QantasLink flight to Geraldton on B717 aircraft VH-NXQ, captained by Andrew Hardey on 11 January 2011. Several high-profile passengers were on this flight including Western Australian state treasurer Troy Buswell and Geoffrey Thomas.

Regular Public Transport (RPT) QantasLink services commenced on 21 November 2011 with Dash 8-Q400 aircraft operated by Sunstate Airlines.

=== 2014 Qantas Fokker F100 services commence ===
In July 2014, Qantas commenced QantasLink Fokker 100 jet services on the Geraldton-Perth route, operated by Network Aviation which replaced the Dash 8s on the route.

=== 2016 Final Virgin Australia Fokker F50 RPT flight ===
On 27 February 2016, the final Fokker F50 RPT flight flown by Virgin Australia Regional Airlines was VA2654 from Geraldton to Perth on aircraft VH-FNF which was still in the Skywest livery and was piloted by Captain Douglas Parry and First Officer Tori Perrow.

From this point all flights from both Qantas and Virgin were now exclusively operated on Fokker 100 jets.

=== 2018 Qantas B737-800 "Mendoowoorrji" ===
On 27 May 2018, the biggest chartered flight to Geraldton operated by a Qantas Boeing 737-800 landed at Geraldton Airport.

The flight was chartered by Scott Cogar, the Broadwater Hotels and Resorts managing director and Tourism Geraldton chairman, to coincide with the Growing Greater Geraldton Tourism Investment Summit to promote support for larger and more modern air services and tourism to Geraldton.

=== 2018-2019 Airport expansion ===
In 2019, the City of Greater Geraldton completed a $24 million project to expand the capacity of Geraldton Airport, with works that commenced in November 2018.

The expansion project included the renewal and upgrade of the existing runway, taxiway and apron pavements as well as extension of the main runway to 2,389 metres and expansion of the main apron to accommodate larger aircraft such as the A330 and B787. Geraldton Airport will also have greater capacity as an alternative landing port for Perth Airport in the case of fog or bad weather.

The city also stated that the expansion will enable development of direct interstate and international services for tourism and airfreight, and should give the private sector greater confidence to invest in Geraldton.

The expansion of Geraldton Airport commenced November 2018 and was completed in June 2019, with WBHO Infrastructure being awarded the construction contract.

Funding for the project consisted of:

- $7.5 million contributed by the City of Greater Geraldton
- $6.5 million contributed by the Western Australian State Government
- $10 million contributed by the Australian Government through the Building Better Regions Fund

The airport runway extensions were officially opened on Friday 6 September 2019 by Federal Member for Durack the Hon. Melissa Price MP, City of Greater Geraldton Mayor Shane van Styn and Member for the Agricultural Region Hon. Laurie Graham MLC.

=== 2019 Virgin Australia RPT service cessation ===
In May 2019, Virgin Australia Regional Airlines announced it would cease operating their Perth to Geraldton RPT route from 21 July 2019, leaving QantasLink as the sole major airline servicing Geraldton. Virgin Australia cited declining customer numbers as the reason for the decision.

Bureau of Infrastructure & Transport Research Economics statistics show that in the six months prior to July 2019 (January–June), Virgin Australia's average on-time performance for both arrivals and departures was only 75%, compared to Qantas' performance of 85.2% for arrivals and 90.7% for departures on the same route.

As of April 2023 Virgin Australia still provides regular charter flights between Geraldton and locations including Boolgeeda, Perth and Busselton.

=== 2021 Airbus A320 service commencement ===
In August 2021, Qantas began upgrading some of their Fokker 100 RPT services to 180-seat Airbus A320s. Many of these A320s were ex-Jetstar aircraft. Qantas plans to replace their Fokker 100 and Boeing 717 fleets with the A320 and A220 on their respective routes.

=== 2022 Geraldton-Karratha direct flight announcement ===
In May 2022, the Western Australian Government announced funding in the 2022-23 State Budget to expand the Inter-Regional Flight Network (IRFN), with a new direct flight between Geraldton and Karratha, operated by Aviair and commencing in July 2022.

Aviair planned to introduce Dash-8 Q400 aircraft to their fleet to support the new route and overall Inter-Regional Flight Network.

In May 2023, Aviair and the WA Government announced the service would finally commence in July 2023 through Aviair's new subsidiary, Nexus Airlines.

=== 2023 Boeing 737-700 ===
Virgin Australia announced in April 2022 plans to retire their Fokker 100 fleet and replace them with Boeing 737-700s.

In April 2023, Virgin Australia began using Boeing 737-700 aircraft on some charter flights to and from Geraldton to Boolgeeda and Perth.

=== 2023 Nexus Airlines ===
On 17 May 2023, the WA Government and Aviair announced the launch of a new airline, Nexus Airlines, a subsidiary of Aviair, to operate the new and previously announced Geraldton-Karratha Inter-Regional Flight Network (IRFN) route, as well as launch a new service on the Geraldton-Perth route.

Nexus Airlines operate a fleet of five 76-seat Dash-8 Q400 aircraft on the routes, and commenced services on 10 July 2023.

== Airport Renewable Energy Microgrid Power Project ==
In June 2023 the City of Greater Geraldton announced they were successful in obtaining more than $2 million in funding from the Australian Government's Disaster Ready Fund to build a renewal energy microgrid.

With an additional $2.2 million from the City of Greater Geraldton, the $4.2 million project will make the Geraldton Airport precinct the first in the nation to have its own source of renewable energy.

The microgrid construction is planned to be built to be cyclone rated in the wake of Cyclone Seroja which caused major damage in the region in April 2021, and is expected to support the Department of Fire and Emergency Services and associated emergency services based in the Geraldton Airport precinct during emergencies, and in particular, when battling increasingly major bushfires in the region during Summer.

== Statistics ==
Geraldton Airport was ranked 44th in Australia for the number of revenue passengers served in financial year 2021–2022.

Annual passenger and aircraft statistics for Geraldton Airport
Year	Revenue passengers	Aircraft movements
2001-02	48,774	2,421
2002-03	54,880	2,552
2003-04	56,707	2,416
2004-05	77,235	3,727
2005-06	88,610	3,676
2006-07	87,634	3,473
2007-08	103,455	4,273
2008-09	99,479	4,068
2009-10	99,364	4,198
2010-11	104,051	3,783
2011-12	126,818	3,779
2012-13	130,530	3,647
2013-14	129,980	3,844
2014-15	120,442	3,466
2015-16	116,852	2,891
2016-17	115,701	2,409
2017-18	111,947	2,269
2018-19	110,317	2,022
2019-20	77,317	1,248
2020-21	52,591	883
2021-22	80,374	1,238

== See also ==
- List of airports in Western Australia
- Aviation transport in Australia
