= No. 68 Squadron RAAF =

No. 68 Squadron RAAF may refer to one of two Australian military units:

- No. 2 Squadron RAAF, which was designated No. 68 Squadron of the Royal Flying Corps during part of World War I
- No. 68 (Reserve) Squadron RAAF, a reserve squadron formed as part of No. 4 Service Flying Training School RAAF during World War II
