= Boolgeeda Airport =

Airport in Western Australia

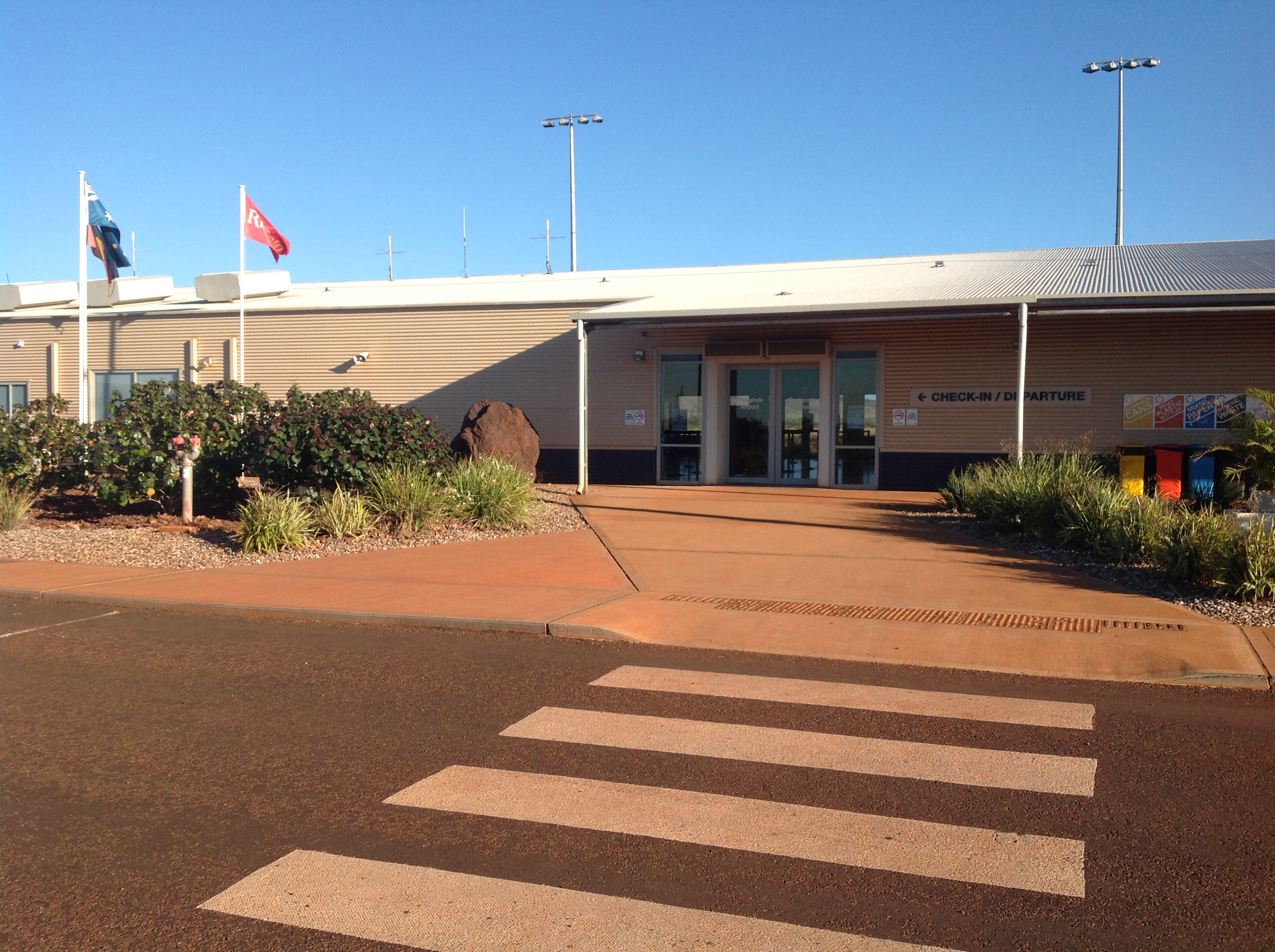
- Boolgeeda Airport front entry
- IATA: OCM; ICAO: YBGD

Summary
- Airport type: Private
- Owner: Pilbara Iron
- Operator: Aerodrome Management Services
- Location: Brockman 4 mine
- Elevation AMSL: 1,871 ft (570 m)
- Coordinates: 22°32′23″S 117°16′31″E

Map
- Location of the airport in Western Australia

Runways
Direction	Length		Surface
Direction	m	ft	Surface
08/26	1,682	5,518	Asphalt
- Sources: Australian Aeronautical Information Publication

Boolgeeda Airport (IATA: OCM, ICAO: YBGD) is an airport serving the Brockman 4 mine in the Pilbara region of Western Australia.

In 2012, the gravel runway was sealed and lengthened to 2.2 kilometres to allow Airbus A320, Fokker 100 and Boeing 737s to use it. The airport reopened on 27 November 2012 with a regional flight from Busselton while direct flights from Perth commenced on 3 December.

== Airlines and destinations ==
Airlines	Destinations
QantasLink	Charter: Perth
Virgin Australia Regional Airlines	Charter: Albany, Brisbane, Busselton, Geraldton, Perth, West Angelas
