= Karratha Airport =

Airport in Western Australia

- IATA: KTA; ICAO: YPKA

Summary
- Airport type: Public
- Operator: City of Karratha
- Location: Karratha, Western Australia
- Elevation AMSL: 32 ft / 10 m
- Coordinates: 20°42′44″S 116°46′24″E
- Website: www.karrathaairport.com.au

Map

Runways
Direction	Length		Surface
Direction	m	ft	Surface
08/26	2,280	7,480	Asphalt

Statistics (2016/17)
- Passenger movements: ▼463,966
- Aircraft movements: ▼6,679
- Sources: Australian AIP and aerodrome chart passenger and aircraft movements from Bureau of Infrastructure & Transport Research Economics

Karratha Airport (IATA: KTA, ICAO: YPKA) is an airport in Karratha, in the Pilbara region of Western Australia. The airport is 14 km (8.7 mi) from Karratha and 5 nautical miles (9.3 km; 5.8 mi) south of Dampier.

== History ==
At the beginning of the iron ore industry in the early 1960s, Dampier was chosen as the port for Hamersley Iron's operations and this signalled the beginning of major development in the Pilbara. Roebourne airport was the nearest airport. In 1966 Hamersley Iron constructed an airport on the present Karratha Airport site with a sealed gravel runway and small terminal building and named it Dampier Airport. With the introduction of the Fokker F28 jet aircraft by MacRobertson Miller Airlines (MMA) in 1969, regular passenger flights by MMA to the unsealed Roebourne airport were discontinued.

After several years as a private airport, the airport was taken over by the Shire of Roebourne. Several upgrades have been made over the decades, including a new runway and new terminals. The old runway is now used as a taxiway and helicopter landing site for the many helicopters servicing the facilities in the North West Shelf gas field and marine pilot transfers for iron ore and gas ships using the nearby ports of Dampier and Walcott. The runway is capable of handling aircraft up to Boeing 737-800 size routinely, but can handle up to a Boeing 767-300, Boeing C-17 Globemaster III or even Antonov An-124 Ruslan.

From the 1960s to the 1980s, MMA was the largest operator serving Karratha. East-West Airlines introduced services in the 1980s to compete with the Ansett until it was taken over by Ansett. Aircraft that operated into Karratha over the decades include the Fokker F27, Fokker F28, British Aerospace 146, Fokker 100, Boeing 717, Embraer E-Jets (170 and 190) and the Boeing 737. Bristow Helicopters, CHC Helicopter and Helicopters (NZ) also have bases in Karratha operating helicopters such as the Agusta 109, Agusta 139, Sikorsky S-76, Aerospatiale Super Puma and Airbus Helicopters EC225.

Karratha Airport is the second busiest airport in Western Australia that handles commercial flights, with Perth Airport being the busiest, and has played a major role in the development of the Pilbara region. In the year ending 30 June 2009 the airport handled 486,582 passengers, an increase of almost 100,000 since 2008, and was ranked 18th busiest in Australia. For the year ending June 2010 this had increased to 587,211 passengers, and by 2011 it had reached 675,207 passengers. Of these passengers, the vast majority are fly-in fly-out workers. The airport is now the 17th busiest.

Karratha Airport underwent a major revamp following a council decision to redevelop the terminal. The $35 million upgrade provides several major changes within the terminal and includes a new cafe, bar, combined arrivals and departure area, new toilet facilities, improved security screening and baggage reclaim. The terminal was officially opened by Deputy Prime Minister Warren Truss on 25 September 2015.

Qantas began operating services from Brisbane in November 2007, followed by Melbourne and Sydney in May and June 2010. All were withdrawn in 2014 amid a downturn in the mining industry. Flights between Karratha and Brisbane were set to resume in 2018, but after would-be operator JetGo was placed into liquidation, the service was cancelled.

== Airlines and destinations ==
Airlines	Destinations
Alliance Airlines	Charter: Perth
Nexus Airlines	Broome, Geraldton, Port Hedland
Qantas	Perth
QantasLink	Perth
Virgin Australia	Perth
Virgin Australia Regional Airlines	Perth

== Operations ==
Busiest domestic routes into and out of Karratha Airport (FY 2011)
Rank	Airport	Passengers carried	% change
1	Western Australia, Perth Airport	615,689	▲9.0
