= Nexus Airlines =

Airline in Western Australia

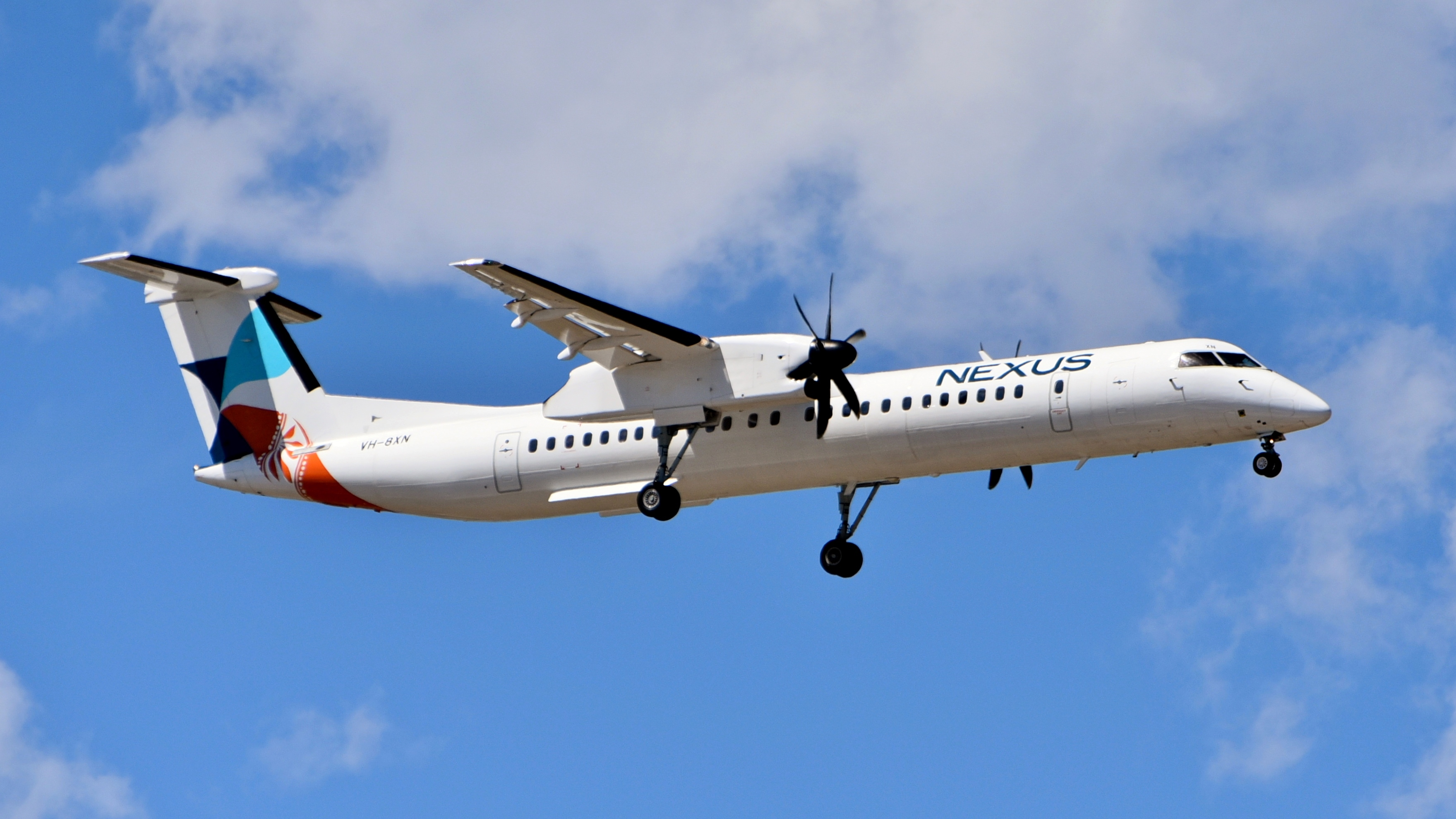
- Nexus Airlines De Havilland Canada Dash 8-Q400
IATA	ICAO	Call sign
GD	—	CONNECT
- Founded: 17 May 2023; 3 years ago
- Commenced operations: 10 July 2023; 3 years ago
- Operating bases: Broome; Geraldton
- Frequent-flyer program: NexusGO
- Alliance: Aviair
- Fleet size: 5
- Destinations: 8
- Parent company: HM Consolidated Group
- Headquarters: Kununurra, Western Australia
- Key people: Michael McConachy (Managing Director)
- Website: nexusairlines.com.au

Nexus Airlines is an Australian regional airline based in Kununurra, Western Australia. A subsidiary of the HMC Group, it commenced operations in July 2023 and operates in Western Australia and formerly the Northern Territory.

== History ==
Nexus Airlines launched on 17 May 2023 announcing plans to commence regular public transport (RPT) services with five De Havilland Canada Dash 8-Q400 turboprop aircraft leased from Nordic Aviation Capital.

The first flight on the Geraldton to Broome via Karratha and Port Hedland route commenced on 10 July 2023. The airline has exclusive rights to operate the route until June 2027.

On 28 July 2023, a Northern Route between Broome and Darwin via Kununurra was established, in competition with incumbent operator Airnorth. Initially four flights a week were operated on this route, in May 2024 this increased to daily. The route was discontinued in August 2025 after it became "financially unsustainable".

On 2 April 2024 Nexus commenced RPT flights between Perth and Kalgoorlie twice daily one day per week.

== Destinations ==
Nexus Airlines operates flights from Perth to Geraldton and Kalgoorlie. Flights to and from Perth operate out of Perth Airport's regional Terminal 2.

On the Inter Regional Flight Network, Nexus operate between Geraldton and Broome, via Karratha and Port Hedland.

== Fleet ==
Aircraft	In service	Orders	Passengers	Notes
De Havilland Canada Dash 8-400	5	10	76	

== Parent company ==
The parent company, HM Consolidated Pty Ltd, owns aviation and tourism businesses across the Pilbara and Kimberley regions. HMC Group began operations in 2014. In 2022, it received $15 million of government funds through the Australian Business Growth Fund after a referral from the Commonwealth Bank.

In 2026, its aviation subsidiaries were the Australian Helicopter Academy, Aviair, HeliSpirit and Nexus Airlines. Tourism subsidiaries included Bungle Bungle Guided Tours, Bungle Bungle Savannah Lodge, Freshwater East Kimberley Apartments, Kimberley Experiences and The PumpHouse Kununurra restaurant.
