= Norman Brearley =

Australian pioneer aviator

Sir Norman Brearley
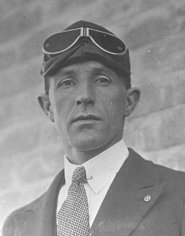
- Norman Brearley in the 1920s
- Born: 22 December 1890; Geelong, Victoria, Australia
- Died: 9 June 1989 (aged 98)
- Occupation: Pilot
- Title: Sir

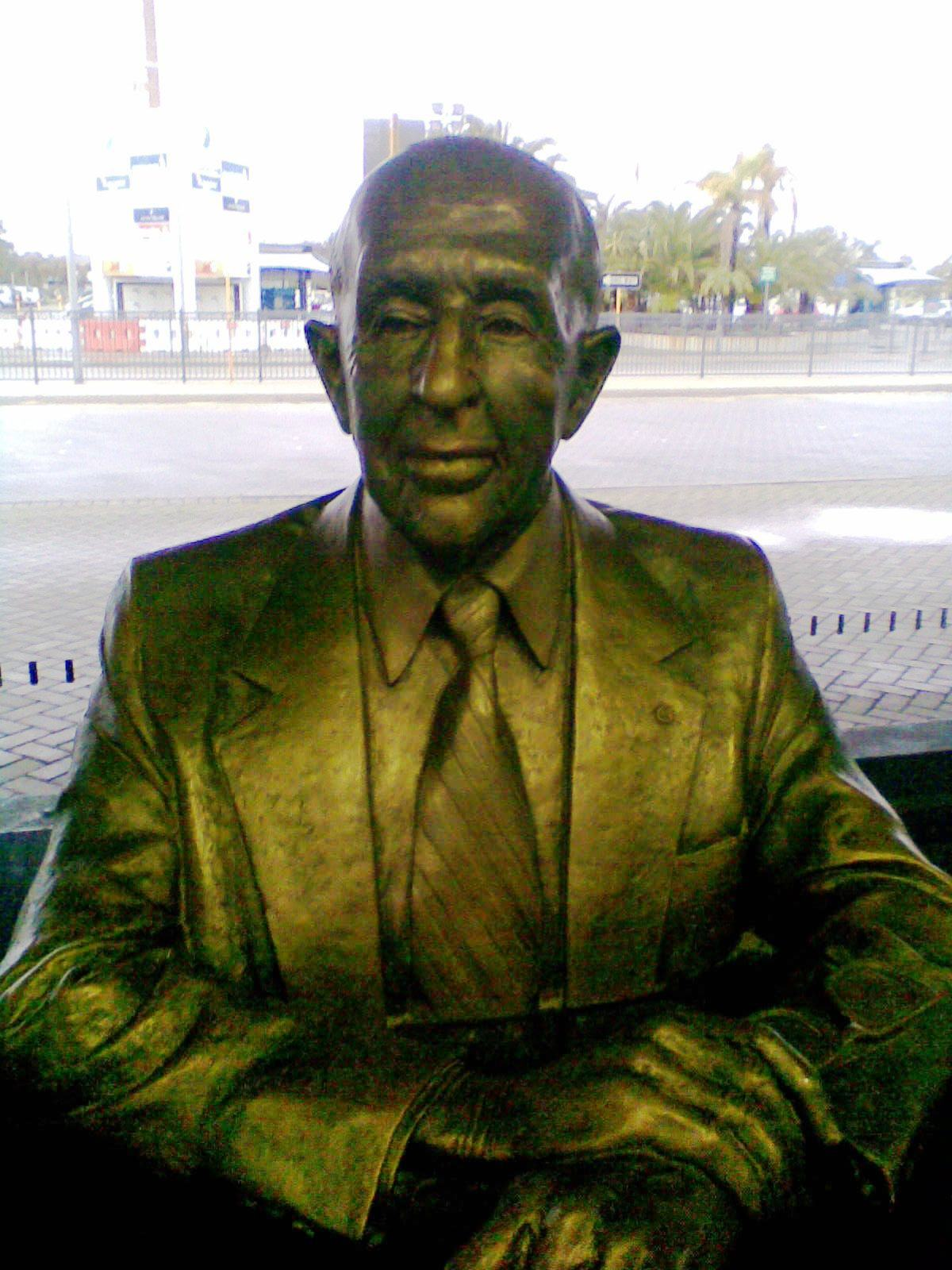
Bust of Brearley at Perth Airport by sculptor Gerard Darwin

Sir Norman Brearley CBE, DSO, MC, AFC, FRAeS (22 December 1890 – 9 June 1989) was a commercial and military pilot and one of the pioneers of the airline industry within Australia.

== Early life ==
Born in Geelong, Victoria on 22 December 1890, Brearley moved to Perth, Western Australia in 1906.

== Aviation career ==
=== First World War ===
In April 1915, after undertaking a 5-year apprenticeship as a mechanic, Brearley worked his way to the United Kingdom and subsequently enlisted in the Royal Flying Corps and trained as a pilot. On the Western Front, he was posted initially to No. 6 Squadron, but transferred to No. 29 Squadron, where he flew Airco DH.2 scouts (including patrols flown alongside Sergeant James McCudden). However, in November 1916 he was shot down and badly wounded, with bullets perforating both lungs: he landed in no man's land, but managed to crawl back to Allied lines. He returned to Western Australia to recover. He subsequently returned to Britain where he became a flying instructor, initially at Gosport and then as commander of the school of special flying at Lilbourne.

=== Post-war ===
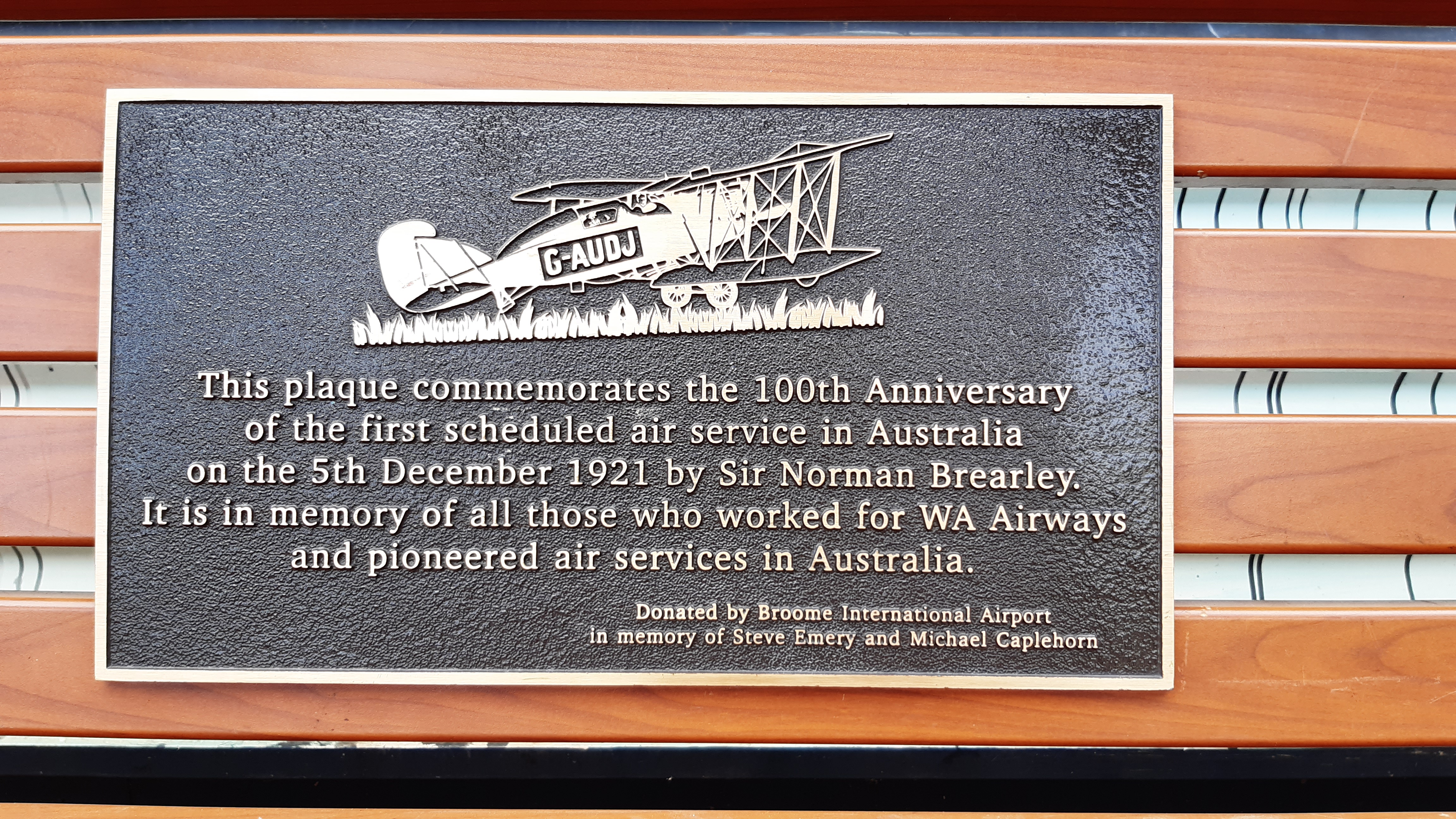
A plaque in recognition of Brearley at Broome International Airport

Following the end of hostilities, Brearley bought two Avro 504 aircraft (plus a spare engine), which he had shipped to Australia. In 1921, he founded Western Australian Airways Ltd., based at Geraldton. In the same year, he was issued with Australia's first civil pilot's licence, under the 1921 Air Navigation Regulations. His licence was numbered as licence No. 2, but there was no licence No. 1 at the time: a licence of that number was not issued until 1930, when it was presented to Amy Johnson in honour of her record flight from London to Australia.

In 1927, Brearley opened the Perth Flying School at Maylands. He retired from commercial aviation in 1936 when he merged his airline with Australian National Airways.

== Later life ==
Brearley later served with the Royal Australian Air Force during World War II, commanding No. 4 Service Flying Training School at Geraldton from October 1942 to March 1944.

Brearley was knighted in 1971. He died on 9 June 1989.

== Personal life ==
Brearley married Violet Claremont Stubbs, the daughter of Sydney Stubbs, at Christ Church, Claremont on 5 July 1917, when he was recovering from his injuries. She died in 1982, aged 85. The couple had a son and a daughter.
