= Esperance Airport =

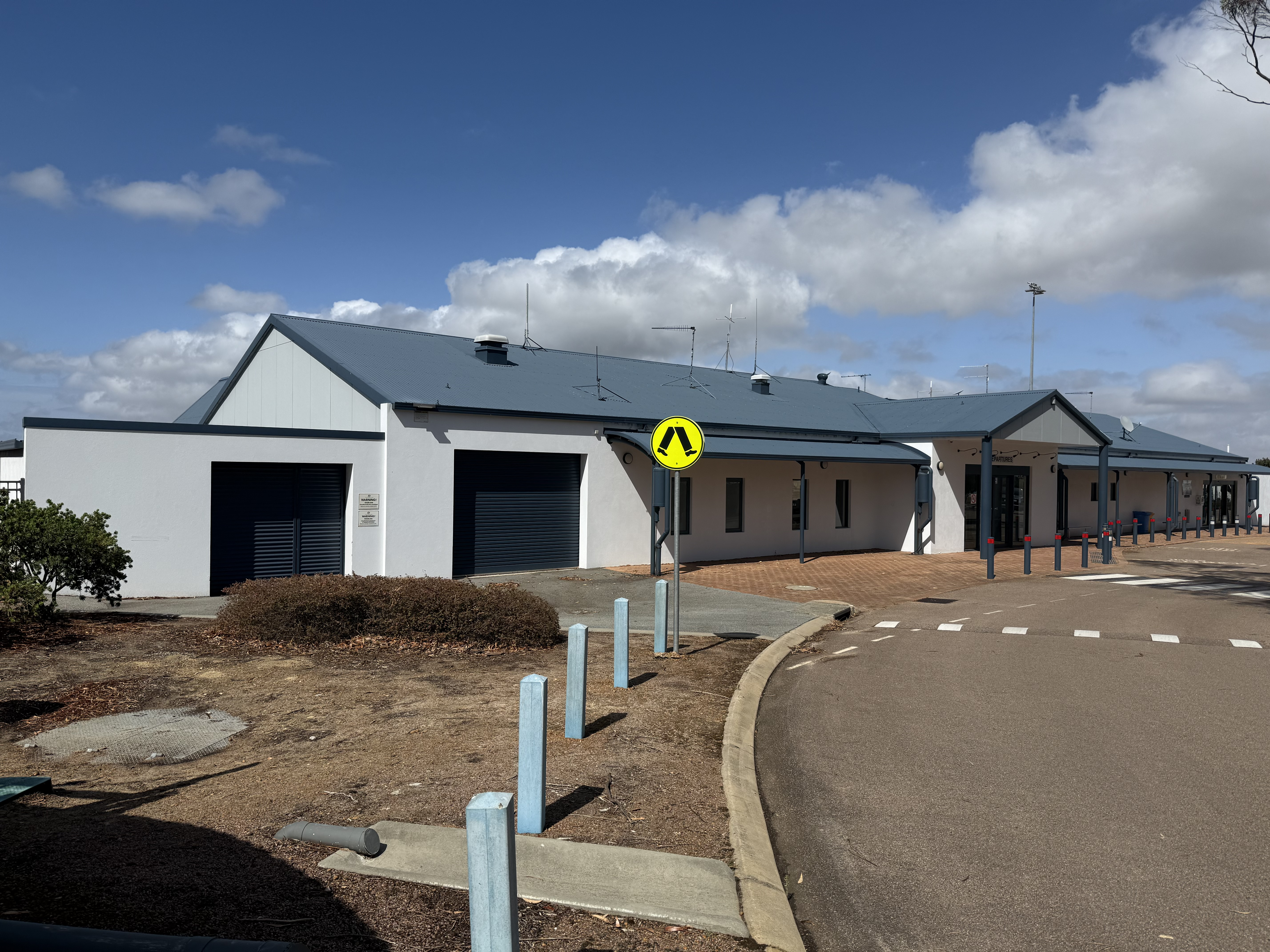
- The airport terminal, 2025
- IATA: EPR; ICAO: YESP

Summary
- Airport type: Public
- Operator: Esperance Shire Council
- Serves: Esperance, Western Australia
- Location: Gibson, Western Australia
- Elevation AMSL: 470 ft (140 m)
- Coordinates: 33°40′59″S 121°49′30″E

Map
- Location in Western Australia

Runways
Direction	Length		Surface
Direction	m	ft	Surface
11/29	1,800	5,906	Asphalt
03/21	1,178	3,865	Gravel
- Sources: Australian AIP and aerodrome chart

Esperance Airport (IATA: EPR, ICAO: YESP) is an airport in Esperance, Western Australia. The airport is 12 nautical miles (22 km; 14 mi) northwest of the city, near the locality of Gibson.

== Airlines and destinations ==
Airlines	Destinations
Rex Airlines	Perth

Qantas and Virgin Australia Regional Airlines previously operated flights from Esperance to Perth.

== Incidents ==
- On 13 May 1980, a Skywest Swearingen Metro II experienced a failure of its right engine at low altitude whilst approaching Esperance Airport during a scheduled passenger flight, forcing the pilot to execute an emergency landing in a nearby field. The single crewmember and all eleven passengers on board evacuated the aircraft before it was destroyed in a fire.

== See also ==
- List of airports in Western Australia
- Transport in Australia § Aviation
