= Fitzroy Crossing Airport =

- IATA: FIZ; ICAO: YFTZ

Summary
- Airport type: Public
- Operator: Shire of Derby/West Kimberley
- Location: Fitzroy Crossing, Western Australia
- Elevation AMSL: 368 ft / 112 m
- Coordinates: 18°10′51″S 125°33′39″E

Map
- Location in Western Australia

Runways
Direction	Length		Surface
Direction	m	ft	Surface
01/19	1,300	4,265	Asphalt
- Sources: Australian AIP and aerodrome chart

Fitzroy Crossing Airport (IATA: FIZ, ICAO: YFTZ) is located 2 nautical miles (3.7 km; 2.3 mi) northwest of Fitzroy Crossing, Western Australia.

The Airport has basic amenities including an undercover waiting area, water fountain and toilet facility for passengers. The airport has a number of private hangars and helipads for light aircraft and small regional airlines. There is a regular passenger service operated by Skippers Aviation between Halls Creek and Broome that picks passengers up in Fitzroy Crossing.

Fitzroy Crossing Airport is often the only form of transportation between the township of Fitzroy Crossing and the outside world through the wet season.

== Airlines and destinations ==
Airlines	Destinations
Skippers Aviation	Broome, Halls Creek

== See also ==
- List of airports in Western Australia
- Transport in Australia § Aviation
