= Kalbarri Airport =

Airport in Western Australia

- IATA: KAX; ICAO: YKBR

Summary
- Airport type: Public
- Owner: Shire of Northampton
- Operator: Shire of Northampton
- Location: Kalbarri, Western Australia, Australia
- Elevation AMSL: 515 ft / 157 m
- Coordinates: 27°41′30″S 114°15′36″E

Map
- Location in Western Australia

Runways
Direction	Length		Surface
Direction	m	ft	Surface
18/36	1,600	5,249	Asphalt
- Sources: AIP

Kalbarri Airport (IATA: KAX, ICAO: YKBR) in Kalbarri, Western Australia is owned and operated by the Shire of Northampton. The airport is approximately 10 km (6.2 mi) from the town centre.

Kalbarri Airport was opened on 22 September 2001 by the Hon. Michelle Roberts, and at the time was jointly owned by the Shire of Northampton and the former Shire of Greenough.

Total construction cost for the airport was $1.7 million, which was jointly funded by the WA Government's Regional Airports Development Scheme, the Shire of Northampton, the Shire of Greenough and the private sector.

The airport required assessment of environmental impact prior to construction.

== Airlines and destinations ==
Kalbarri Airport does not receive any regular passenger transport (RPT) flights, but receives visits from general aviation and charter light aircraft.

The airport was formerly serviced by Skywest Airlines with Fokker F50 aircraft.

== See also ==
- List of airports in Western Australia
- Aviation transport in Australia
