= Halls Creek Airport =

- IATA: HCQ; ICAO: YHLC

Summary
- Airport type: Public
- Owner: Shire of Halls Creek
- Operator: Aerodrome Management Services
- Location: Halls Creek, Western Australia
- Elevation AMSL: 1,346 ft / 410 m
- Coordinates: 18°13′59″S 127°40′08″E

Map
- Location in Western Australia

Runways
Direction	Length		Surface
Direction	m	ft	Surface
04/22	1,475	4,839	Asphalt
08/26	946	3,104	Gravel
- Sources: Australian AIP and aerodrome chart

Halls Creek Airport (IATA: HCQ, ICAO: YHLC) is a regional airport in Western Australia's Kimberley region. It is located in Halls Creek, which is approximately 2,524 km (1,568 mi) from Perth, Western Australia.

== Airlines and destinations ==
Airlines	Destinations
Aviair	Balgo, Kununurra
Skippers Aviation	Broome, Fitzroy Crossing

== History ==
Built in 1948, at the site of the new town of Halls Creek, which wasn't actually relocated to from the old down until the 1950s.

It began with 3 unsealed gravel runways, with the third closing in the 1980s or 1990s.

In 1997 the main runway 04/22 was sealed.

The second runway, 08/26 remains unsealed to this day.

During the 1970s a radio tower was present north of the airport beside the fuel facility. This was later removed and an NDB (Non-Directiona Beacon) was built to the northwest of the airport.

In 2010, a new NDB was built to the east of the main runway 04/22 which is still there today.

In 2015 a weather station was built at the airport, operated by the BOM (Bureau of Meteorology) as well as a wind profiler to the north of the unsealed runway.

== See also ==
- List of airports in Western Australia
- Transport in Australia § Aviation
