= Virgin Australia Regional Airlines =

Regional airline of Australia

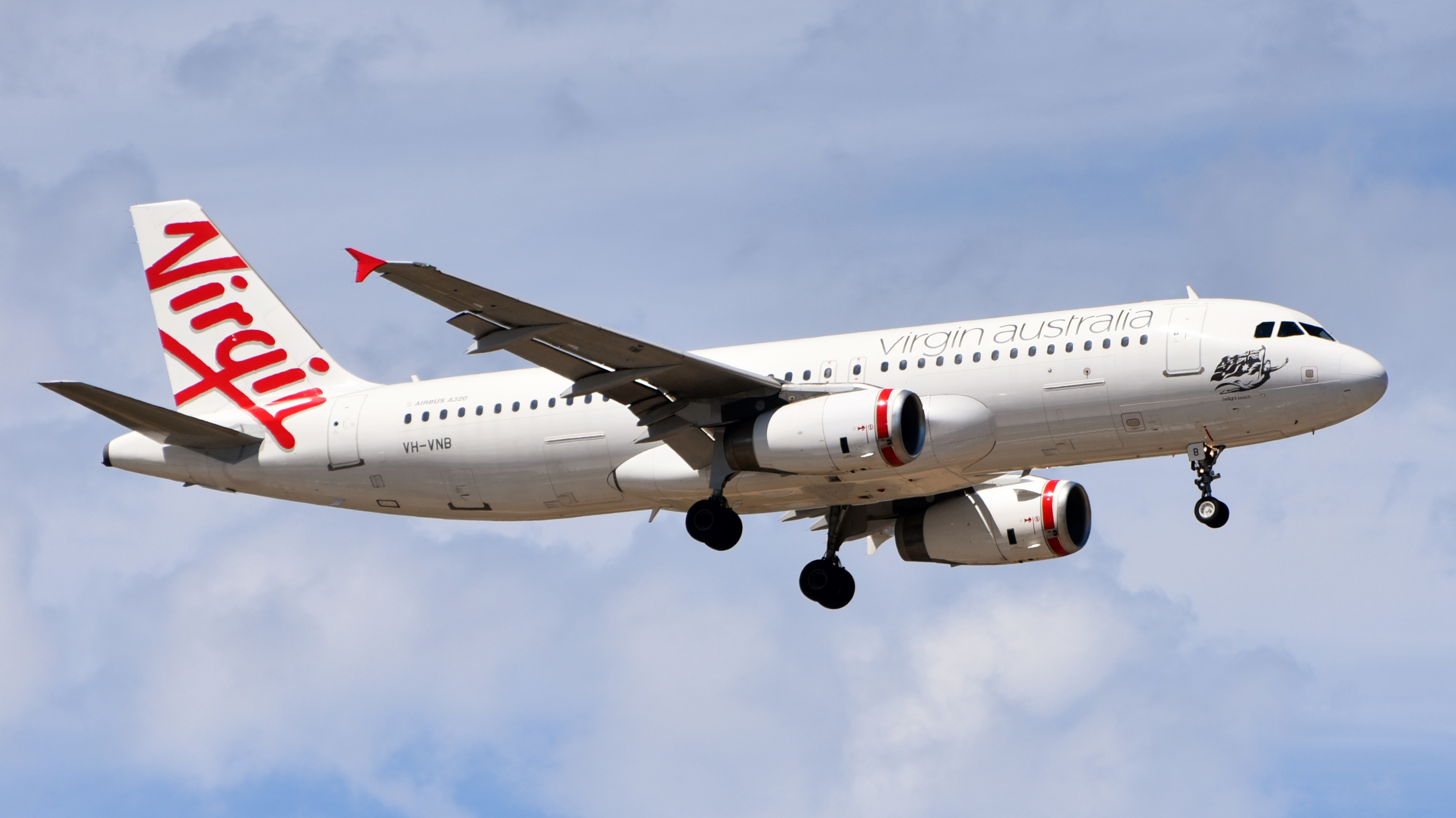
- Virgin Australia Regional Airbus A320
IATA	ICAO	Call sign
VA	VOZ	VELOCITY
- Founded: 1963 (as Carnarvon Air Taxis)
- Hubs: Perth Airport
- Frequent-flyer program: Velocity
- Fleet size: 6
- Destinations: 14
- Parent company: Virgin Australia Holdings
- Headquarters: Perth, Western Australia, Australia
- Key people: Nick Rohrlach (Group Executive)
- Employees: 450
- Website: www.virginaustralia.com

Virgin Australia Regional Airlines (VARA) is an Australian regional airline based in Perth, servicing key towns in the state of Western Australia as well as interstate destinations such as Adelaide and Darwin. Formerly known as Skywest, in April 2013, the airline was purchased by Virgin Australia Holdings as its new regional offshoot.

== History ==
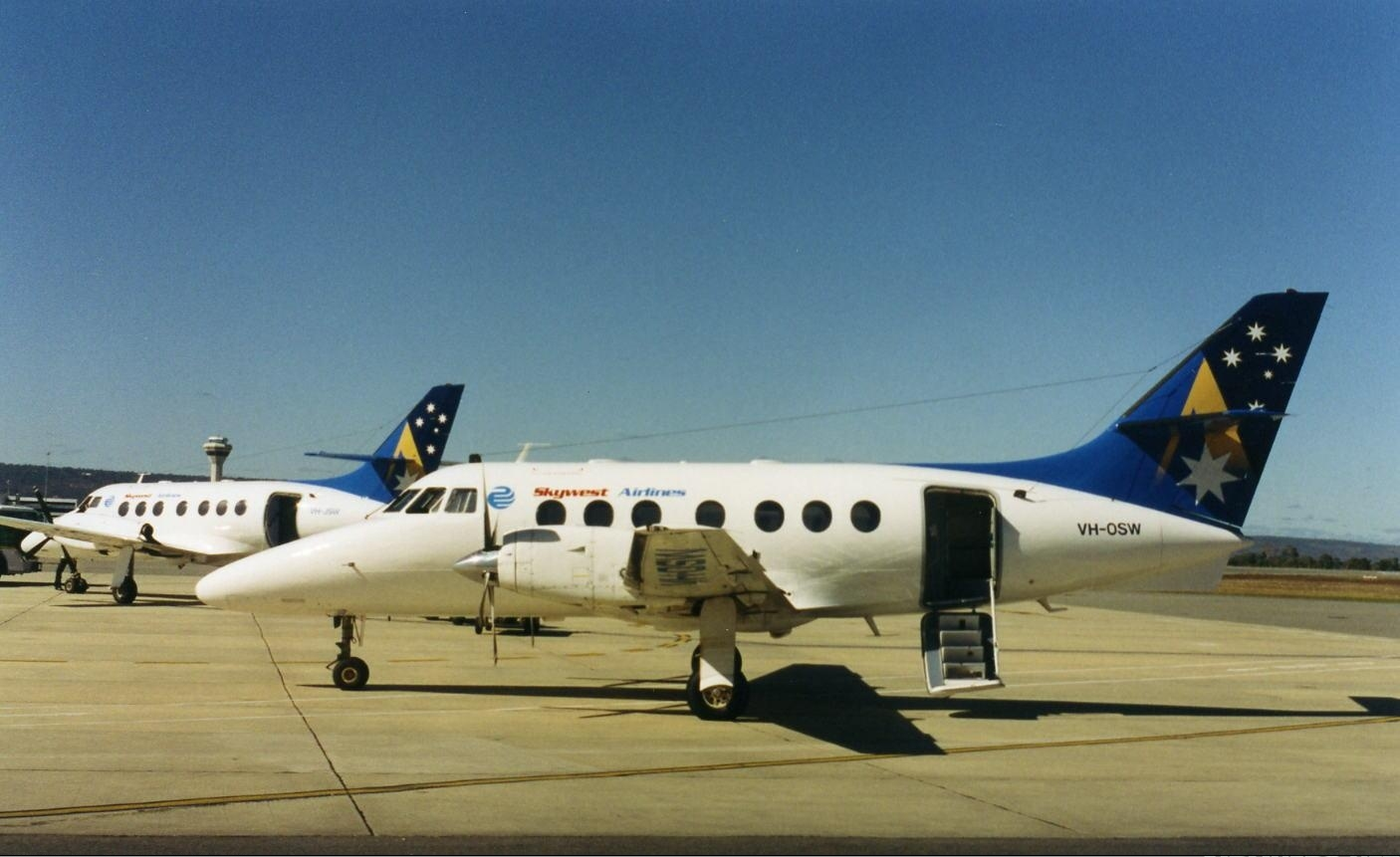
Two Skywest British Aerospace Jetstream 31s at Perth Airport in the mid 1990s

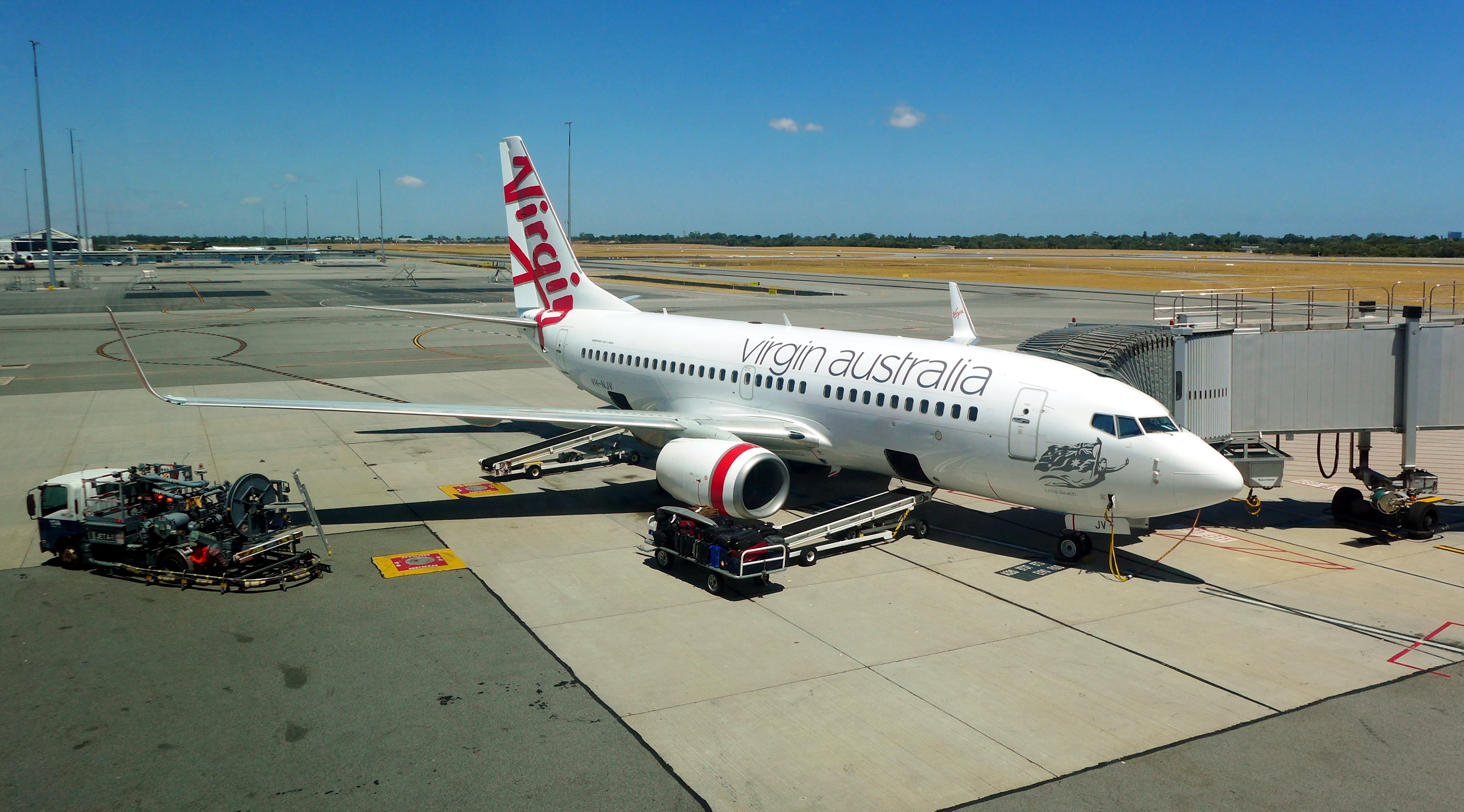
Virgin Australia Boeing 737-700 operated for Virgin Australia Regional Airlines

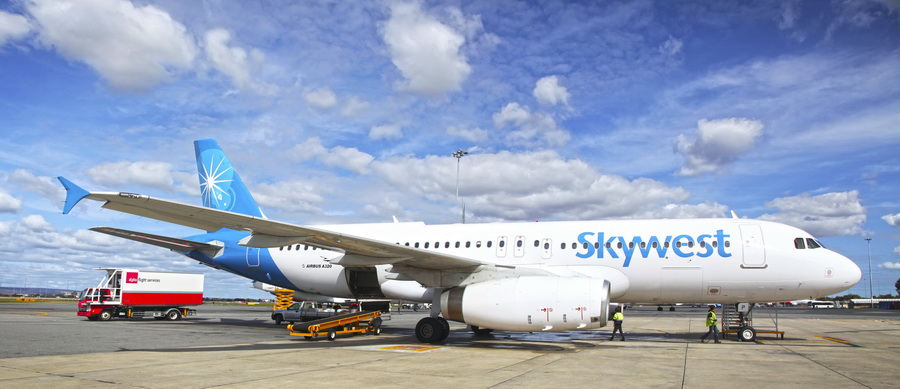
Skywest Airbus A320-200 at Perth Airport in 2011

=== Early years ===
Virgin Australia Regional was formed in 1963 as Carnarvon Air Taxis flying charter flights with small general aviation aircraft out of Carnarvon, Western Australia. In 1979, it changed its name to Skywest Aviation and moved to Perth's Jandakot Airport. In 1980, Skywest Airlines was formed (ICAO code OZW), based at Perth Airport, and acquired Stillwell Airlines and its routes; the combined fleet included 39 aircraft, making it the second largest commuter airline in Australia at the time. The Skywest Airlines fleet included a mix of general aviation types and small airliners including GAF N-24 Nomads, Embraer EMB 110 Bandeirantes, Beechcraft King Air 200s and Fairchild SA-227 Metro IIIs, as well as smaller types such as Cessna 182 Skylanes and Piper Aztecs.

In 1982, the controlling companies merged Skywest Airlines with Transwest Airlines. At the time Skywest operated 16 aircraft and TransWest 25.

Then in 1983, it was proposed to merge Skywest with East-West Airlines, both were owned by the Devereaux group. The merger did not eventuate, but east–west operated flights in Western Australia on Skywest's behalf. In 1987 Skywest lost the Government Coastwatch contract, which severely weakened the business. The company was bought out by the Perron Group and then on-sold shortly thereafter to TNT/News Limited and began operating under the Ansett banner. The east–west aircraft were divested for operations in Queensland and were later absorbed into Ansett. At this time, Skywest was operating most of its services with five BAe Jetstream 31s.

In 1998, Ansett introduced Fokker 50s into Skywest service.

=== Development since the 2000s ===
The airline continued to be owned by Ansett Australia, and operated flights on behalf of Ansett until the parent's demise in 2002. Skywest was then successfully purchased by private investors. In 2004, it was the subject of a hostile, but ultimately successful, takeover attempt by Singapore-based investment company CaptiveVision Capital. This takeover succeeded in gaining a majority stake. On 8 February 2007, news broke that the airline may be the target of a tie-up with Singapore-based Tiger Airways, although no business arrangements were ever concluded. Between 2004 and 2012, Skywest Airlines was entirely owned by CaptiveVision Capital which in turn was a subsidiary of ASX and London Stock Exchange AIM market-quoted Skywest Airlines.

Since 2004, under Skywest Airlines ownership, the fleet expanded from seven aircraft to 18 aircraft. Skywest's first Airbus A320 was registered in April 2010. It was delivered Perth on 23 October 2010 and operated charter services between Perth and Cloudbreak for Fortescue Metals Group. Skywest announced that it had optioned a second A320 on 12 May 2011.

On 10 January 2011, it was announced that Virgin Australia had established a 10-year alliance under which Skywest would operate up to 18 turboprops in the bigger carrier's colours. The alliance with the Perth-based airline was part of new push by Virgin Australia into regional Australia. The agreement saw the airlines codeshare on some of each other's flights. Virgin Australia and Skywest customers also could earn and redeem frequent flyer points on each other's networks. The aircraft were leased from Avation plc (LSE: AVAP) with the first four arriving in 2011.

In April 2012, Virgin Australia Holdings purchased 10% of Skywest Airlines, followed by a full takeover bid on 30 October 2012. It had received in principle support from the Board but the takeover would require shareholder and regulatory approval. On 11 April 2013, Virgin Australia Holdings completed its 100% acquisition of Skywest Airlines. From 7 May 2013, the use of the Skywest brand was discontinued and the airline became part of the Virgin Australia brand, however it continues to operate under its current Air Operator's Certificate and its own management team.

=== 2022 fleet changes ===
In April 2022, Virgin Australia announced its plans to phase out the Fokker 100 aircraft, and replace it with ten-year old Boeing 737-700s leased from KLM Royal Dutch Airlines. These will be operated by Virgin Australia's AOC for Virgin Australia Regional Airlines, leaving the Airbus A320 fleet solely operated by Virgin Australia Regional Airlines. The group currently operated ten F100 aircraft at the time of the order across its operations in Western Australia, with the F100 fleet gradually transitioned out and partly replaced by 737-700s from first quarter 2023.

== Destinations ==
As of July 2018, Virgin Australia Regional Airlines flew regularly to the following destinations:

Country	State	City	Airport	Notes	Refs
Australia	Indian Ocean Territories	Christmas Island	Christmas Island Airport		
Australia	Indian Ocean Territories	Cocos (Keeling) Islands	Cocos (Keeling) Islands Airport	Terminated	
Australia	Northern Territory	Alice Springs	Alice Springs Airport	Terminated	
Australia	Northern Territory	Darwin	Darwin International Airport		
Australia	Queensland	Cairns	Cairns Airport	Terminated	
Australia	Queensland	Townsville	Townsville Airport	Terminated	
Australia	South Australia	Adelaide	Adelaide Airport		
Australia	Victoria	Melbourne	Melbourne Airport	Terminated	
Australia	Western Australia	Albany	Albany Airport	Terminated	
Australia	Western Australia	Broome	Broome International Airport		
Australia	Western Australia	Busselton	Busselton Margaret River Airport	Terminated	
Australia	Western Australia	Carnarvon	Carnarvon Airport	Terminated	
Australia	Western Australia	Derby	RAAF Curtin	Terminated	
Australia	Western Australia	Esperance	Esperance Airport	Terminated	
Australia	Western Australia	Exmouth	Learmonth Airport	Terminated	
Australia	Western Australia	Geraldton	Geraldton Airport	Terminated	
Australia	Western Australia	Kalbarri	Kalbarri Airport	Terminated	
Australia	Western Australia	Kalgoorlie	Kalgoorlie–Boulder Airport		
Australia	Western Australia	Karratha	Karratha Airport		
Australia	Western Australia	Kununurra	East Kimberley Regional Airport		
Australia	Western Australia	Monkey Mia	Shark Bay Airport	Terminated	
Australia	Western Australia	Newman	Newman Airport		
Australia	Western Australia	Onslow	Onslow Airport		
Australia	Western Australia	Paraburdoo	Paraburdoo Airport	Terminated	
Australia	Western Australia	Perth	Perth Airport	Hub	
Australia	Western Australia	Port Hedland	Port Hedland International Airport		
Australia	Western Australia	Ravensthorpe	Ravensthorpe Airport	Terminated	
Indonesia	Bali	Denpasar	Ngurah Rai International Airport	Terminated	

Since Virgin Australia's take over, two original WA Coastal Network (Skywest) destinations have been cancelled (Exmouth and Busselton) with Albany, Esperance and Ravensthorpe also ending on 27 February 2016.

=== International charters ===
Commencing in 2004, Island Bound Holidays chartered a Skywest Fokker 100 to undertake flights to Bali from Port Hedland. In 2010 Skywest commenced operation of scheduled services to Bali from Port Hedland. Skywest also offered flights from Geraldton to Bali in 2011.

== Fleet ==
As of October 2026, Virgin Australia Regional Airlines operates the following aircraft:

Virgin Australia Regional fleet
Aircraft	In service	Orders	Passengers			Notes
Aircraft	In service	Orders	J	Y	Total	Notes
Embraer E190-E2	6	2	8	92	100	Deliveries from October 2025.
Total	6	2				

The fleet is used significantly in the Australian state of Western Australia, including a number of charter services which support the growing regional centres. Flights to other destinations such as Adelaide and Darwin also take place. All aircraft are fitted in an all-economy seat layout, with the majority of their flights supporting the growing Fokker 100 network in Western Australia and neighbouring states. Since March 2022, all of the A320s that were in the fleet were from the now defunct Tigerair Australia, which was a fully owned subsidiary of Virgin Australia Holdings. In August 2024, Virgin Australia announced that they had placed a firm order for eight Embraer E190-E2 aircraft. They began to enter the fleet in 2025 and replaced the remainder of the Fokker 100 and Airbus A320 aircraft.

== Loyalty program ==
In November 2007, Skywest joined the then Virgin Blue loyalty program Velocity Frequent Flyer. Velocity Points can be earned on all Virgin Australia Regional flights, excluding charter flights. Points awarded vary from 0.5 per mile to one per mile, depending on fare class.

== Accidents and incidents ==
- On 13 May 1980, a Skywest Swearingen Metro II experienced a failure of its right engine at low altitude while approaching Esperance Airport during a scheduled passenger flight, forcing the pilot to execute an emergency landing in a nearby field. The single crewmember and all eleven passengers on board evacuated the aircraft before it was destroyed in a fire.
