= No. 4 Service Flying Training School RAAF =

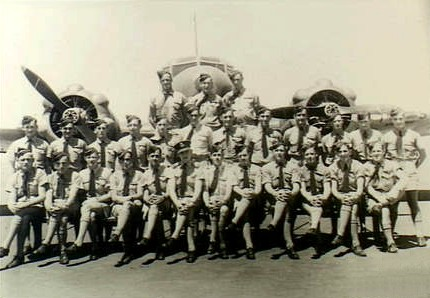
- Advanced Training Squad of No. 4 Service Flying Training School in front of an Avro Anson, December 1942
- Active: 1941–45
- Allegiance: Australia
- Branch: Royal Australian Air Force
- Role: Intermediate/advanced flying training
- Part of: Western Area Command
- Garrison/HQ: Geraldton, Western Australia
- Service: World War II

Commanders
- Notable commanders: Norman Brearley (1942–44)

Aircraft flown
- Trainer: Avro Anson

No. 4 Service Flying Training School (No. 4 SFTS) was a flying training school of the Royal Australian Air Force (RAAF) during World War II. It was formed in February 1941, and commenced flying the following month. Responsible for intermediate and advanced instruction of pilots under the Empire Air Training Scheme (EATS), the school was based at Geraldton, Western Australia, and operated Avro Anson aircraft. Two reserve squadrons were formed in response to the outbreak of war in the Pacific, though they never saw action. Flying activity was reduced towards the end of 1943, and the school was disbanded in May 1945, having graduated over 1,000 pilots. It re-formed as No. 87 Operational Base Unit, which was renamed Care and Maintenance Unit (CMU) Geraldton in May 1946. CMU Geraldton was disbanded in September 1947.

== History ==
Flying instruction in the RAAF underwent major changes following the outbreak of World War II, in response to a dramatic increase in the number of aircrew volunteers and the commencement of Australia's participation in the Empire Air Training Scheme (EATS). The Air Force's pre-war pilot training facility, No. 1 Flying Training School at RAAF Station Point Cook, Victoria, was supplanted in 1940–41 by twelve elementary flying training schools (EFTS) and eight service flying training schools (SFTS). The EFTS provided basic flying training to prospective pilots who, if successful, would go on to SFTS for further instruction that focussed on operational (or "service") flying. The course at SFTS typically consisted of two streams, intermediate and advanced, and included such techniques as instrument flying, night flying, advanced aerobatics, formation flying, dive bombing, and aerial gunnery. The total duration of training varied during the war as demand for aircrew rose and fell. Initially running for sixteen weeks, the course was cut to ten weeks (which included seventy-five hours flying time) in October 1940. A year later it was raised to twelve weeks (including 100 hours flying time), and again to sixteen weeks two months later. It continued to increase after this, peaking at twenty-eight weeks in June 1944.

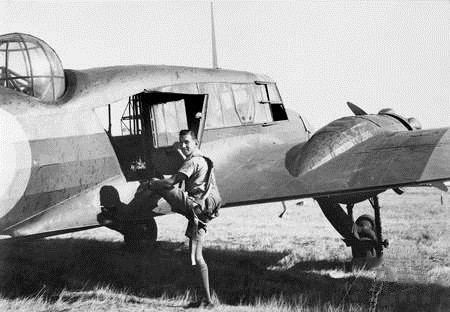
Student pilot of No. 4 Service Flying Training School boarding his Anson, March 1942

No. 4 Service Flying Training School (No. 4 SFTS) was formed at Geraldton, Western Australia, on 10 February 1941, and came under the control of Western Area Command. Its inaugural commanding officer was Wing Commander P.G. Heffernan. Geraldton's civil airport already had extensive runways, taxiways, hangars and barracks, but more buildings were required to house the RAAF trainees and unit personnel. Facilities were still under construction when the first course of flying training commenced on 10 March. A further challenge the school faced related to equipment. All its Avro Anson aircraft were transferred from other units that, according to the RAAF Historical Section, "happily disposed of their oldest air frames". Coupled with a shortage of the spare parts needed to keep such aircraft operational, the result was that flying hours remained low for some time.

No. 4 SFTS received students who had graduated from No. 9 Elementary Flying Training School at Cunderdin, Western Australia. Approximately sixty new entrants, of whom around fifty were expected to graduate, arrived at No. 4 SFTS every twenty-eight days. Discipline was strict, the aim being to cut down on the accidents that were typical of service flying training establishments. In the event, the school did not suffer a fatal flying accident for over a year-and-a-half after it commenced operations. In November 1941, eight of its Ansons took part in the search for survivors from HMAS Sydney. By this time, No. 4 SFTS was operating just over a hundred aircraft, including two Fairey Battles and two de Havilland Fox Moths, the remainder being Ansons. Personnel totalled 1,475, including 197 students. Following the outbreak of the Pacific War in December, the school's aircraft were classified as Second Line (Reserve) aircraft in the defence of Australia. Nos. 68 and 69 Reserve Squadrons were formed at Geraldton, but they were only used for maritime search-and-rescue, and saw no action before their disbandment in February 1943. On 30 September 1942, a No. 4 SFTS Anson operated by No. 68 Squadron crash-landed in a marsh 140 miles (230 km) north of Carnarvon; one crewman was killed and two injured. From October 1942 to March 1944, the school was commanded by World War I veteran and pioneer civil aviator Norman Brearley.

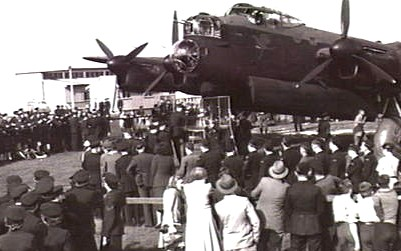
The Avro Lancaster "Queenie VI" on her visit to No. 4 Service Flying Training School, August 1943

Two men were killed and three injured when one of No. 4 SFTS's Ansons crashed after colliding with trees after takeoff at a satellite airfield on 21 July 1943; one of the injured died later without regaining consciousness. Four occupants of an Anson were killed on 1 November, when a wing disintegrated after the pilot apparently became disorientated in cloud and the plane went into a high-speed dive. By the end of the year, flying at No. 4 SFTS had begun to taper off, and it was reduced still further in 1944. Training at the school concluded in December that year, under a reorganisation of EATS establishments in Australia. No. 4 SFTS began disbanding in January 1945, as part of a general reduction in RAAF flight instruction owing to a surplus of trained aircrew, and the task was complete by May. It had graduated over 1,000 pilots—among them Dave Shannon, awarded the Distinguished Service Order for his part in the Dambuster raid by No. 617 Squadron RAF in May 1943—and established, according to the RAAF Historical Section, "an enviable safety record".

No. 87 Operational Base Unit (No. 87 OBU) was formed with No. 4 SFTS staff on 1 June 1945 to administer Geraldton's facilities and maintain its aircraft following the flying school's disbandment. On 20 May 1946, No. 87 OBU was disbanded and re-formed as Care and Maintenance Unit (CMU) Geraldton. CMU Geraldton was one of many such units that the RAAF raised for the storage and maintenance of surplus aircraft prior to their disposal after the war. It was disbanded on 5 September 1947. Most of the buildings constructed for the RAAF during the war were auctioned and removed around the same time.

A commemorative sundial in the form of an Anson wing is located at Geraldton Airport.

== Commanding officers ==
No. 4 SFTS was commanded by the following officers:

From	Name
10 March 1941	Wing Commander P.G. Heffernan
3 February 1942	Wing Commander J.R. Fleming
14 October 1942	Group Captain N. Brearley
1 March 1944	Wing Commander D.R. Chapman
