= Broome International Airport =

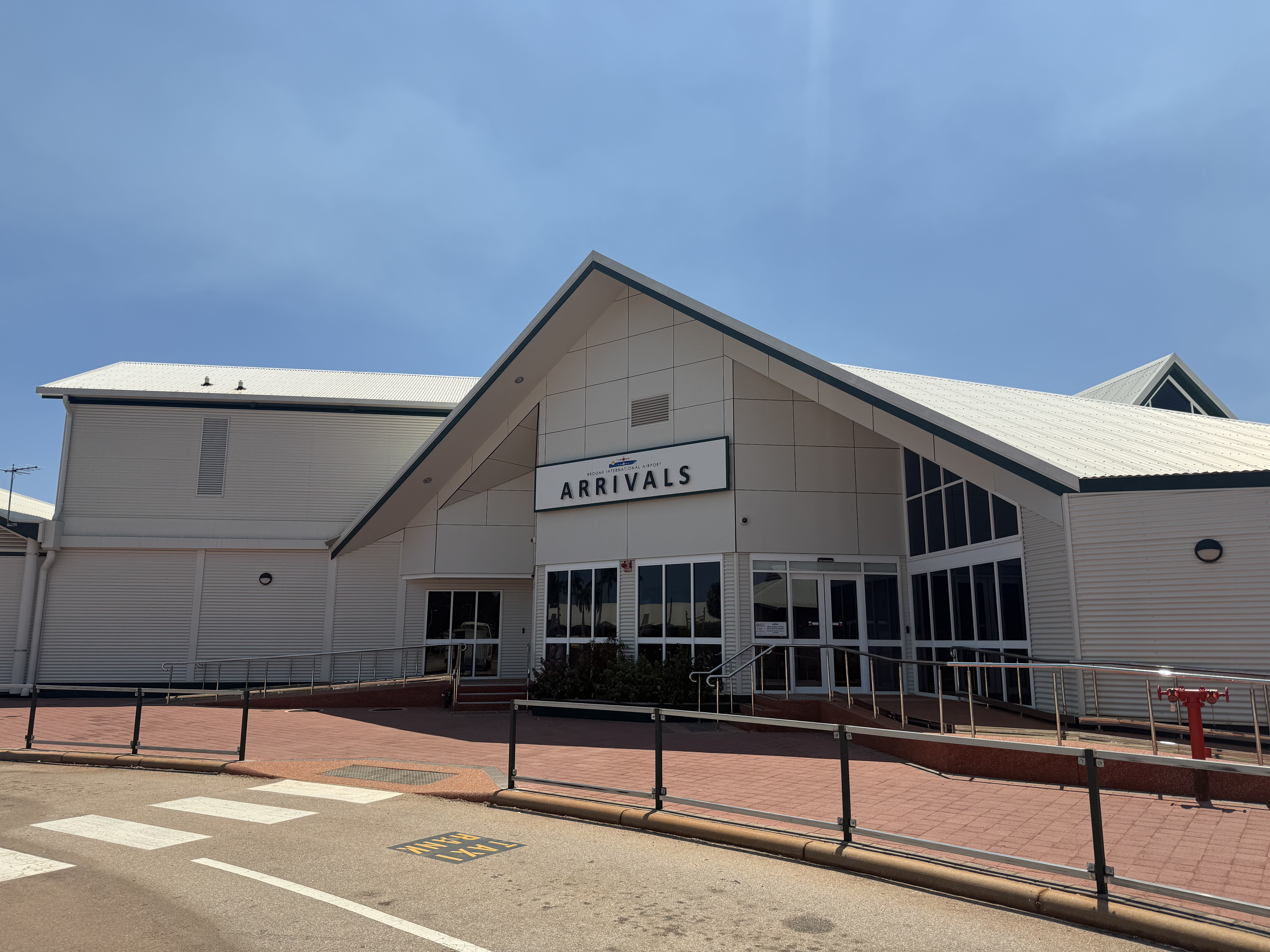
- IATA: BME; ICAO: YBRM

Summary
- Airport type: Public
- Operator: Broome International Airport
- Location: Broome, Western Australia
- Elevation AMSL: 57 ft (17 m)
- Coordinates: 17°56′59″S 122°13′40″E
- Website: www.broomeair.com.au

Maps
- Location within Western Australia Location within Australia
- Interactive map of Broome International Airport

Runways
Direction	Length		Surface
Direction	m	ft	Surface
10/28	2,368	7,769	Asphalt

Statistics (2010/11)
- Passengers: 409,663
- Aircraft movements: 5,828
- Sources: Australian AIP and aerodrome chart passenger and aircraftmovements from the BITRE

Broome International Airport (IATA: BME, ICAO: YBRM) is a regional airport located 0.4 nautical miles (0.74 km; 0.46 mi) west of the Broome GPO, Western Australia. Despite its name, as of June 2026 it does not have any international scheduled flights.

Broome International Airport is the regional hub of the northwestern part of Western Australia. It is considered the gateway to the Kimberley region. In the year ending 30 June 2011 the airport handled 409,663 passengers. It is ranked the 20th busiest airport in Australia.

== History ==
The airport first opened in 1921 as an unpaved strip of sand for airmail planes. In 1935 it was moved to its present location.

=== World War II ===
The airport field was attacked on the morning of 3 March 1942 during World War II. The attack on Broome was part of a larger Japanese campaign against northern Australia and the Dutch East Indies and resulted in the deaths of at least 88 people. At the time, the airfield was being used by the Royal Australian Air Force (RAAF) and allied forces as a staging and refuelling point.

The Japanese raid destroyed at least 22 aircraft on the ground and in the harbour, many of which had been evacuating civilians and wounded soldiers from the Dutch East Indies. Some wreckage from the attack remains preserved and can still be viewed at the Broome Historical Museum.

=== Post-war ===
In August 1993, the Broome Advertiser noted that a new international terminal facility was then under construction at the airport, and expected to be ready for the use of overseas visitors by December of that year:

The high, pitched roof building has been designed to reflect the established Broome style of architecture and will be used solely to process passengers travelling on international flights. It will accommodate full security, customs, immigration and quarantine services, including complete computer link-ups for passenger processing (..) Since March 1992, the airport has received more than 3,000 visitors from Singapore, travelling on chartered Boeing 767 aircraft.

The runway at was extended between 2004 and 2006, and in the years since, the airport has seen several enhancements to support helicopter operations. It is also equipped with firefighting facilities.

The main entryway to the airport, Macpherson Road, carries historical significance as it was named after a pioneer of the town. It was purpose-built to accommodate the telegraph cable that once ran from a point 200 metres east of the Vine walking trail, through a junction box now located on private land, to the Broome Court House, formerly known as Cable House.

On 18 November 2010, Broome International was reclassified as a Class D non-radar controlled aerodrome, meaning air traffic controllers separate aircraft using pilot position estimates and altitude reports, rather than radar tracking. The Kimberly Qantas lounge received upgrades during a broader terminal refresh between 2014 and 2015, which included landscaping and maintenance works. On 14 May 2019, the airport handled its largest aircraft to date when a Qantas A330, operating flight QF44 from Denpasar, Bali, Indonesia to Sydney, diverted to Broome due to an electrical fault.

==== International route to Singapore ====
For years, Singapore has been Broome's only seasonal international destination. The route was first introduced by SilkAir, which operated four charter flights from Changi Airport in 2018, running from 22 May to 2 June. This was repeated in 2019 from 13 June to 24 June. No flights took place in 2020 due to the COVID-19 pandemic, and SilkAir was later merged into Singapore Airlines in 2021, bringing the initial service to an end. The route remained dormant until 2024, when it was revived by Jetstar Asia as the first post-pandemic link between the two destinations. This seasonal service operated from 25 June to 26 October 2024.

Encouraged by the response, Jetstar Asia resumed the route in 2025, beginning on 1 April with plans to run flights until 25 October. However, the season was cut short, with services ending on 31 July following the announcement that Jetstar Asia would cease operations by that date.

== Airlines and destinations ==
Airlines	Destinations
Airnorth	Darwin, Kununurra
Nexus Airlines	Geraldton, Karratha, Port Hedland
Qantas	Perth; Seasonal: Melbourne, Sydney
QantasLink	Perth
Skippers Aviation	Fitzroy Crossing, Halls Creek
Virgin Australia	Perth
Virgin Australia Regional Airlines	Perth; Charter: West Angelas

== Operations ==
Busiest domestic routes into and out of Broome Airport (FY 2012)
Rank	Airport	Passengers carried	% change
1	Perth Airport	313,627	▼2.7

== Accidents and incidents ==
- On 21 January 1974, Douglas C-47A PK-GDC of the Burmah Oil Co was damaged beyond economic repair in an accident.
- On 11 July 2012, a Piper PA-34 Seneca of Golden Eagle Airlines crashed into sand dunes near the runway threshold. The aircraft, registration VH-LCK was operating a scheduled cargo flight to Port Hedland in good weather conditions at night. The pilot was the sole occupant. He was killed in the accident. Investigations by the Australian Transport Safety Bureau into the cause of the accident found that the collision was due to a likely loss of engine power.
- On 19 March 2026, a Cessna 441 Conquest twin turboprop plane carrying seven people; two pilots and five passengers, and bound for Mungalalu Truscott Airbase, crashed into Roebuck Bay shortly after takeoff. None of the occupants were killed.

== See also ==
- Attack on Broome
- Broome Seaplane Base
- Australian Overland Telegraph Line
- List of airports in Western Australia
- Aviation transport in Australia
- Submarine communications cable
