= V Australia =

Australian airline

IATA	ICAO	Call sign
VA	VAU	VEE-OZ
- Founded: 26 May 2004
- Commenced operations: 27 February 2009
- Ceased operations: 7 December 2011 (merged into Virgin Australia)
- Hubs: Sydney Airport
- Frequent-flyer program: Velocity Frequent Flyer
- Fleet size: 5
- Destinations: 5
- Parent company: Virgin Australia Holdings
- Headquarters: Bowen Hills, Queensland, Australia
- Website: www.vaustralia.com

V Australia was a long-haul international airline owned by Virgin Australia Holdings that commenced operating on 27 February 2009. As part of a rebranding of all of Virgin Australia Holdings' subsidiaries, on 7 December 2011, it was subsumed into Virgin Australia.

== History ==
=== Naming competition ===
The name of the airline was decided in the same way that Virgin Blue's own name was found, with a public naming competition conducted in June 2007. On 25 June 2007, Virgin Blue released the eight finalists of the naming competition. They were Amelia Blue, Australia Blue, Didgeree Blue, Liberty Blue, Matilda Blue, V Australia Airlines, Virgin Australia and Virgin Pacific. Australia Blue and Virgin Pacific were early favourites to win the competition, despite a problem with the latter, as Singapore Airlines (through its stake in Virgin Atlantic) had control over the use of the 'Virgin' name on international air routes, and had not, in the past, allowed its use. On 25 July 2007, Virgin Blue announced that V Australia would be the name of the new carrier, with the runner up of the competition, Didgeree Blue, to be the name of the airline's first plane.

=== Creation ===
In early 2006, Virgin Blue announced its intention to operate up to seven flights a week to the United States through either Los Angeles or San Francisco, saying that the route was needed to make the airline as profitable as possible. The airline was given permission for ten flights a week to the United States by Australian regulators on 24 July 2007. The plans were approved by US regulators on 15 February 2008, due to the signing of an open skies agreement between Australia and the US. V Australia was then allowed unlimited capacity between Australia and the U.S. by the Australian International Air Services Commission.

V Australia later applied to the United States Department of Transportation to operate services to and from Sydney to Los Angeles, San Francisco, Seattle, Las Vegas, and New York. Permission from the United States Department of Transportation was given after the signing of the open skies agreement.

=== First aircraft ===
V Australia placed orders with Boeing for six Boeing 777-300ER aircraft. Pending delivery of the six aircraft, V Australia leased its first Boeing 777-300ER from the International Lease Finance Corporation; named Didgeree Blue, it was delivered to V Australia at Boeing's Seattle headquarters on 26 January 2009. On 9 February Didgeree Blue touched down at Sydney Airport after flying from Seattle via Los Angeles where it was launched to the US press by Sir Richard Branson and Australian celebrities Julian McMahon and Holly Valance. In 2010, two of the Boeing 777 orders were converted to options for delivery in 2012.

V Australia commenced passenger services on 27 February 2009. On 17 August 2009, V Australia announced that it would expand on its Brisbane/Sydney to Los Angeles routes. It was announced that the airline would fly from Melbourne to Johannesburg, Los Angeles and Phuket; as well as Brisbane to Phuket. V Australia also announced on 17 August 2009 that it had applied to fly between Australia and Fiji. V Australia also considered routes to China, according to an interview with Sir Richard Branson.

In August 2010 it was announced that due to the unprofitability of some routes, V Australia would cease its 777-300ER services to Johannesburg and Phuket. On 24 February 2011, the aircraft were redeployed on services between Sydney and Abu Dhabi to coincide with the partnership between V Australia and Etihad Airways.

== Destinations ==
V Australia had served the following destinations prior to being absorbed into Virgin Australia in December 2011.

Australia

- Brisbane (Brisbane Airport)
- Melbourne (Melbourne Airport)
- Sydney (Sydney Airport) Hub

Fiji

- Nadi (Nadi International Airport) (terminated prior to merger)

South Africa

- Johannesburg (O. R. Tambo International Airport) (terminated prior to merger)

Thailand

- Phuket (Phuket International Airport) (terminated prior to merger)

United Arab Emirates

- Abu Dhabi (Zayed International Airport)

United States

- Los Angeles (Los Angeles International Airport)

=== Codeshare & interline agreements ===
V Australia had interline agreements with Alaska Airlines to Seattle; Delta Air Lines; and Horizon Air to Portland. It was announced on 26 August 2010 that V Australia had signed a codeshare and interline agreement with Middle Eastern carrier Etihad Airlines, giving Virgin passengers access to 65 destinations in Europe and the Middle East.

Within Virgin-branded airlines, V Australia offered codeshare services with Virgin Australia throughout its network in Oceania, and to and from New Zealand with Pacific Blue Airlines. V Australia also had an interline agreement with Virgin America to Boston, Las Vegas, San Francisco, New York City, Seattle and Washington DC. Virgin America and V Australia shared terminal facilities at Los Angeles International Airport's Terminal 3; inbound V Australia flights used to arrive at the Tom Bradley International Terminal, as of November 2011, inbound flights arrived at Terminal 5. All V Australia connections were through Los Angeles International Airport. US interline passengers were transferred onto V Australia to a destination within Australia.

== Fleet ==
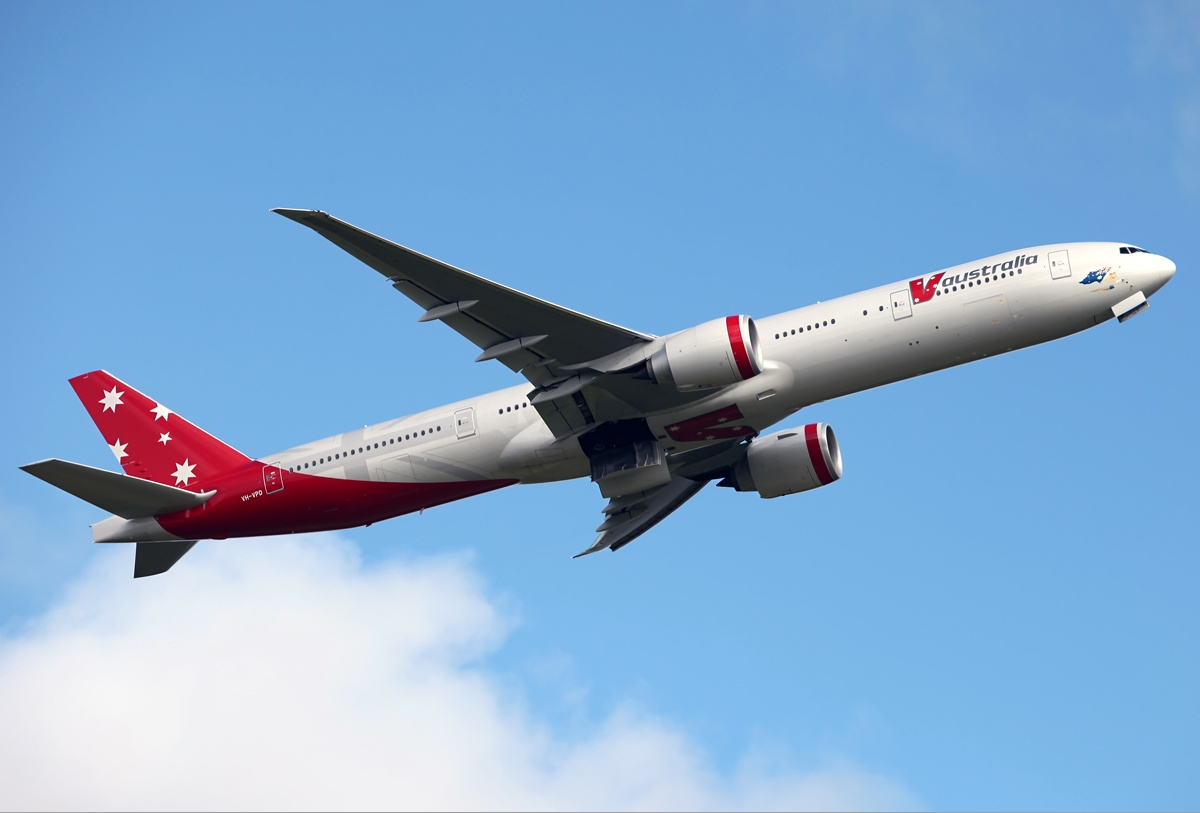
V Australia only operated the Boeing 777-300ER in its fleet

In September 2011, V Australia operated an all-Boeing 777-300ER fleet composed of the following aircraft:

V Australia Fleet
Aircraft	In Fleet	Passengers			
Aircraft	In Fleet	J	P	Y	Total
Boeing 777-300ER	5	33	40	280	353

== Services ==
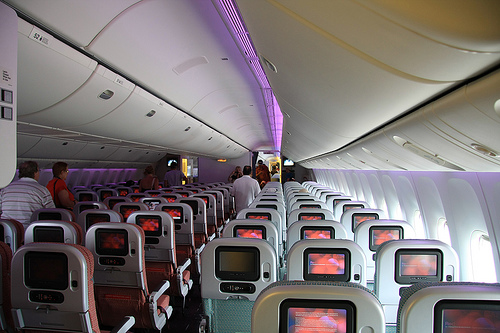
International Economy cabin on a Boeing 777-300ER

=== Cabin classes ===
V Australia offered a three-class service on its Boeing 777-300ER aircraft: International Business Class, International Premium Economy Class and International Economy Class. All three classes featured ambient Mood Lighting relative to the time of day or night, similar to that of sister airline Virgin America.

International Business Class International Business class had a 2-3-2 configuration with fully horizontal flat beds that are 188 cm (6 ft 2 in) long and seat pitch of 77". There was a personal workstation with laptop power, USB slot and reading light. Business Class In-Flight entertainment had a 12.1" touchscreen PTV with AVOD on every seat.

International Premium Economy Class Premium Economy class had a 2-4-2 configuration. Premium Economy had all-leather seats with a 38" seat pitch, 20" seat width and a 9" seat recline. The seats were equipped with adjustable headrests and footrests. There was a personal workstation with laptop power, USB slot and reading light. Premium Economy class In-Flight entertainment had a 10.6" touchscreen PTV with AVOD on every seat.

International Economy Class International Economy class had a 3-3-3 configuration. Economy seats had a 32" seat pitch, 18.8" seat width and seat recline of up to 6". USB slots were available to power laptops and other personal devices (MP3 Players etc.). Economy class In-Flight entertainment had a 9" touchscreen PTV with AVOD on every seat.

=== In-flight entertainment ===
V Australia's In-Flight entertainment RED was based on the Panasonic eX2 system. RED was fully touch-screen and handset controlled and there was no fee for use. It featured an extensive video on demand library that included new release film, TV series and TV programmes. Destination guides were also available. Other functions available through RED included music on demand (approx 200+ CD library) and video games. Seat-to-seat chat was available as well as in flight map and flight information.

=== Lounge access ===
Lounge access was available when flying V Australia for International Business Class passengers and Velocity Gold members only. Velocity Gold allowed access regardless of class of travel. Both V Australia Business Class and Premium Economy Class passengers connecting to V Australia on Virgin Australia flights domestically within Australia were entitled to access Virgin Australia's domestic lounges on the day of travel. At the time services ceased, V Australia used Air New Zealand's Koru Lounge in Sydney, Melbourne and Brisbane; Alaska Airlines' Board Room lounge in Los Angeles (Terminal 3) and Etihad Airways' Lounge in Abu Dhabi.
