= Virgin Australia Airlines =

Virgin Australia Airlines may refer to:

- Virgin Australia, Australian airline
- Virgin Australia Airlines (NZ), New Zealand airline
