= Vau =

VAU or Vau can mean:

- V Australia, an Australian airline company, part of the Virgin conglomerate
- Vau, Óbidos, a village in Óbidos, Portugal municipality
- Waw, a letter in several Semitic alphabets
- digamma, an obsolete letter in the Greek alphabet
- Vau, Algarve, a village in Algarve, Portugal
