= List of Virgin Australia destinations =

Virgin Australia (known as Virgin Blue until early 2011) is an Australian airline, with headquarters in Brisbane, Australia. A number of hubs are located throughout Australia.

Virgin Australia previously suspended flights from 30 March 2020 to all international destinations "in response to expanded government travel restrictions and increased impacts from COVID-19 on travel demand", as well as several destinations in Australia.

== Destinations ==
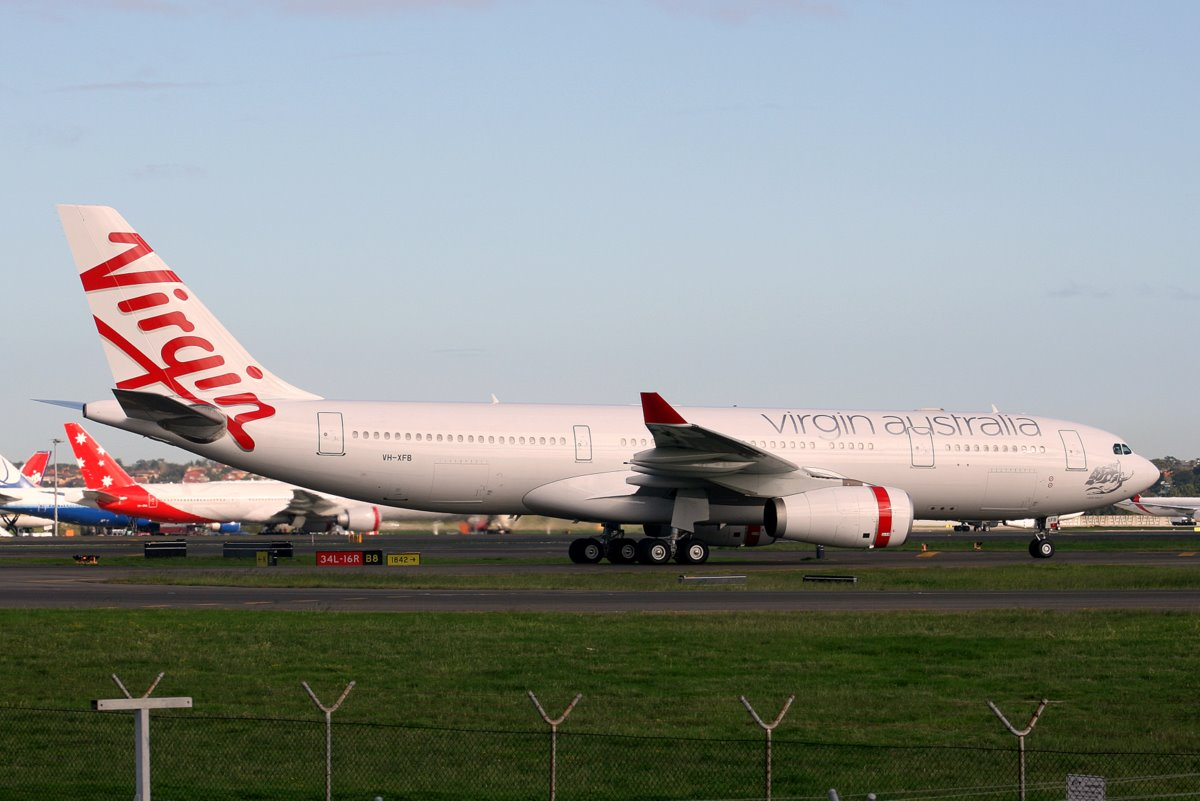
Cable Beach, Virgin Australia's first A330-200.

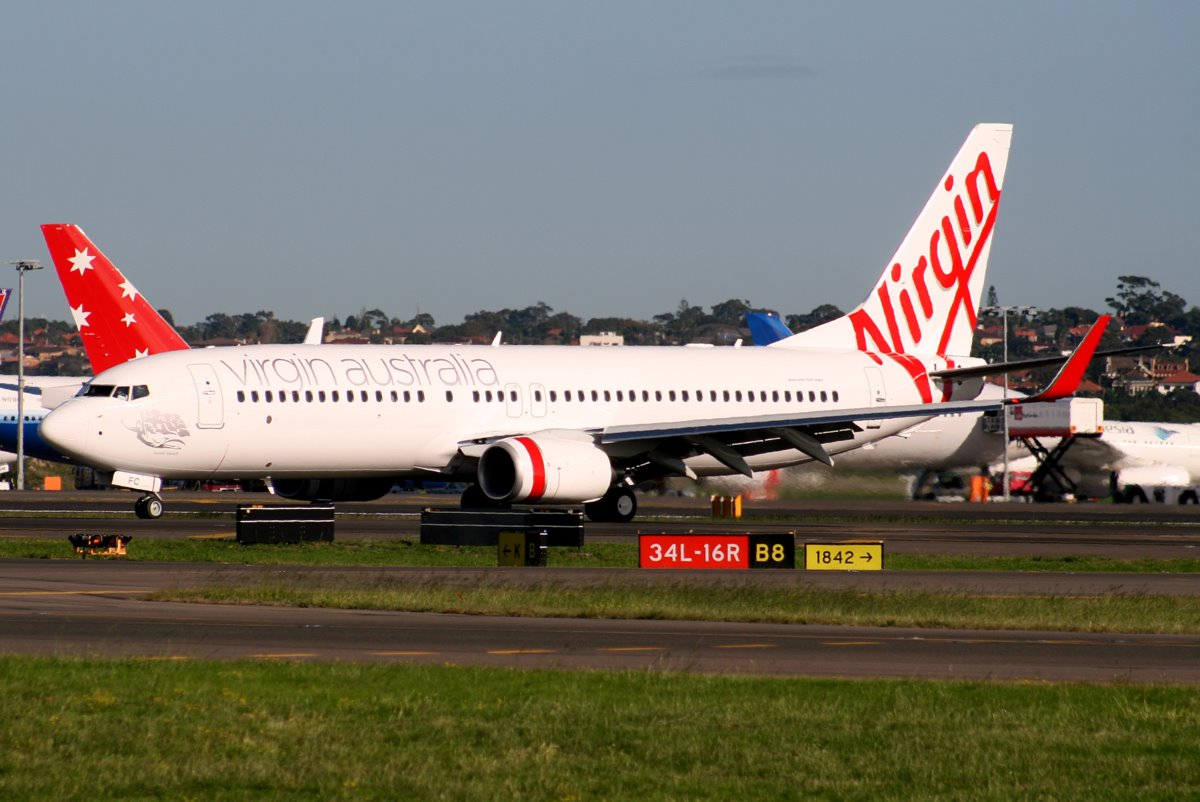
Bondi Beach, first Boeing 737-800 to wear Virgin Australia livery.

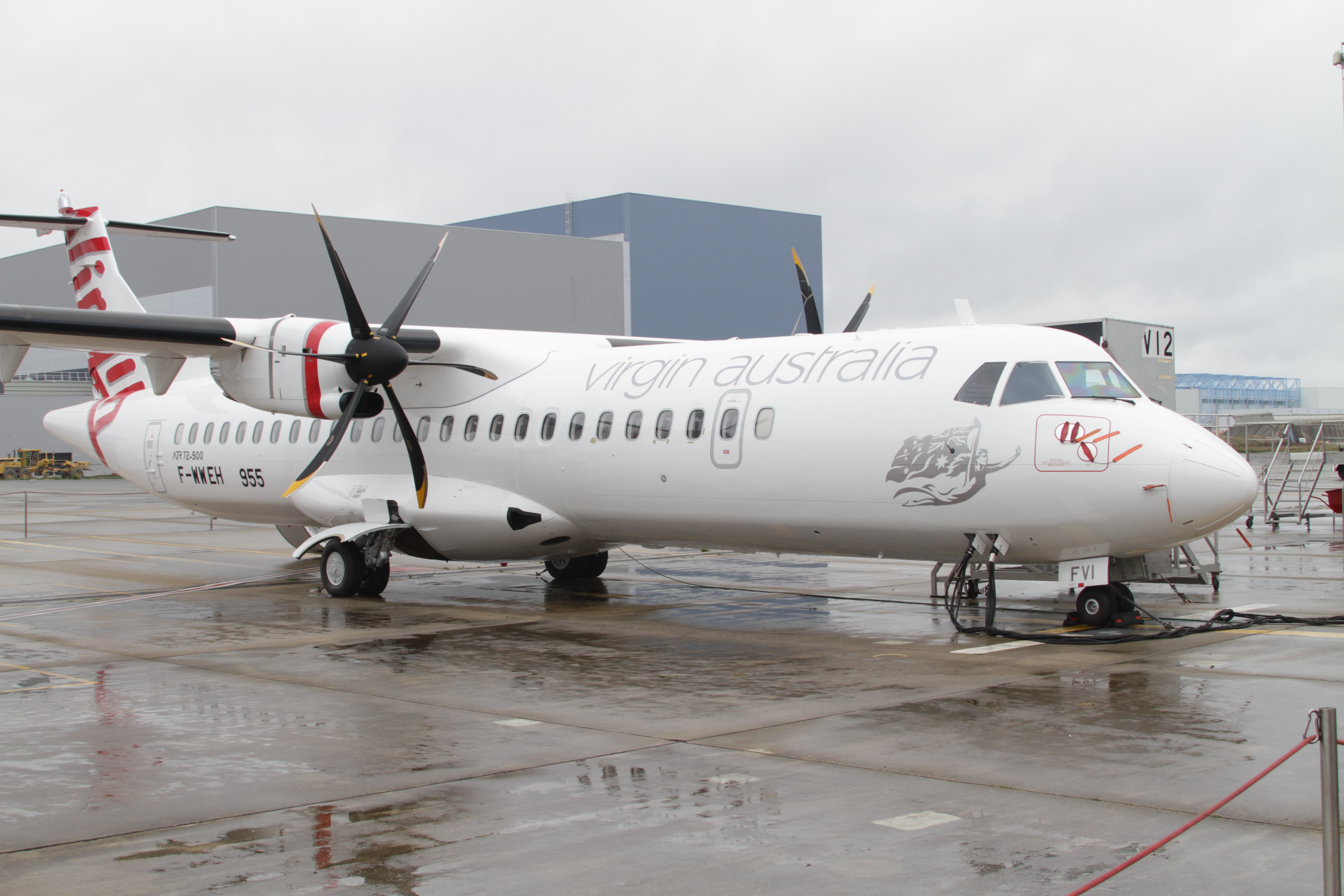
Former ATR 72-500 in Virgin Australia livery.

Virgin Australia (and Virgin Australia Regional Airlines) currently serve 32 domestic and four international destinations as of August 2026

Country	City	Airport	Notes	Refs
Australia	Adelaide	Adelaide Airport	Hub	
Australia	Albany	Albany Airport	Terminated	
Australia	Albury	Albury Airport	Terminated	
Australia	Alice Springs	Alice Springs Airport		
Australia	Ayers Rock	Ayers Rock Airport	Terminated	
Australia	Ballina	Ballina Byron Gateway Airport		
Australia	Brisbane	Brisbane Airport	Hub	
Australia	Broome	Broome Airport		
Australia	Bundaberg	Bundaberg Airport	Terminated	
Australia	Busselton	Busselton Margaret River Airport	Terminated	
Australia	Cairns	Cairns Airport		
Australia	Canberra	Canberra Airport		
Australia	Carnarvon	Carnarvon Airport	Terminated	
Australia	Christmas Island	Christmas Island Airport	Terminated	
Australia	Cloncurry	Cloncurry Airport	Terminated	
Australia	Cocos Islands	Cocos (Keeling) Island Airport	Terminated	
Australia	Coffs Harbour	Coffs Harbour Airport	Terminated	
Australia	Darwin	Darwin Airport		
Australia	Derby	RAAF Base Curtin	Terminated	
Australia	Emerald	Emerald Airport		
Australia	Esperance	Esperance Airport	Terminated	
Australia	Exmouth	RAAF Base Learmonth		
Australia	Geraldton	Geraldton Airport	Terminated	
Australia	Gladstone	Gladstone Airport		
Australia	Gold Coast	Gold Coast Airport	Focus city	
Australia	Hamilton Island	Great Barrier Reef Airport		
Australia	Hervey Bay	Hervey Bay Airport	Terminated	
Australia	Hobart	Hobart Airport		
Australia	Kalbarri	Kalbarri Airport	Terminated	
Australia	Kalgoorlie	Kalgoorlie Airport		
Australia	Karratha	Karratha Airport		
Australia	Kununurra	East Kimberly Regional Airport		
Australia	Launceston	Launceston Airport		
Australia	Mackay	Mackay Airport		
Australia	Melbourne	Melbourne Airport	Hub	
Australia	Mildura	Mildura Airport	Terminated	
Australia	Monkey Mia	Shark Bay Airport	Terminated	
Australia	Moranbah	Moranbah Airport	Terminated	
Australia	Mount Isa	Mount Isa Airport		
Australia	Newcastle, NSW	Newcastle Airport		
Australia	Newman	Newman Airport		
Australia	Olympic Dam	Olympic Dam Airport		
Australia	Onslow	Onslow Airport		
Australia	Paraburdoo	Paraburdoo Airport	Terminated	
Australia	Perth	Perth Airport	Hub	
Australia	Port Hedland	Port Hedland Airport		
Australia	Port Macquarie	Port Macquarie Airport	Terminated	
Australia	Proserpine	Whitsunday Coast Airport		
Australia	Ravensthorpe	Ravensthorpe Airport	Terminated	
Australia	Rockhampton	Rockhampton Airport		
Australia	Sunshine Coast	Sunshine Coast Airport		
Australia	Sydney	Sydney Airport	Hub	
Australia	Tamworth	Tamworth Airport	Terminated	
Australia	Townsville	Townsville Airport		
Australia	Wollongong	Shellharbour Airport	Terminated	
Cook Islands	Rarotonga	Rarotonga International Airport	Terminated	
Fiji	Nadi	Nadi International Airport		
Hong Kong	Hong Kong	Hong Kong International Airport	Terminated	
Indonesia	Denpasar	Ngurah Rai International Airport	Focus city	
Japan	Tokyo	Haneda Airport	Terminated	
New Zealand	Auckland	Auckland Airport	Terminated	
New Zealand	Christchurch	Christchurch Airport	Terminated	
New Zealand	Dunedin	Dunedin Airport	Terminated	
New Zealand	Hamilton	Hamilton Airport	Terminated	
New Zealand	Queenstown	Queenstown Airport		
New Zealand	Wellington	Wellington Airport	Terminated	
Papua New Guinea	Port Moresby	Jacksons International Airport	Terminated	
Qatar	Doha	Hamad International Airport	Operated by Qatar Airways	
Samoa	Apia	Faleolo International Airport	Terminated	
Solomon Islands	Honiara	Honiara International Airport	Terminated	
South Africa	Johannesburg	O. R. Tambo International Airport	Terminated	
Thailand	Phuket	Phuket International Airport	Terminated	
Tonga	Nukuʻalofa	Fuaʻamotu International Airport	Terminated	
United Arab Emirates	Abu Dhabi	Abu Dhabi International Airport	Terminated	
United States	Los Angeles	Los Angeles International Airport	Terminated	
Vanuatu	Port Vila	Bauerfield International Airport		

Virgin Australia operates flights to Bali, Cairns and Townsville but Virgin Australia Regional has terminated them. Since Virgin Australia's takeover of Skywest, two original WA Coastal Network (Skywest) destinations have been cancelled (Exmouth & Busselton) with Albany, Esperance and Ravensthorpe also ending on 27 February 2016.

=== Codeshare and interline agreements ===
Currently, Virgin Australia has agreements with airlines including United Airlines, Singapore Airlines, Qatar Airways (Etihad Airways previously), and Air Canada.

It was announced on 26 August 2010 that Virgin Australia had signed a codeshare and interline agreement with Etihad Airways, giving Virgin passengers access to 65 destinations in Europe and the Middle East.

Virgin America and Virgin Australia International Airlines shared terminal facilities at Los Angeles International Airport's Terminal 3, however, when Virgin Australia's service ended only the check-in desks were located there, both inbound and outbound Virgin Australia flights arrived and departed from the Tom Bradley International Terminal.

United Airlines and Virgin Australia announced on 15 December 2021 that beginning in April 2022, a new partnership between the two would see the longer than a decade partnership with Delta Air Lines be scrapped.

On 11 December 2024, Qatar Airways announced that passengers can begin booking air tickets for direct routes to Doha from Sydney, Brisbane and Perth on behalf of Virgin Australia for travels commencing June 2025 onwards. This collaboration will also see Melbourne to be added in the mix later the same year. This deal brought about the announced end of the Virgin Australia an Etihad Airways Partnership - due to end on the 1st of June 2025.
