= Virgin Australia =

Australian airline

Virgin Australia Airlines Pty Ltd

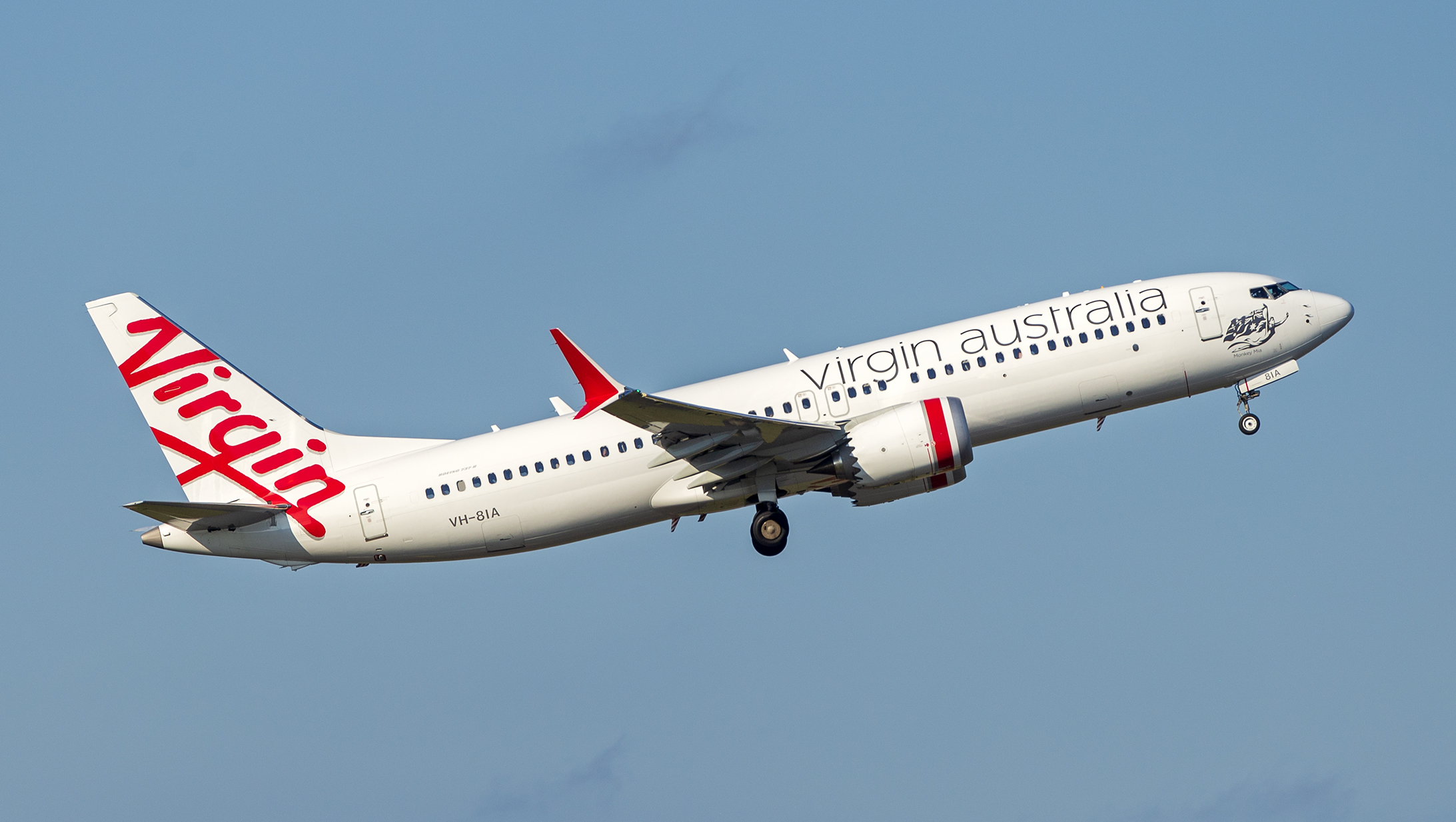
- Virgin Australia Boeing 737 MAX 8
| IATA | ICAO | Call sign |
|---|---|---|
| VA (Note: From their foundation until January 2013, Virgin Blue/Virgin Australia and Pacific Blue used the IATA code 'DJ'. From its foundation Virgin Australia International Airlines (formerly known as V Australia) operated under a different IATA code, 'VA'. Use of the two codes continued from the May 2011 company reorganisation and rebranding until January 2013, with the long-haul flights operated by the Boeing 777 fleet using the 'VA' code. In January 2013, use of the IATA code 'DJ' was discontinued and all flights now use the code 'VA'.) | VOZ | VELOCITY |
- Founded: 29 August 2000; 26 years ago (as Virgin Blue)
- Commenced operations: 4 May 2011; 15 years ago (as Virgin Australia)
- AOC #: CASA.AOC.0010
- Hubs: Brisbane; Melbourne; Sydney
- Secondary hubs: Adelaide; Perth
- Focus cities: Denpasar; Gold Coast
- Frequent-flyer program: Velocity
- Fleet size: 109
- Destinations: 36
- Parent company: Virgin Australia Holdings
- Headquarters: South Bank, Queensland, Australia
- Key people: Peter Warne (chairman); Dave Emerson (CEO)
- Founders: Richard Branson; Brett Godfrey (former CEO)
- Revenue: ▲ A$5.81 billion (FY2024-25)
- Operating income: ▲ A$664 million (FY2024-25)
- Total assets: ▼ A$4.872 billion (FY2024-25)
- Total equity: ▼ A$814.6 million (FY2024-25)
- Website: www.virginaustralia.com

Virgin Australia, formerly known as Virgin Blue, is an Australian airline based in Brisbane, Queensland. It is one of two active airlines (the other being Virgin Atlantic) to use the Virgin brand, as well as the larger by fleet size. It commenced services on 31 August 2000 with two aircraft on a single route, before suddenly emerging as a major airline in Australia's domestic market after the collapse of Ansett Australia in September 2001. With the airline's business model incorporating features of both a low-cost and full-service airline, it has since grown to become Australia's largest domestic airline by passenger market share, as of December 2024. As of June 2025, the airline serves 33 destinations across Australia with its Boeing 737 fleets, operating from its hubs in Brisbane, Melbourne and Sydney, as well as from its secondary hubs in Adelaide and Perth. The airline also operates a limited number of short-haul international flights.

The airline's headquarters are based in South Bank, Queensland. It was co-founded by British businessman Richard Branson (the founder of Virgin Group), and former CEO Brett Godfrey.

In 2011, the airline went through a period of transformation, changing its brand to Virgin Australia. This included the introduction of a new aircraft livery, new uniforms, and new onboard menu options, as well as a business class product, which Virgin Blue did not have. New wide-body aircraft were acquired to compete with Qantas, and business class was rolled out across the Virgin Australia network.

On 21 April 2020, Virgin Australia Holdings went into voluntary administration, due to the impacts of the COVID-19 pandemic and financial troubles in the years leading up to the pandemic. On 26 June 2020, it was announced that Bain Capital had entered into a sale and implementation deed with administrator Deloitte to acquire Virgin Australia. Creditors agreed to this proposal on 4 September 2020, with the reorganisation and change of ownership completed on 17 November. The airline announced that as part of its relaunch, it would focus on being a mid-market "hybrid" carrier.

== History ==
=== Early years as Virgin Blue (2000–2006) ===
Virgin Australia was launched as Virgin Blue, a low-cost airline, in August 2000, with two Boeing 737-400 aircraft, one of which was leased from then-sister airline Virgin Express. Initially offering seven return flights a day between Brisbane and Sydney, this was expanded to cover all major Australian cities and many holiday destinations. The Virgin Blue name was the result of an open competition; it was a play on the predominantly red livery and the Australian slang tradition of calling a red-headed male 'Blue' or 'Bluey'. This term has been used by the older generation, also known as the boomer generation.

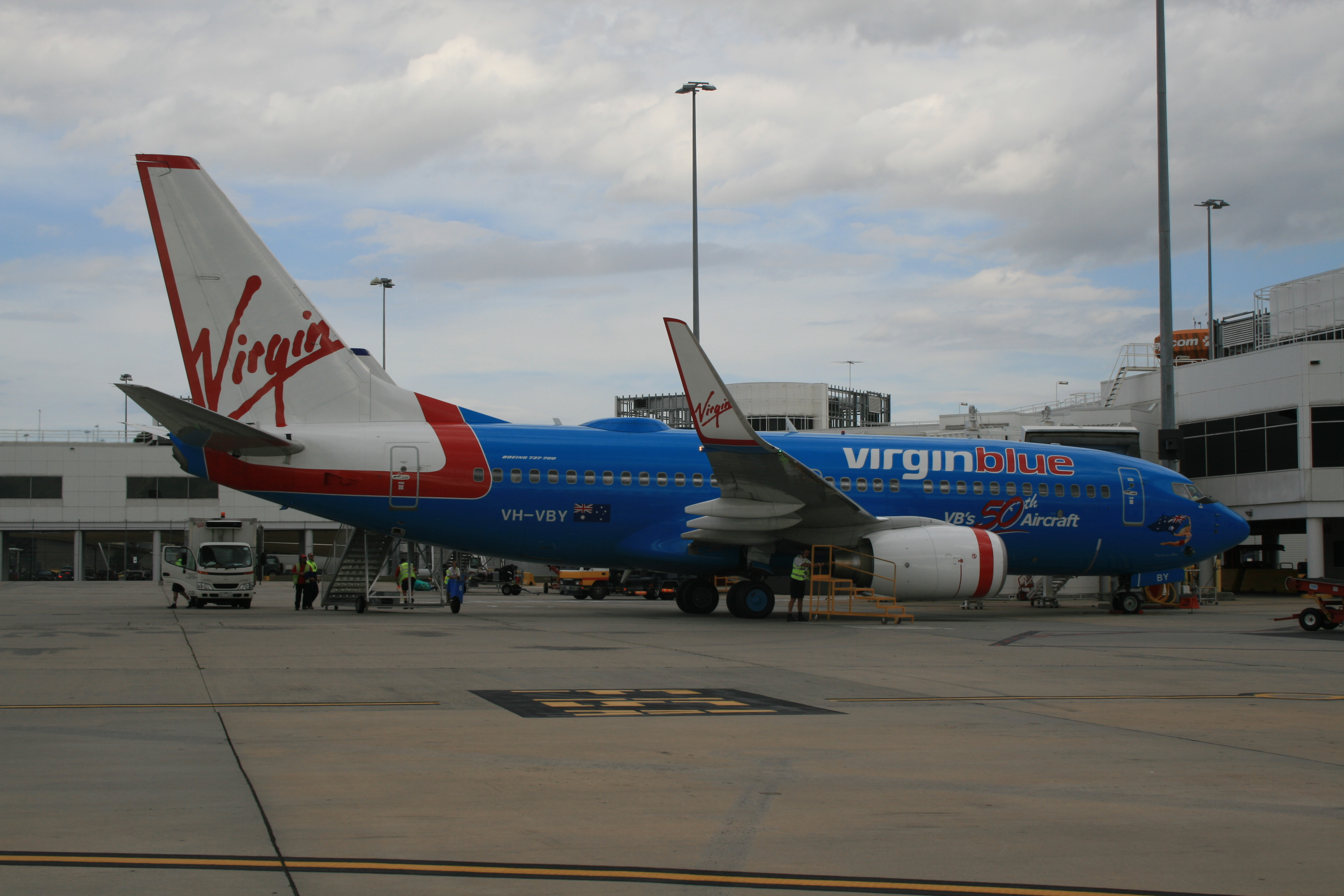
Virgin Blue's 50th Boeing 737 Virginia Blue was the only aircraft in the fleet to be actually painted blue. This aircraft is now in Virgin Australia livery.

The timing of Virgin Blue's entry into the Australian market was fortunate as it was able to fill the vacuum created by the failure of Ansett Australia in September 2001. Ansett's failure allowed Virgin to grow rapidly to become Australia's second domestic carrier rather than staying just a cut-price alternative to the established players. It also gave Virgin access to terminal space, without which growth would have been significantly limited. Delays in negotiating access to the former Ansett terminal at Sydney Airport however, forced Virgin to use its original terminal there—a collection of prefabricated buildings without aerobridges—longer than was needed. The airline's corporate and operations functions were located in its headquarters building at 112 Barry Parade in Fortitude Valley, Brisbane.

In May 2006, Toll Holdings acquired Patrick and became the majority owner of Virgin Blue. In July 2008, Toll sold its majority holding via a special dividend to hold 1.7% of the company. In June 2013, Air New Zealand owned 23% of the company.

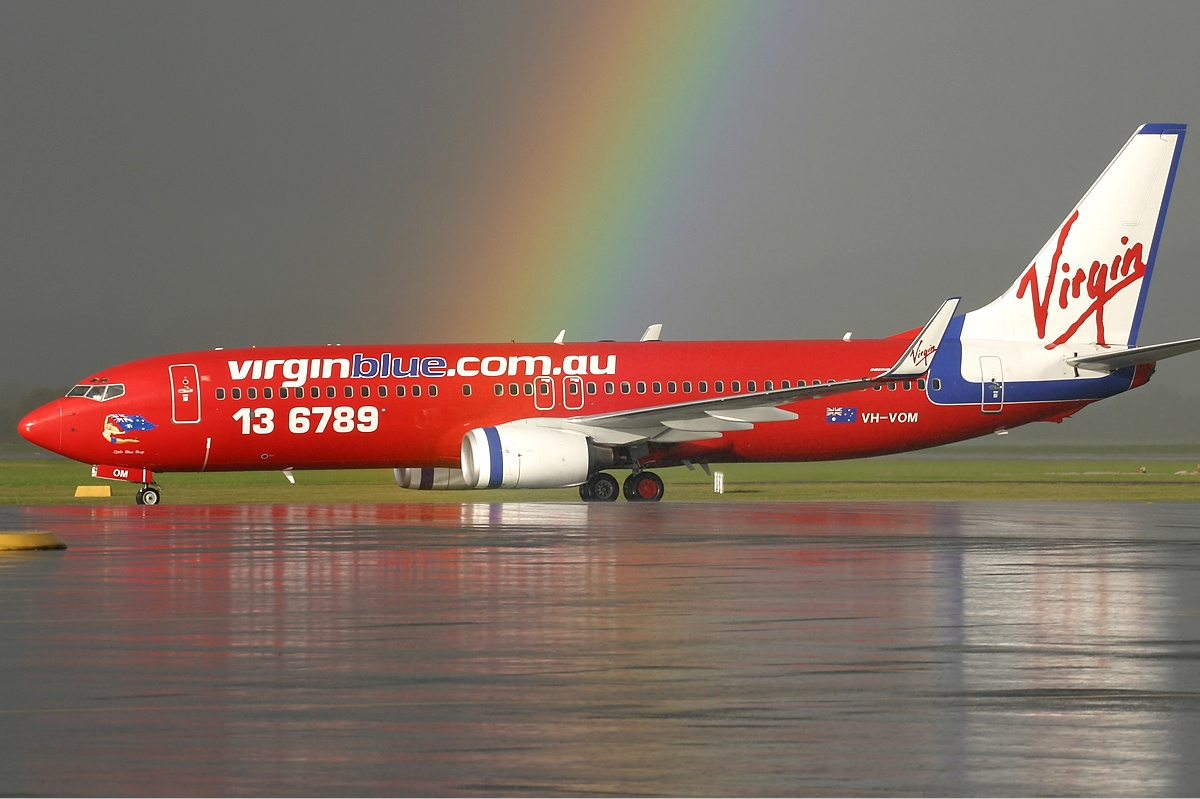
Boeing 737-800 in the old Virgin Blue red livery at Perth Airport in 2004

Virgin Blue previously used a familiar formula pioneered by airlines such as Southwest Airlines and Ryanair of eliminating costs such as included in-flight meals and printed tickets in favour of selling food on-board and using telephone and internet booking systems. It also cut costs in the past by limiting the number of airports serviced and by operating one type of aircraft, the Boeing 737. This strategy changed with the introduction of a second type into the fleet. The airline ordered 20 Embraer E-jets, in a mix of six E170s and 14 E190s. These were ordered specifically so that the airline could re-enter the Sydney–Canberra market that it abandoned in 2004, and to fly to less populous areas. The first E170 arrived in Australia in September 2007, and by the end of the year, the three on initial order had been delivered. These were placed on limited-frequency services before full-scale operations were launched on 4 February 2008 with services from Sydney to Canberra (branded as 'Capital Jet' services), Mackay in Queensland, and the New South Wales regional centres of Port Macquarie and Albury, which were promoted with a one-cent fare. The flights to Canberra and the regional centres signified an effort to compete more directly with Qantas and its subsidiary QantasLink operation, which flies to all three cities, and with independent Regional Express Airlines.

=== Codesharing and network consolidation (2006–2010) ===
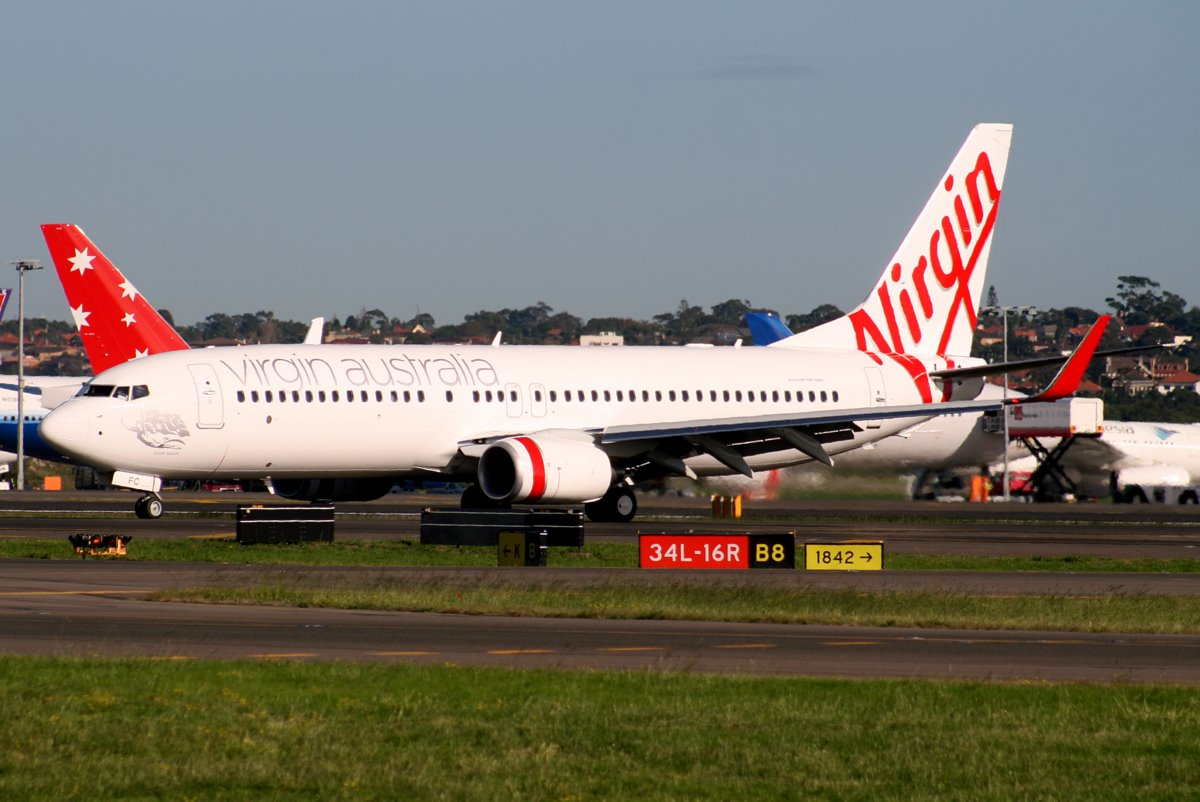
The first Virgin Australia Boeing 737 to wear the airline's new livery arrives at Sydney Airport for the launch of the new brand.

When Virgin Blue launched in 2000, it did not have interline or marketing alliances with other airlines. This changed after the collapse of domestic competitor Ansett Australia, when Virgin Blue began a codeshare agreement with United Airlines, enabling United passengers to connect from the United States to Virgin Blue's Australian destinations not served by United.

In 2006, Virgin Blue began forming partnerships to compete with Qantas. It established frequent flyer agreements with Emirates, Hawaiian Airlines, and Malaysia Airlines. The airline also had an interline agreement with Regional Express Airlines for access to smaller regional centres in eastern Australia, and operated two routes in Western Australia through Virgin Australia Regional Airlines.

In November 2007, Virgin Blue announced an agreement with Garuda Indonesia, allowing domestic passengers to transfer to international Garuda flights from Perth, Melbourne, Sydney, or Darwin. A similar agreement was later made with Vietnam Airlines, providing connections from Melbourne and Sydney to destinations in Vietnam via its network.

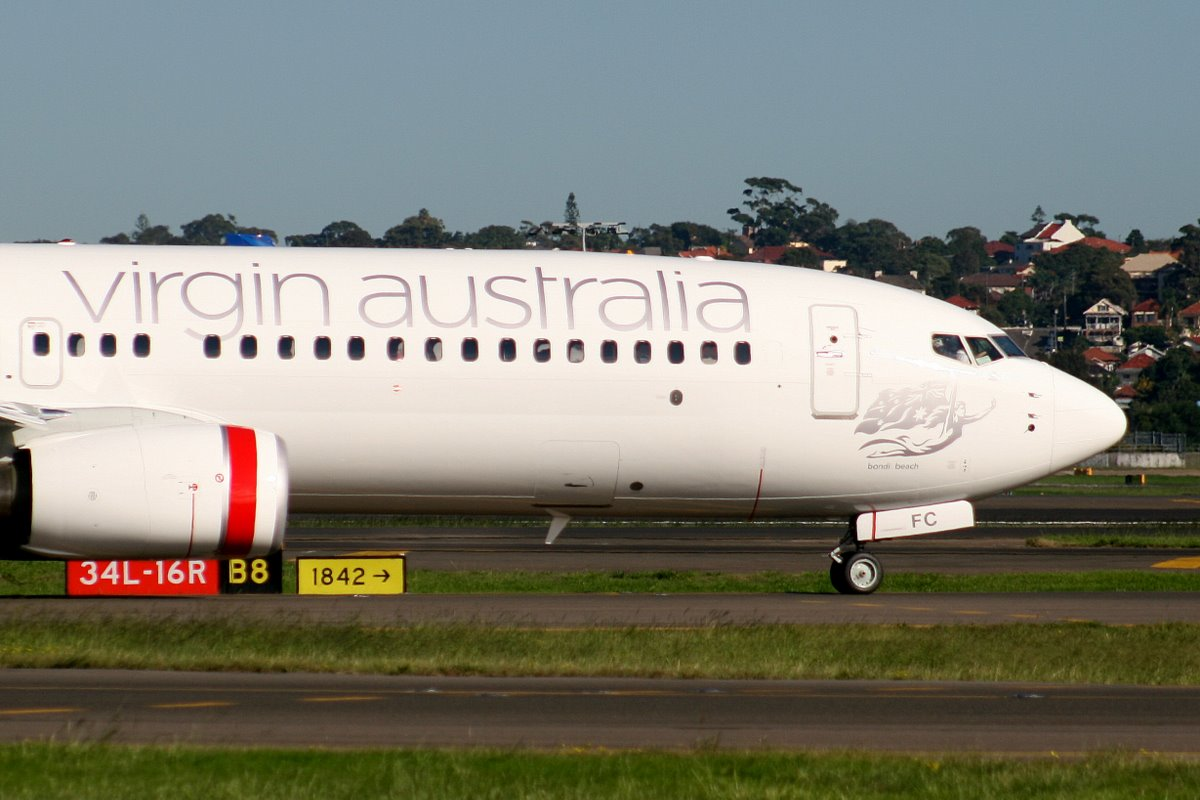
Close-up of the new Virgin Australia titles on Boeing 737 Bondi Beach, at Sydney Airport for the launch of the new brand

The former Virgin Blue logo, used until May 2011

In 2008, business class was introduced throughout its entire fleet. New seating was installed in the first three rows of the cabin. These could be converted from three seats in economy configuration to two seats for premium economy. The premium product offered priority check-in, larger baggage allowance, lounge access, priority boarding, increased legroom and all-inclusive in flight entertainment, meals and beverages on board. The product was aimed at business and corporate customers. The airline began charging economy-class passengers for checked baggage in September 2008. The airline further announced its intention to operate Airbus A330 aircraft between Perth and the East Coast, starting in May 2011.

In December 2010, Virgin Blue entered into alliances with Etihad Airways and Air New Zealand for code-sharing, reciprocal lounge and frequent flyer access and other co-operational projects. Virgin Blue also entered into talks with Delta Air Lines about the possibility of joining SkyTeam, one of the top three alliances in the world, as V Australia and Delta sought approval for an agreement between the two airlines to co-operate on trans-Pacific services. The agreement was rejected by the United States Department of Transportation under United States antitrust law. Upon review the agreement was approved by the United States Department of Transportation on 10 June 2011.

On 20 January 2011, Air New Zealand announced it would take a shareholding stake of between 10% and 14.99% in Virgin Blue. Air New Zealand chief executive Rob Fyfe described the investment "as part of Air New Zealand's strategy to develop scale and reach in this region" but said the airline had no intention of making a full takeover.

=== Launch of V Australia (2008–2011) ===
In early 2006, Virgin Blue announced its intention to operate up to seven flights a week to the U.S. through either Los Angeles or San Francisco. At the time, only Qantas and United Airlines competed in the Australia-US transpacific market. The airline was given permission for ten flights a week to the U.S. by Australian regulators on 24 July 2007. The plans were approved by US regulators on 15 February 2008, due to the signing of an open skies agreement between Australia and the US. Instead of using its existing brand, Virgin Blue launched a fully owned subsidiary with a separate Air Operator's Certificate, named V Australia as the result of a public naming competition, with a fleet of five specifically branded 777-300ERs.

The airline launched flights between Sydney and Los Angeles in 2009, followed by flights from Melbourne and Brisbane after obtaining permission to operate an unlimited number of flights between Australia and the U.S. by the Australian International Air Services Commission. V Australia also applied to the United States Department of Transportation to operate services to San Francisco, Seattle, Las Vegas, and New York, but these plans never materialised. V Australia later launched flights to Nadi International Airport, Phuket and Johannesburg (all of which were discontinued prior to the brand being absorbed into Virgin Australia, although Virgin Australia continued to operate to Phuket until 2015, and to Nadi), and Abu Dhabi to consolidate Virgin Blue's codeshare agreement with Etihad Airways.

=== Reorganisation and rebranding (2011–2019) ===
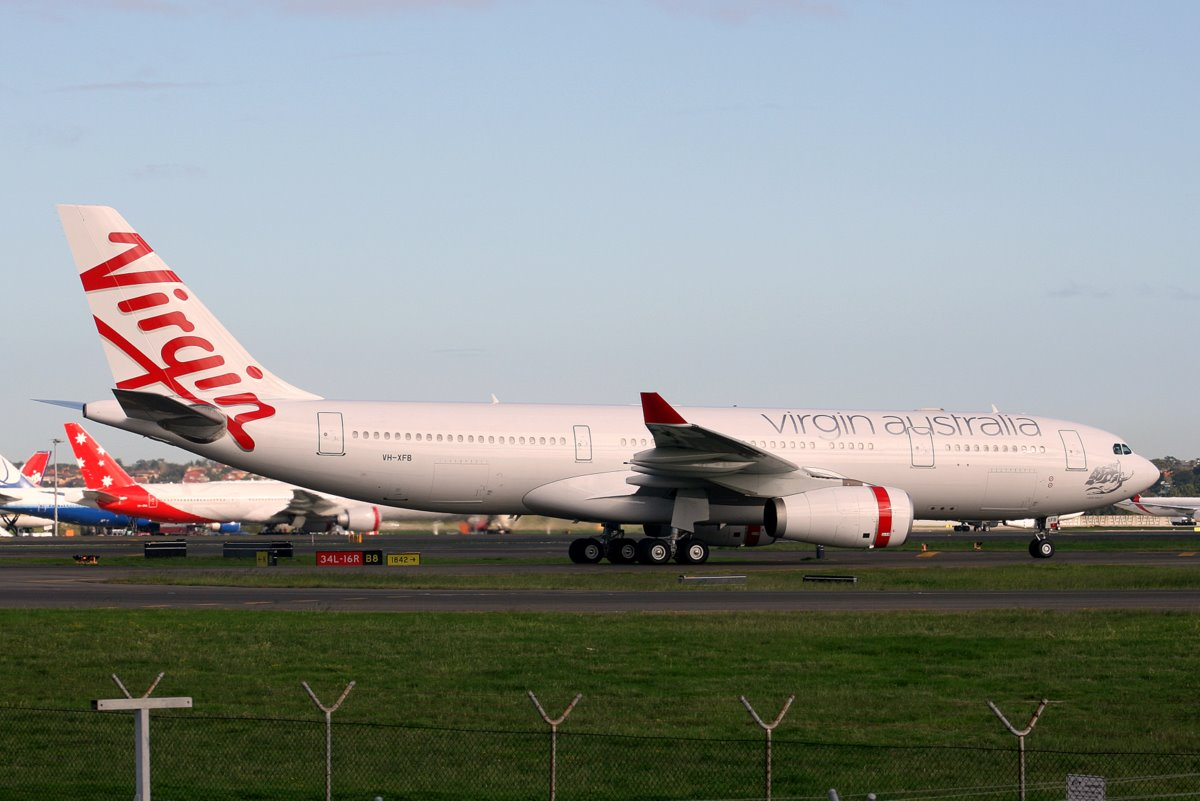
Airbus A330-200 Cable Beach arrives at Sydney Airport in the new Virgin Australia livery, 4 May 2011. A Boeing 777-300ER of sister airline V Australia is in the background.

On 7 May 2010, Brett Godfrey officially stepped down as Virgin Blue CEO after steering the company through its first 10 years. John Borghetti, former Qantas executive general manager, took over as the new Chief Executive. Following Borghetti's arrival as CEO, a number of key Qantas staff moved to Virgin Blue while key Virgin Blue staff departed the airline, causing much speculation regarding a forthcoming rebrand or reorganisation of the airline. In February 2011, the re-brand was confirmed when the airline announced that the word 'Blue' would be dropped from its name as part of a campaign to attract more business travellers away from rival Qantas. This came shortly after the unveiling of new crew uniforms and business-class seats. The airline stated that the re-brand would proceed in stages and would reportedly include a new fleet livery and the renaming of the other Virgin Blue Group airlines as well.

On 4 May 2011, the former Virgin Blue revealed its new name, Virgin Australia, as well as its new livery. In addition to the new name, branding and livery, the airline also showed off its new flagship, the Airbus A330, with new domestic business class. Boeing 737 business class seating was also revealed, to be introduced on all of Virgin's jet aircraft by the end of 2011. Pacific Blue and V Australia were both folded into the new Virgin Australia brand, following an agreement with former Virgin Atlantic shareholder Singapore Airlines, which ever since the establishment of Virgin Blue in 2000 had previously prohibited use of the Virgin brand outside Australia.

Early in 2011, it was announced that Virgin Blue had signed a ten-year deal with Perth-based regional airline Skywest Airlines, for Skywest to operate up to 18 ATR-72 turboprop aircraft leased by Virgin, in order to better compete in east coast regional markets served by QantasLink and Regional Express Airlines. The turboprops would supplement the existing Embraer E190s and replace the E170s, which would be phased out due to their being uneconomical on the routes operated by Virgin.

In October 2011, the Australian Competition & Consumer Commission (ACCC) approved a proposed code-share alliance between Singapore Airlines and Virgin Australia, subject to other regulatory approvals in both countries.

On 31 May 2016, Chinese aviation holding company HNA Group agreed to purchase 13% of Virgin Australia Holdings for A$159 million, subject to authorisation from the ACCC, a stake which HNA Group ultimately intended to increase to 19.99%. The deal also created a codeshare partnership between Virgin Australia and Chinese airlines in which HNA Group held shares, on routes between Australia and China. Virgin intended to launch flights between Australian destinations and Beijing and Hong Kong by 2017 to consolidate the agreement.

By October 2016, Air New Zealand sold its remaining 2.5 percent stake for A$65.7 million to investors including the Nanshan Group. On 4 April 2018, Air New Zealand announced the end of the code- and revenue-sharing partnership with Virgin Australia, effective 28 October 2018.

On 12 June 2018, Virgin Australia CEO John Borghetti confirmed that he would leave the airline before the end of his contract in January 2020. Borghetti, who became CEO in May 2010, mentioned that his initial plans were to stay in the position for three to four years, however, the company's growth and success prompted him to stay on. In February 2019 Paul Scurrah was announced as Borghetti's successor, with Scurrah commencing as CEO on 25 March 2019.

On 2 July 2018, Virgin Australia launched a Sydney to Hong Kong service. It ceased on 2 March 2020 due to the COVID-19 pandemic.

=== COVID-19 impact and administration (2020) ===
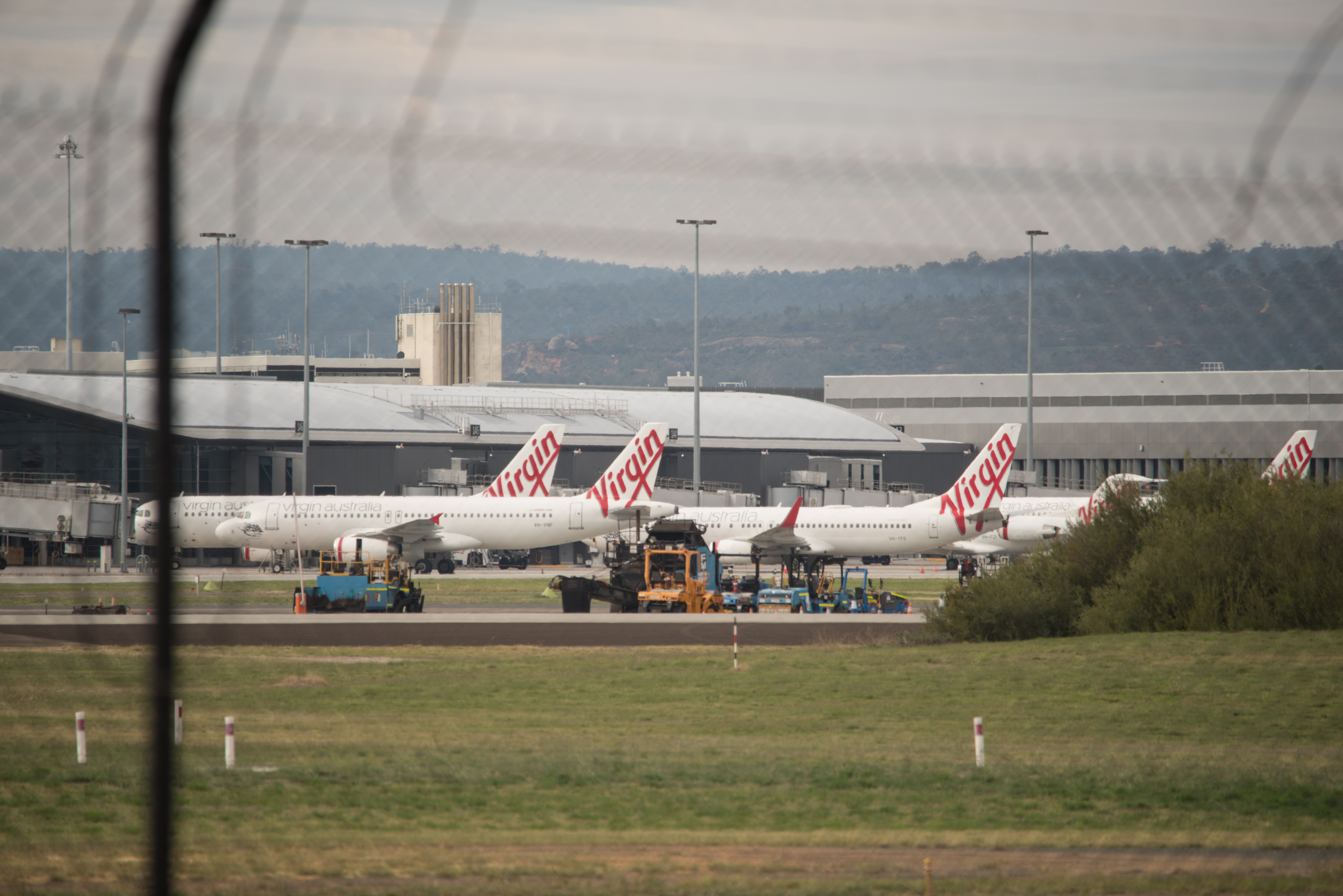
Virgin Australia aircraft parked at Perth Airport. After it entered voluntary administration in 2020, Virgin planes were temporarily seized by Perth Airport.

On 18 March 2020, Virgin Australia CEO Paul Scurrah announced the grounding of the equivalent of 53 planes due to the ongoing COVID-19 pandemic, effective 30 March. This had the effect of temporarily returning Virgin Australia to being a domestic-only airline.

On 31 March 2020, Virgin Australia confirmed it had asked the Federal Government for a $1.4 billion loan to help it through the COVID-19 crisis. The airline said its bailout proposal was "subject to approval by the Virgin Australia Holdings board and the Australian Government" and "may or may not include conversion to equity in certain circumstances." Qantas responded by noting its revenue was three times higher than Virgin's, meaning that if Virgin was bailed-out, they should be given a $4.2 billion loan as to not distort the market.

On 4 April 2020, the Australian Government announced it would be subsidising a bare-bones international network operated by Qantas and Virgin Australia for four weeks in April. Virgin's began operating later that month to Hong Kong twice weekly and once weekly to Los Angeles. On the same day, it became known that Virgin Australia had decided to permanently shutter its New Zealand operation, resulting in 600 jobs in New Zealand to be lost.

On 9 April 2020, it was announced that all services, except one Melbourne-Sydney return flight six times a week, would be suspended from 10 April.

On 14 April 2020 Virgin Australia Holdings was granted a trading halt on the Australian Securities Exchange pending a company announcement or to start trading again on 16 April 2020.

On 16 April 2020, the Federal Government announced it would spend $160 million subsidising a minimum number of services operated by Virgin Australia and Qantas. The domestic minimal network announced is effective 17 April until 8 June 2020 and involves 64 flights weekly. It serves Brisbane, Sydney, Melbourne, Adelaide, Perth, regional WA and regional Queensland.

On 18 April 2020, the Queensland Government offered $200 million to help bail out Virgin Australia, however, the bailout had a number of conditions including Federal Government backing, debt restructuring, shareholders and bondholders contributing, headquarters remaining in Brisbane and ongoing regional flights.

On 21 April 2020, Virgin Australia confirmed it had gone into voluntary administration, citing its inability to continue operations without a Federal Government bailout. However, there are no changes being made to which flights are being operated.

Virgin Australia Holdings, Ltd. and 39 affiliated debtors filed Chapter 15 bankruptcy in the United States District Court for the Southern District of New York. The primary case is #20-11024.

=== Restructuring and post-pandemic period (2020–2025) ===
In June 2020, the airline was included in the purchase of Virgin Australia Holdings by Bain Capital.

In August 2020, Bain Capital announced the plan for a new 'Virgin Australia 2.0', signalling that the move was more focused towards streamlining and refocussing Virgin Australia, rather than a complete overhaul. The announcement included the immediate retirement of the remaining ATR, Airbus A330 and 777 fleets, in addition to the retirement of the Tigerair brand.

On 15 October 2020, as a result of numerous restructuring measures by Bain Capital, Virgin Australia CEO Paul Scurrah announced that he would resign. Jayne Hrdlicka was announced as Scurrah's successor, with Hrdlicka commencing as CEO on 18 November 2020.

On 15 December 2021, Virgin Australia and United Airlines announced a new partnership beginning in April 2022. This brought an end to the Delta Air Lines partnership after over a decade.

In September 2023, it was reported that Virgin Australia had been affected by the false-certification scandal plaguing London-based AOG Technics, with two Boeing 737-800s temporarily put out of service after the airline became aware that the engines had been fitted with unauthorised parts. VH-VUT was fitted with an unauthorised low-pressure turbine blade, whilst VH-YFR was fitted with an unauthorised seal for an inner high-pressure turbine nozzle.

On 10 October 2023, Virgin Australia announced it had returned to profitability for the first time in eleven years, reporting a profit of $129 million. Revenue more than doubled compared to the prior year to $5 billion as the company responded strongly to increased customer demand following COVID-19.

On 1 May 2024, the Australian Competition & Consumer Commission (ACCC) voted in favour of supporting a proposed agreement of reintroducing a codeshare agreement between Air New Zealand and Virgin Australia. In June 2024 this was granted formal approval. However, this codeshare is limited in scope to specific trans-Tasman routes into Auckland, Wellington and Christchurch.

In October 2024, Qatar Airways agreed terms to purchase a 25% stake in Virgin Australia. After receiving clearance by the ACCC and Foreign Investment Review Board, the deal was approved by the Treasurer of Australia in February 2025.

In February 2024, Jayne Hrdlicka announced her intention to resign as Virgin Australia's CEO. In March 2025, Virgin Australia announced that incumbent Chief Commercial Officer Dave Emerson, would replace Hrdlicka as CEO.

=== Relisting on the ASX (2025–present) ===
In preparation of relisting on the ASX, Peter Warne was appointed Chairman of Virgin Australia Holdings, replacing Ryan Cotton. The company relisted on the ASX in June 2025, with Bain Capital reducing its ownership to 40% and Qatar Airways to 23%.

From mid-October 2025, Virgin Australia is the first airline in Australia to allow small domesticated dogs and cats to travel in the cabin with their owners.

== Corporate affairs ==
=== Head office ===
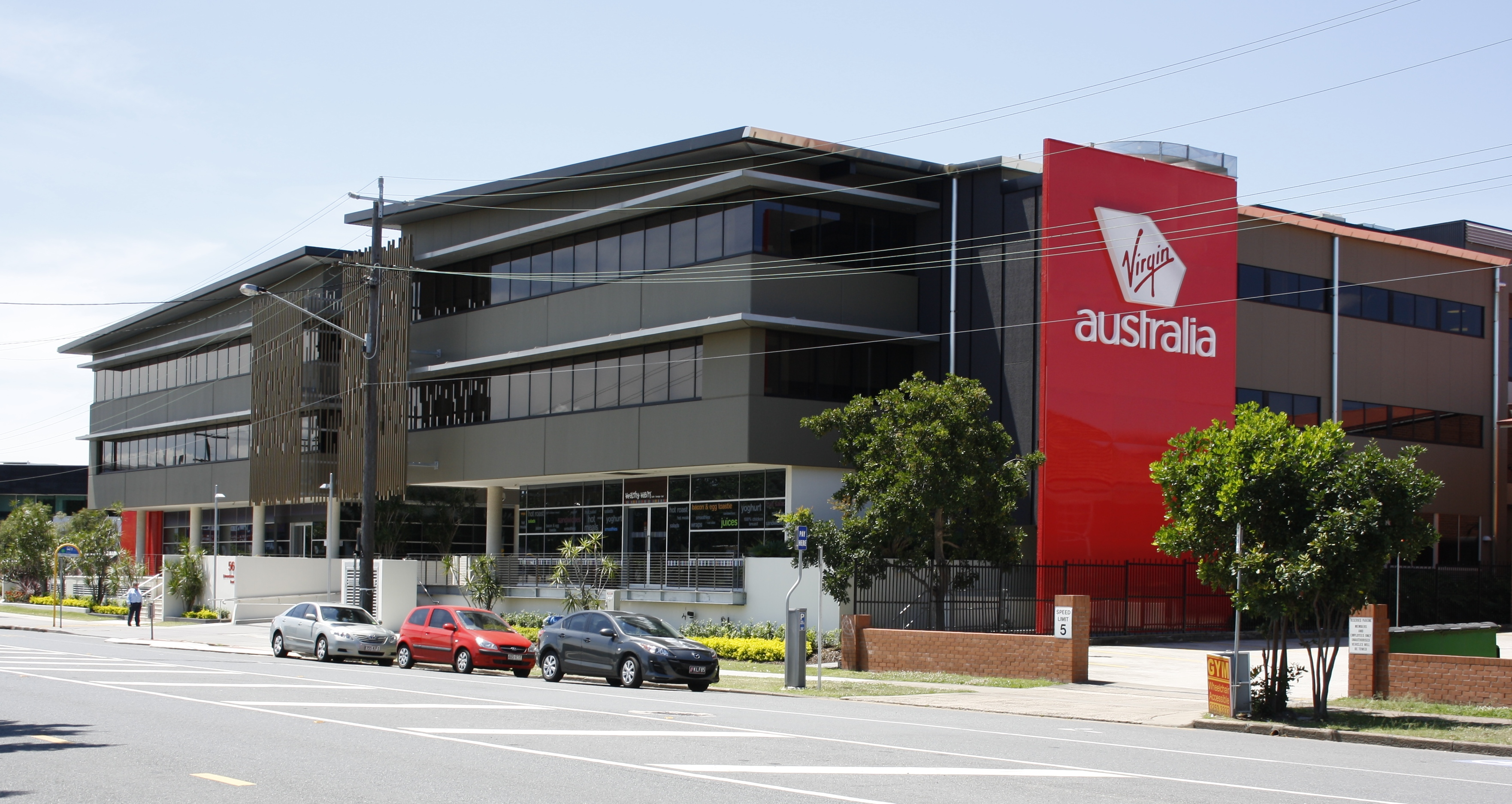
Virgin Village, the previous Virgin Australia head office in Bowen Hills, Brisbane

Until its move to South Bank in September 2020, Virgin Australia's head office was the Virgin Village in Bowen Hills, Brisbane. The building, with about 13,220 square metres (142,300 sq ft) A-Grade office space, was triple net leased to Virgin Blue.

As the airline started operations, it decided to place its head office in the Brisbane area (initially as Virgin Blue, at 112 Barry Parade in Fortitude Valley). Brett Godfrey, the airline co-founder and Chief Executive for 10 years, said in 2006 that the decision "was a long considered one and has worked well". The airline originally had its head office in Fortitude Valley, Brisbane. The airline purchased a $61 million site in Bowen Hills for its new head office. The firm Sunland Group, which had acquired the Bowen Hills site for $8 million in 2005, had scheduled to complete the new head office in March, and the airline would be ready to move into the new head office by August of the following year. The Virgin Village formally opened on 17 October 2008. As of 2008, 1,000 employees worked at Virgin Village.

=== Sister airlines ===
==== Former ====
===== Pacific Blue =====
In September 2003, Pacific Blue was set up to offer a low-cost service between New Zealand and Australia. Pacific Blue aimed to position itself as a low-cost competitor to Air New Zealand and Qantas on trans-Tasman routes. Pacific Blue also operated services on behalf of the Polynesian Blue joint-venture with the government of Samoa. Pacific Blue has since been rebranded under the Virgin Australia name and livery.

===== V Australia =====
In early 2006, Virgin Blue's parent company announced its intention to operate up to seven flights a week to the United States using either Los Angeles International Airport or San Francisco International Airport, saying that the route was needed to make the airline as profitable as possible. On 25 July 2007, it was announced that "V Australia" would be the name of the new carrier.

===== Tigerair Australia =====
On 30 October 2012, Virgin Australia Holdings announced it had purchased a 60% stake in Tiger Airways Australia for $35 million. Tiger was planned to be continued to operate as a low cost subsidiary for 20 years. In October 2014, Virgin took full control of Tigerair for one dollar. After Bain Capital acquired Virgin Australia, in 2020, Tiger was suspended and then later officially discontinued by Bain Capital.

==== Current ====
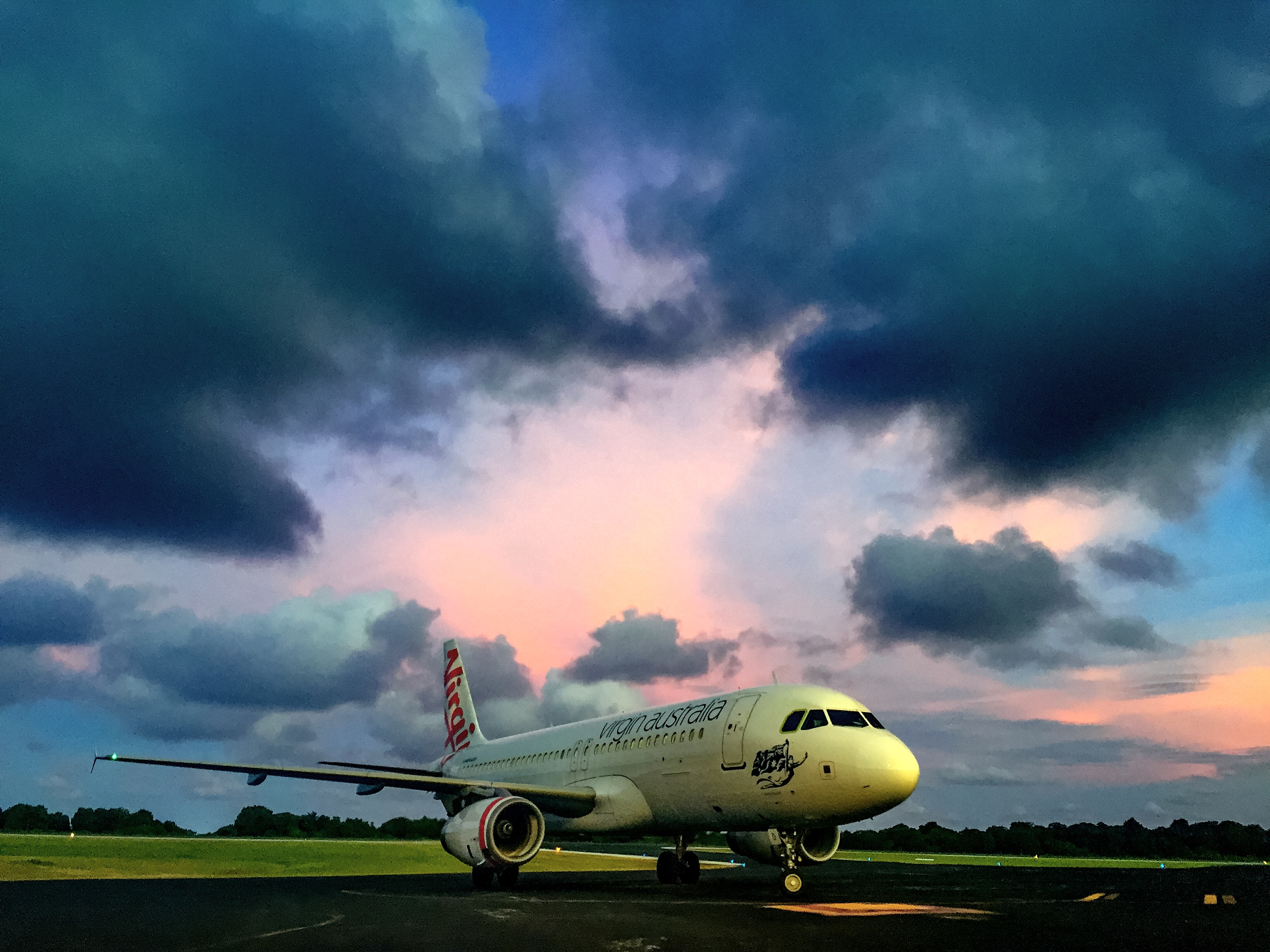
Virgin Australia Regional Airlines Airbus A320 (VH-YUD) at Christmas Island Airport (2016)

===== Virgin Australia Regional Airlines =====
On 11 April 2013, Virgin Australia Holdings completed its acquisition of regional airline Skywest Airlines. Skywest was then renamed Virgin Australia Regional Airlines.

=== Marketing and sponsorship ===
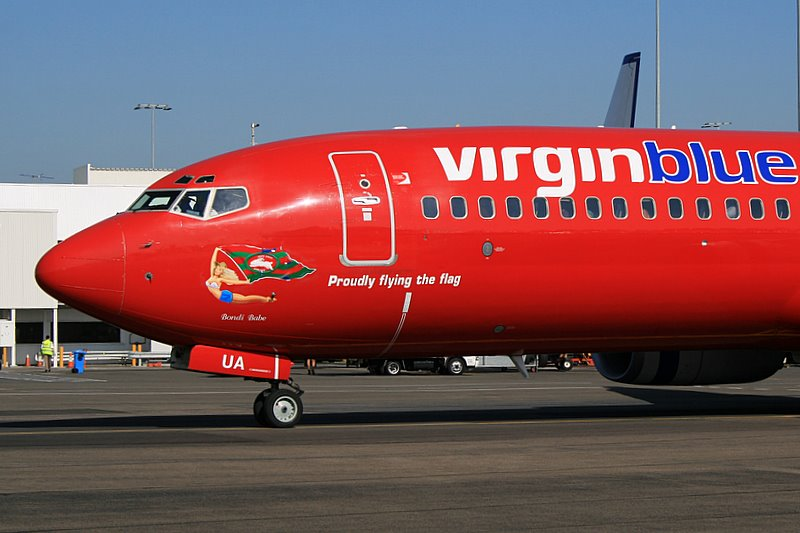
Virgin Blue's "Rabbitohs" Boeing 737 'Bondi Babe' at Sydney Airport

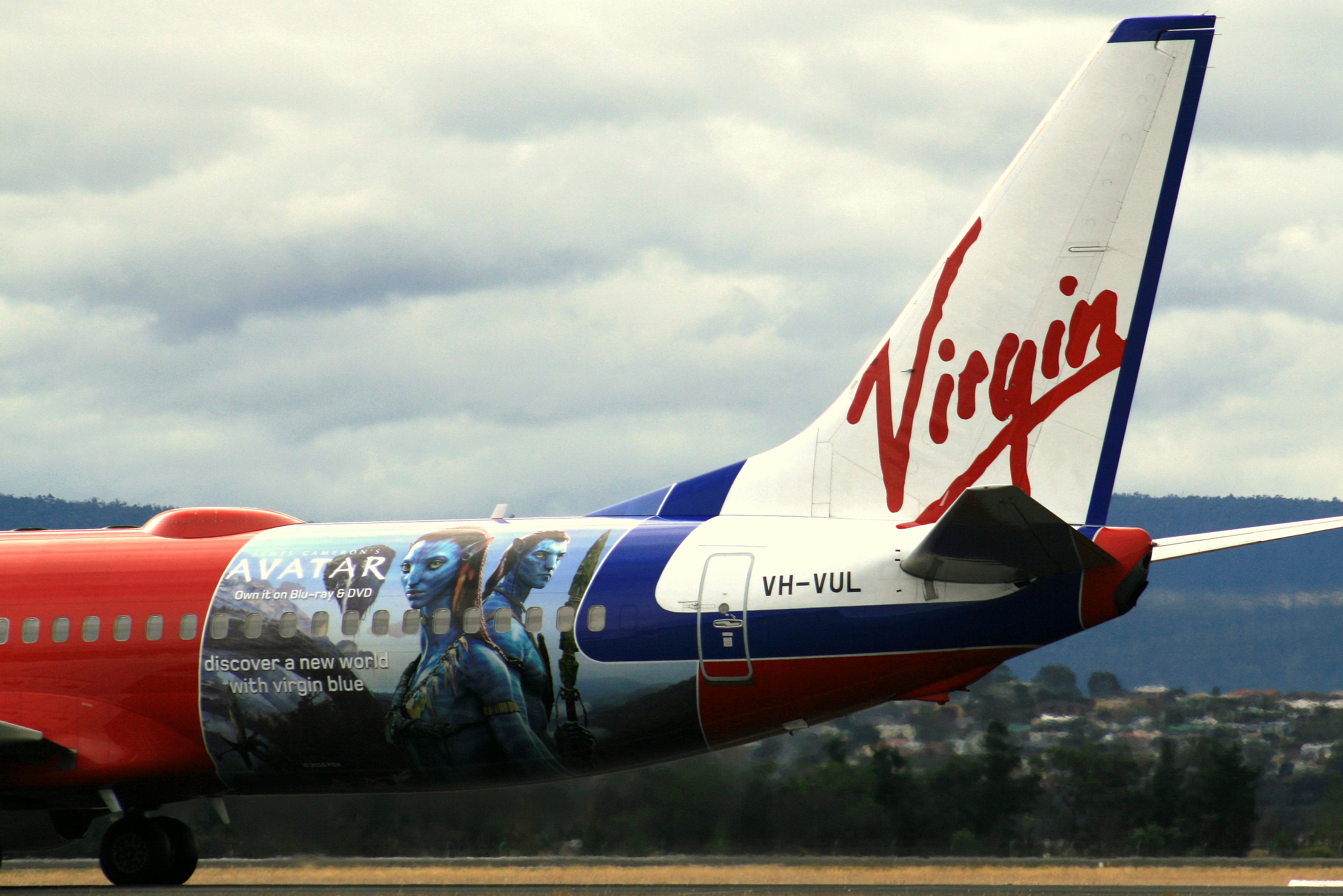
Virgin Blue Boeing 737 with special scheme to advertise the Australian DVD release of the movie Avatar

Since its inception, Virgin Blue had sponsored many sporting teams in a bid to promote its brand. In February 2007, Virgin Blue signed a two-year sponsorship deal with NRL team the South Sydney Rabbitohs. The Rabbitohs were the first rugby league team Virgin Australia sponsored. One of the airline's Boeing 737-800s had slight changes to its livery to commemorate this sponsorship; the Australian flag held by the "Virgin Girl" was replaced by the Rabbitohs' flag. Virgin Australia is also the official sponsor of the National Basketball League (NBL), and the title sponsor of NBL team the Brisbane Bullets.

In November 2010, the Australian Football League (AFL) decided not to renew its marketing contract with Qantas, instead choosing Virgin Blue for a deal worth A$5–8 million.

Virgin Blue gained extra revenue (and publicity) by painting two aircraft as "flying billboards". One promoted a brand of men's razor, the other a Queensland Government campaign to attract businesses to the state. Both aircraft have since been withdrawn from the Virgin Blue fleet.

In 2007, Virgin Blue introduced an advertising campaign with the slogan "Get What You Want", named after the song by Queensland band Operator Please that featured in its TV advertisements. In 2009, Virgin Blue introduced an all new advertising campaign entitled "Now there's an idea". TV Commercials showing comparisons between flying in Australia in 1999 as opposed to 2009 were screened, to the tune a song by The Cat Empire. New billboard advertising was launched, showcasing Virgin Blue's variety of products and on-time performance records.

In 2011, with the airline's rebranding as Virgin Australia, the airline's slogan was changed to "Now you're flying".

Virgin Australia became a sponsor of the newest AFL clubs, the Gold Coast Suns and Greater Western Sydney Giants, in 2011 and 2014 respectively. Virgin Australia also appear as a sponsor on the guernseys of the Carlton Football Club since June 2017 initially due to the loss of a sponsor of the club, but Carlton announced in August 2017 that the partnership will be extended until the end of the 2022 AFL season. In 2016, the airline reached an agreement with V8 Supercars to rename the annual motorsport series to the Virgin Australia Supercars Championship starting 1 July.

To coincide with the release of Disney Pixar's Toy Story 5 in 2026, Virgin Australia co-branded the fuselage of one of its Boeing 737-800 aircraft (VH-YFY) to feature the characters from the upcoming movie. This corporate sponsorship was the first the airline had participated in for almost a decade.

=== Awards ===
The airline has won a number of awards since its inception. It and certain of its employees won five 2009 service excellence awards of the Customer Service Institute of Australia. Since being named as best low-cost airline in the Asia/Pacific region in the Skytrax 2002 Airline of the Year Survey, the airline has been voted best airline in a number of different categories and by a number of different organisations.

As an employer, Virgin Australia was recognised as the most attractive employer in Australia in 2015 at the annual Randstad Award. It also placed in the top 3 for the previous five years, including a top spot in 2011.

The airline's frequent flyer program, Velocity Rewards (now Velocity Frequent Flyer), won the 2009 Freddie Awards for best frequent flyer program, best award redemption, best affinity credit card, best member communications and best website. This was the fourth consecutive Freddie Awards that Velocity won.

Velocity Frequent Flyer won the 2018 Freddie Awards for program of the year, best elite program, best customer service, and best redemption ability. This was the sixth consecutive year that Velocity won the best redemption ability award.

== Destinations ==
On 11 December 2024, Qatar Airways announced that passengers can begin booking air tickets for direct routes to Doha from Sydney, Brisbane and Perth on behalf of Virgin Australia for travels commencing June 2025 onwards. This collaboration will also see Melbourne to be added in the mix later the same year.

=== Joint venture ===
Virgin Australia has joint venture agreements with the following airlines:

- Qatar Airways
- Singapore Airlines

=== Codeshare agreements ===
Virgin Australia has codeshare agreements with the following airlines:

- Air Canada
- Air India
- Air Mauritius
- Air New Zealand
- All Nippon Airways
- China Southern Airlines
- Link Airways
- Qatar Airways
- Singapore Airlines
- South African Airways
- United Airlines
- Virgin Atlantic

=== Interline agreements ===
Virgin Australia has interlining agreements with the following airlines:

- Air Canada
- Aircalin
- EVA Air
- Hainan Airlines
- Hong Kong Airlines
- Pakistan International Airlines
- Scoot
- SriLankan Airlines
- Swiss International Air Lines
- Trinity Airways
- WestJet
- XiamenAir

== Fleet ==
=== Current fleet ===
As of October 2026, Virgin Australia operates an all-Boeing 737 fleet composed of the following aircraft; this list excludes Embraer E190-E2 aircraft operated by Virgin Australia Regional Airlines.

Virgin Australia fleet
| Aircraft | In service | Orders | Passengers | | | Notes |
| Aircraft | In service | Orders | J | Y | Total | Notes |
|---|---|---|---|---|---|---|
| Boeing 737-700 | 9 | — | 8 | 126 | 134 | 7 aircraft acquired from KLM. |
| Boeing 737-800 | 74 | — | 8 | 174 | 182 | Retrofitted to 182 seat configuration. |
| Boeing 737 MAX 8 | 26 | — | 8 | 174 | 182 | Deliveries began in June 2023. |
| Boeing 737 MAX 10 | — | 10 | 8 | 196 | 204 | Deliveries expected from late 2027. 12 orders converted to Boeing 737 MAX 8. |
| Total | 109 | 10 | | | | |

Initially, Virgin Australia leased its aircraft, but recent additions to the fleet have been purchased outright. Virgin Australia-owned Boeing 737s are indicated by the Boeing customer code FE in the model suffix. The former 777 fleet owned by V Australia are indicated by ZG in the model suffix. In order to conserve capital, Virgin Australia has started accepting second hand aircraft into their fleet, like the Boeing 737–700s from KLM to replace the ageing Fokker 100s.

On 28 June 2023, Virgin Australia took delivery its first 737 MAX 8, becoming the second Australian operator of the type. (Note: After Bonza.) After limited domestic operations, Virgin Australia deployed the plane onto the Cairns–Tokyo Haneda route in late July 2023.

On 13 September 2024, Virgin Australia announced that 12 orders would be switched from the Boeing 737 MAX 10 to the MAX 8 due to continuing supply chain delays.

=== Former fleet ===
The airline has removed the following aircraft types from passenger service:

Virgin Australia former fleet
| Aircraft | Total | Delivered | Exit date | Notes |
|---|---|---|---|---|
| Airbus A330-200 | 8 | 2011 | 2020 | 2 transferred to Azul Brazilian Airlines. |
| Boeing 737-300 | 1 | 2001 | 2004 | |
| Boeing 737-400 | 6 | 2000 | 2003 | |
| Boeing 777-300ER | 5 | 2011 | 2020 | Former V Australia fleet. Retired early due to the COVID-19 pandemic. First and only Boeing 777 passenger aircraft operator in Australia. 3 transferred to Qatar Airways. |
| Embraer E170 | 4 | 2007 | 2012 | Transferred to Compass Airlines. |
| Embraer E190AR | 18 | 2008 | 2018 | |

=== Fleet development ===
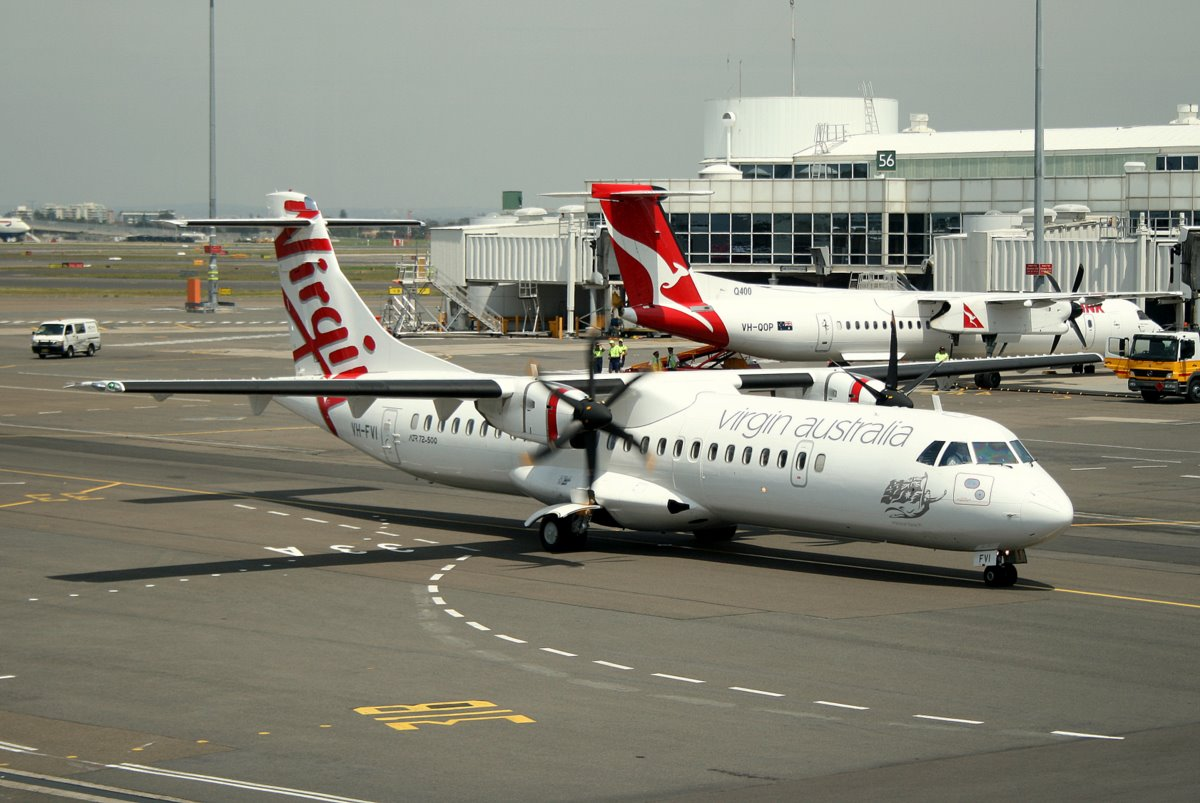
A former Virgin Australia ATR 72, Mission Beach

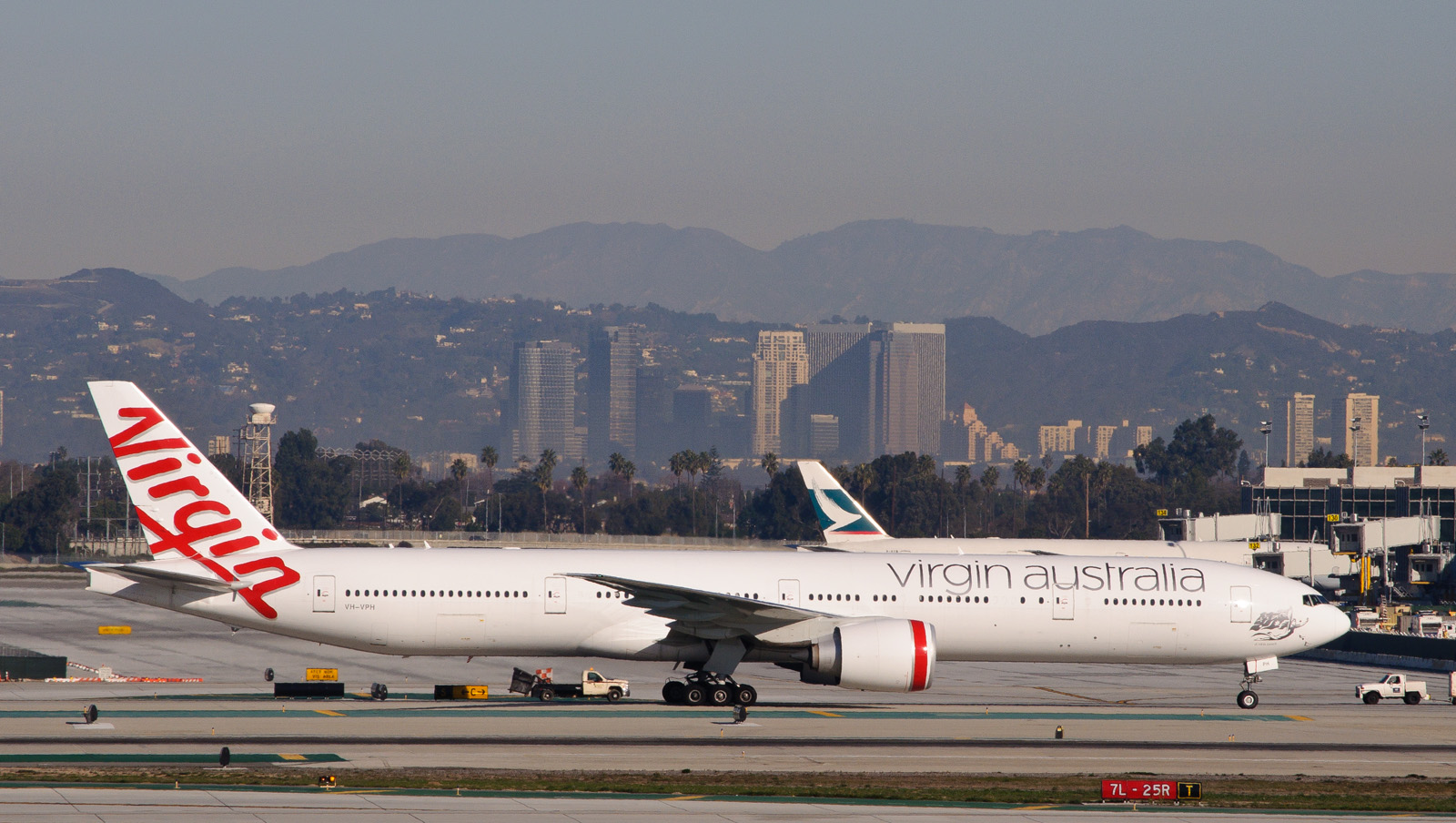
A former Boeing 777-300ER at Los Angeles International Airport

In November 2006, Virgin Blue announced plans to purchase eleven Embraer E190 and three Embraer E170 aircraft with options for six more E-jets, which later became orders for an additional three E170s and three E190s. In February 2008, a further four E190 aircraft were ordered, leaving six options and ten purchase rights. Virgin Blue received its first Embraer E170 in early September 2007 at a special ceremony at the Embraer plant in Sao Jose dos Campos. A revised logo was introduced on the tail, bringing the Virgin Blue brand into line with the logos of other Virgin-branded companies.

Like Virgin Atlantic, Virgin Australia gives the aircraft in its fleet names, previously incorporating female names and words connected with Australian cities and localities or other quintessentially Australian themes. Recent additions to the fleet have featured names of famous Australian beaches. Names on Virgin Australia aircraft include 'Brissie Lizzie' ("Brissie" being an Australian slang name for Brisbane, and "Lizzie" being slang for Elizabeth), 'Sassy Sydney' (Sydney is a female name as well as the name of one of Australia's largest cities), 'Prue Blue' (incorporating the name Prudence and also a pun on the Australian phrase "true blue", meaning "patriotic"), 'Tassie Tigress' (incorporating both the slang name for Tasmania and the common name for the thylacine) and 'Mackay-be Diva' (a pun on the city of Mackay, Queensland and Makybe Diva, a famous Australian racehorse). Beaches which have aircraft named after them include Cable Beach, Cottesloe Beach and Bondi Beach. Each aircraft in the Virgin Australia livery (some were painted in Pacific Blue livery for cross-promotional reasons) also features a "virgin girl" as nose art, complete with a wide-brimmed Aussie hat, trailing an Australian flag.

On 24 October 2007, Virgin Australia announced the introduction of premium economy on all domestic flights.

Virgin Australia began long haul international operations as V Australia, commencing its first passenger flight operations on 27 February 2009. V Australia was folded back into Virgin on 7 December 2011.

On 10 January 2011, Virgin Blue entered a 10-year strategic alliance with Perth-based Skywest Airlines (which would later be purchased and rebranded as Virgin Australia Regional Airlines) to operate up to 18 new Virgin-branded turboprop aircraft from mid-2011. On 23 February, it was announced that the aircraft would be ATR 72s, to enter service beginning in May 2011; they would allow Virgin Australia to both replace its fleet of Embraer E170s and introduce new regional routes. The turboprops would be operated by Skywest Airlines under a wet lease agreement. The May in-service date was not met, and in late July the first announcement was made concerning routes to be served. It was reported that the ATR-72s would be initially employed on services between Brisbane and Gladstone, Queensland; from Brisbane and Sydney to Port Macquarie in New South Wales; and on additional services between Sydney and Canberra.

On 25 January 2012, Virgin Australia announced additional services between Brisbane, Proserpine, Rockhampton and Cairns. It wet leased two Fokker 100s from Alliance Airlines to operate these services. On 26 February 2013, Virgin Australia announced it would start flights between Brisbane and Bundaberg on 4 May 2013.

=== Orders ===
An agreement was signed with Boeing on 1 April 2010 for a firm order of fifty Boeing 737–800 aircraft, with flexibility to convert to either the smaller Boeing 737–700s or the larger Boeing 737–900ERs; as well as 25 additional options and 30 future purchase rights. Deliveries were scheduled to be completed in 2017. In July 2012, Virgin Australia announced an order for 23 Boeing 737 MAX 8 aircraft, with deliveries planned between 2019 and 2021. Virgin converted its outstanding order for 17 Boeing 737-800 aircraft to the MAX model in 2015, bringing the total order for this type to 40 aircraft. In August 2018, Virgin converted 10 of its 737 MAX 8 orders for the larger MAX 10 variant. Deliveries of the MAX 10 were to begin in 2022. In April 2019, the airline deferred deliveries and converted 15 MAX 8 orders to the larger MAX 10 variant. Deliveries of the MAX 10 were scheduled to start in 2021, while MAX 8's are not expected until 2025, however, due to worldwide groundings and suspensions of deliveries and production of the 737 MAX aircraft temporarily stopped following two fatal crashes, deliveries are likely to be delayed. In December 2020, Virgin cancelled orders for the MAX 8 and revised its order to just 25 MAX 10s with the planned delivery date deferred to mid-2023.

However, in April 2022, CEO Jayne Hrdlicka announced the company had reversed the cancellation of the MAX 8 order with 'at least' four (later rising to 8) MAX 8 jets arriving by February 2023. This announcement was made in conjunction with efforts to replace the older Fokker 100 craft in the Virgin Australian Regional Airlines fleet. With delays in certifying the 737 MAX 10 being experienced by Boeing, it is not likely Virgin Australia would see its first MAX 10 until early 2025. Furthermore, due to these delays, Virgin Australia was believed to be assessing options to swap the MAX 10 orders for MAX 8 models. At the same time as receiving its third MAX 8 into service, Virgin Australia announced an increase in the MAX 8 order from 8 to 14 total air frames.

=== Cargo ===
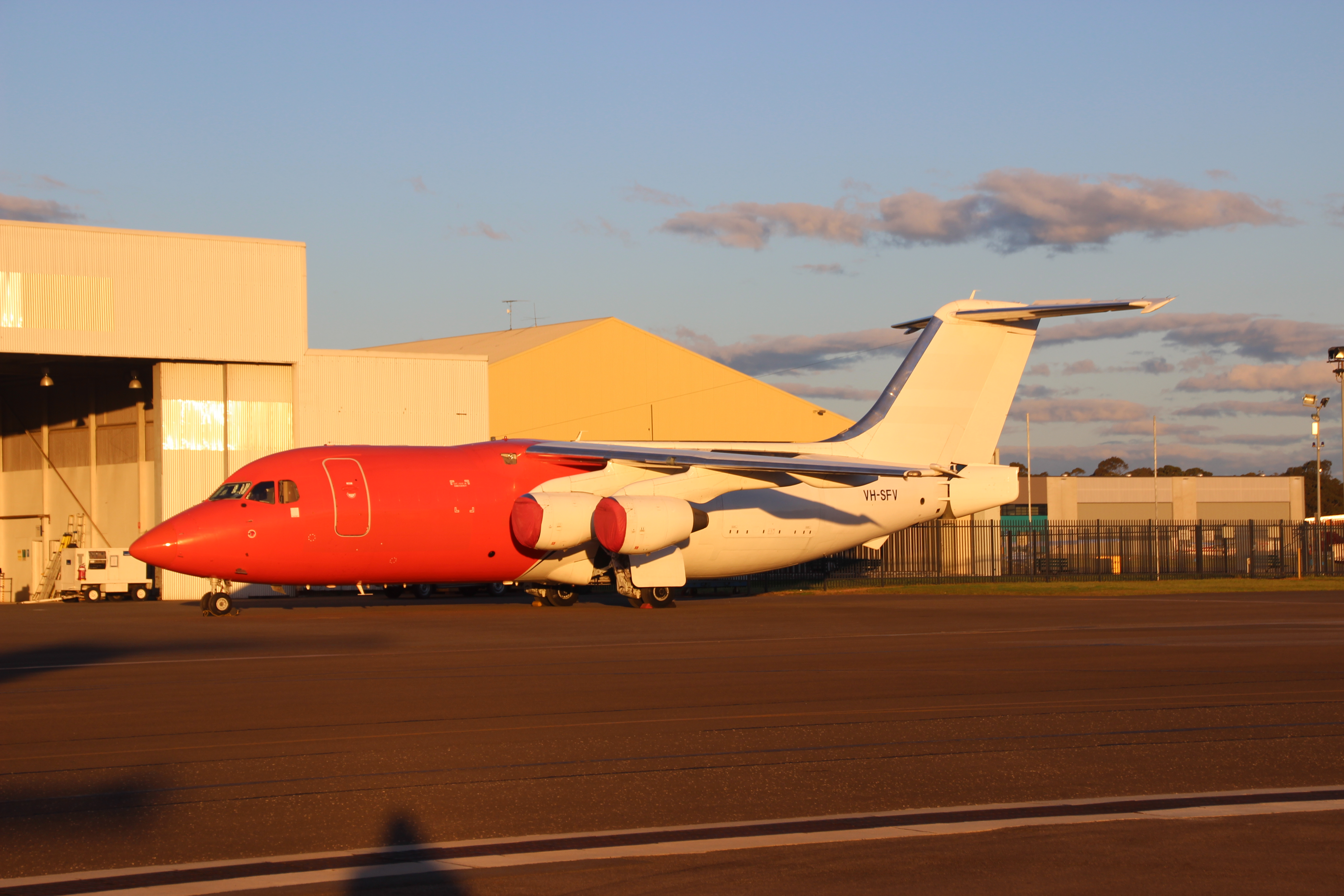
One of ASL Airlines' British Aerospace 146 cargo freighters that formerly operated for Virgin Australia

Virgin Australia Cargo was launched in July 2015 after the airline's contract to carry freight on behalf of Toll expired and was not renewed. The airline signed a five-year carriage contract with TNT in 2016 and operations of dedicated freighter aircraft commenced on 4 July the same year. Between 2016 and 2020, ASL Australia (formally Pionair) operated three BAe 146–200 aircraft and Airwork operated 1 Boeing 737–300F on a wet-lease contract for the company. Since Virgin Australia went into voluntary administration in March 2020, contracts with both companies appear to be discontinued, as the aircraft are now flying for other companies around Australia and New Zealand. The Virgin Australia Cargo brand still exists, however, but with freight placed in the hold of its passenger aircraft.

== Cabin ==
=== Domestic and short-haul international operations ===
==== Business ====
Virgin Australia offers a business class service on most of its jet aircraft. The seat pitch is 95 cm (37 in) on its Boeing 737–800.

==== Economy X ====
Economy X offers a more premium experience at the airport and on board, within the affordability of Economy class. Economy X includes extra legroom, Preferred overhead locker space (Virgin Australia operated flights only), Priority boarding (where available) & Priority screening (where available).

==== Economy ====
Economy class seats offer 80 cm (31 in) seat pitch. Selected Boeing 737 aircraft have wireless in-flight entertainment.

== In-flight amenities ==
=== Food and beverages ===
Virgin Australia offers business class passengers a full three-course meal prepared on board by the crew.

The business class food menu is accompanied by a premium range of Australian wines, beers and spirits and non-alcoholic beverages.

In Economy Class, the airline offers a buy on board food and drink service and serves complimentary tea, coffee and water to all passengers on all domestic and short haul international Virgin Australia flights.

=== In-flight entertainment ===
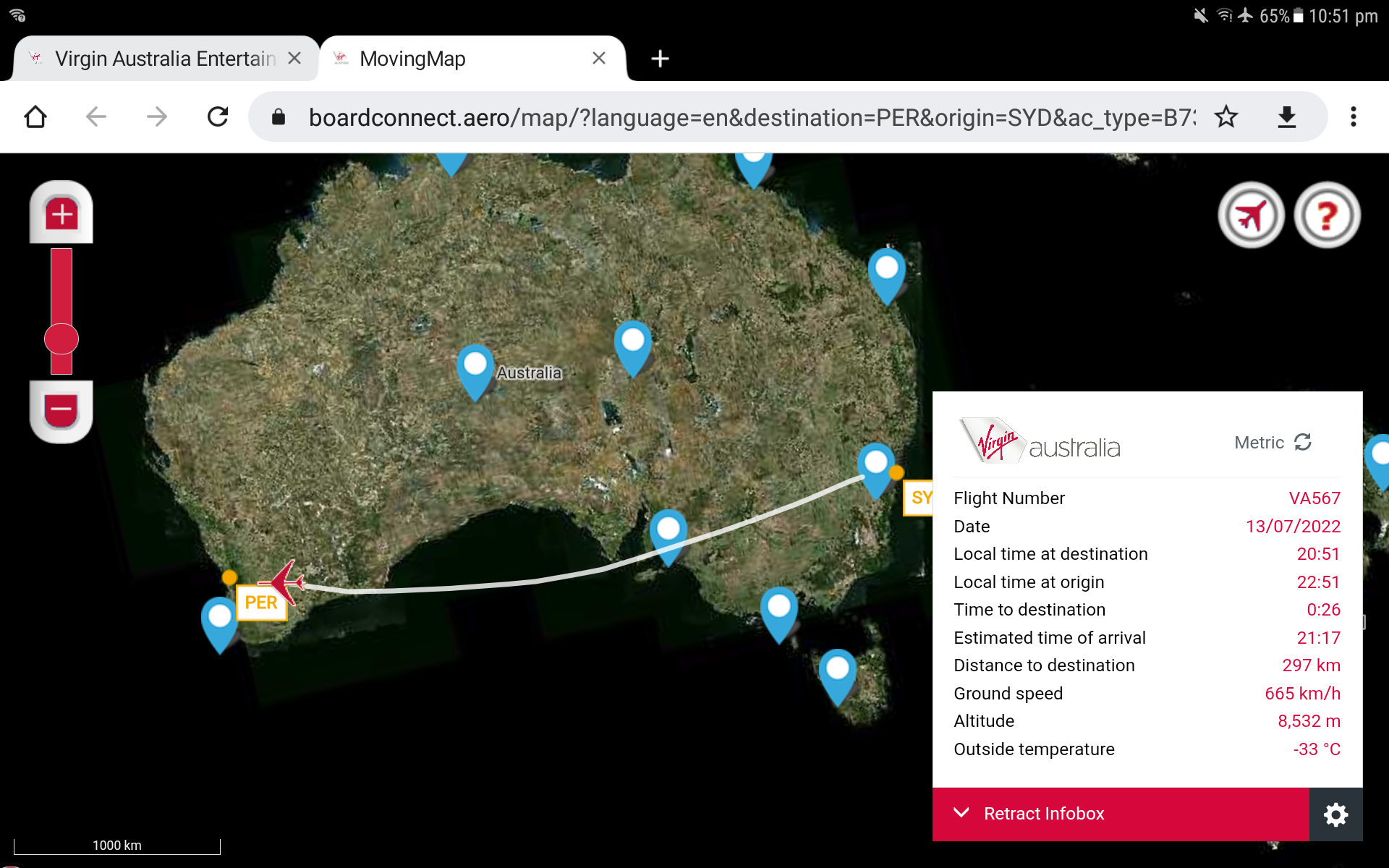
Virgin Australia's moving map showcasing a flight path from Sydney to Perth

In December 2006, Virgin Australia (as Virgin Blue) announced a partnership between Australian cable television providers Foxtel and Austar, to introduce a "Live2Air" service on most flights by mid-2007. The Live2Air system was only available on select Boeing 737 aircraft, and was phased out beginning in 2012.

Virgin Australia's Boeing 777-300ERs and Airbus A330-200 aircraft's in-flight entertainment RED was based on the Panasonic eX2 system. RED was fully touch-screen and handset controlled. There was no fee for use. RED featured an extensive video on demand library that includes new release film, TV series and TV programmes. Destination guides were available. Other functions available through RED included music on demand (approx 200+ CD library) and video games. Seat-to-seat chat was available as well as in flight map and flight information.

In December 2012, Virgin Australia introduced an in-flight Wi-Fi system to provide music, movies and TV shows to tablets, smartphones, laptops and similar devices. The system, which does not offer internet access, is estimated to be fitted on all the airline's planes within 2 years.

In 2018, Virgin Australia began upgrading the in-flight Wi-Fi system in order to offer wireless internet access. The Boeing 777 fleet was expected to be rolled out by the end of 2018, while the Boeing 737 and Airbus A330 fleets are expected to complete rollout of internet access by the end of 2019. The regional fleets of Airbus A320s, ATR 72-600s and Fokker 100s will not be rolled out with internet Wi-Fi access.

After the Virgin Australia take-over by Bain Capital, they removed access to their in-flight Wi-Fi system. According to the ABC "Virgin Australia is reviewing its in-flight offerings and services including Wi-Fi and entertainment" under the leadership of newly appointed CEO Jayne Hrdlicka, leaving Qantas to be the only Australian carrier to offer in-flight Wi-Fi.

Virgin Australia has begun offering Wi-Fi and stream-to-your-device entertainment on all 737 MAX and equipped 737-800 aircraft. Entertainment options include movies and TV shows, as well as podcasts and books, along with a basic inflight map once connected to the inflight network. Connections to the internet is charged for all passengers other than Velocity Platinum and Business Class guests, who receive complimentary access.

=== Pets in Cabin ===
From mid-October 2025, Virgin Australia is the first airline in Australia to allow small domesticated dogs and cats to travel in the cabin with their owners. Initially, pets are to be allocated in dedicated seats, and be able to fit in padded cages under the seat in front of their owners, and a cap of four pets per aircraft apply. Flights offering pets in cabin are initially only available between the following destinations;

- Melbourne (Tullamarine) - Sunshine Coast (Maroochydore)
- Melbourne (Tullamarine) - Gold Coast (Coolangatta)

From June 2026, Adelaide was added as a destination allowing Pets in Cabin flights, to the airports that already allow the service.

== Lounge service ==
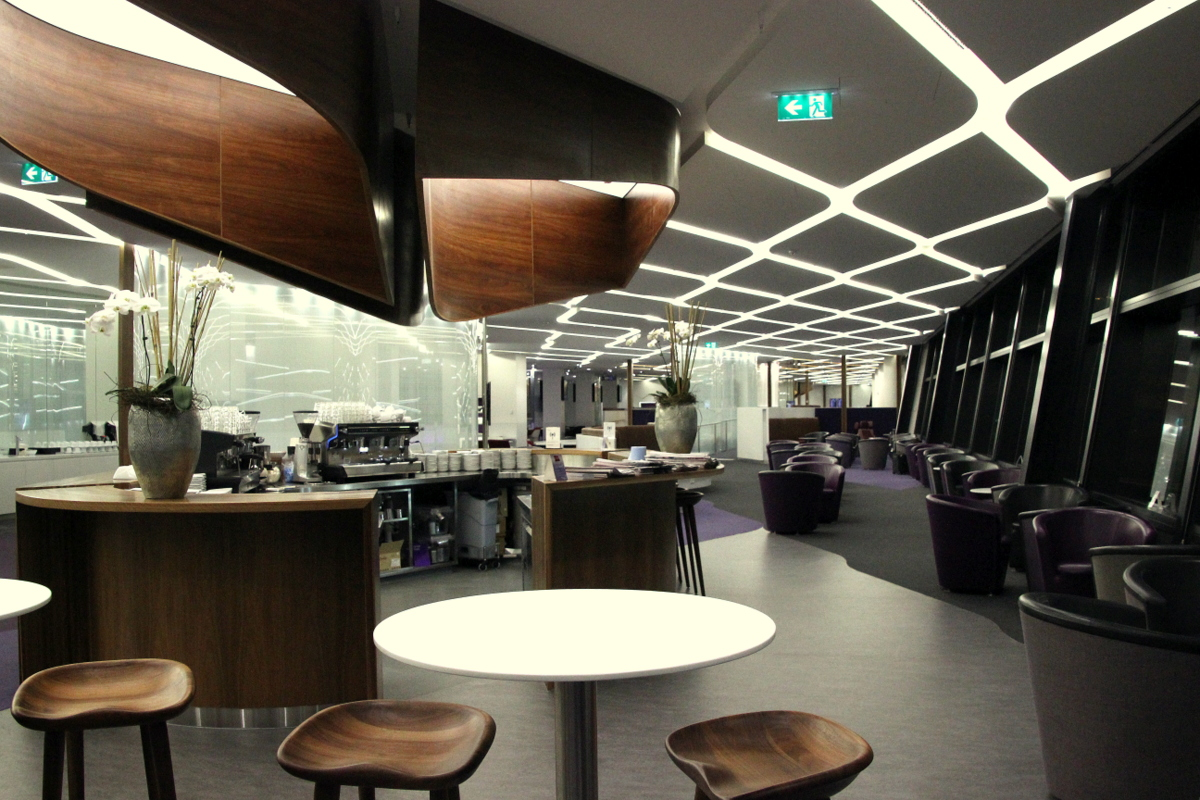
Virgin Australia's lounge at Melbourne Airport in 2014

To capture a share of the business traveller market, Virgin decided to provide a members' lounge facility for travellers. Originally this was called The Blue Room and provided facilities to members and guests on a pay-as-you-go basis. Many of these facilities became available when Virgin relocated into the former Ansett terminals across the country, with the defunct Golden Wing club lounges left behind being used as Blue Room lounges, complete with furnishings.

In 2006, Virgin revamped the lounge facilities and re-launched the product as The Lounge, which offered all-inclusive facilities on a membership fee or casual fee basis. Upgraded facilities provided included buffet food and refreshments, newspapers, showers, computers, and Wi-Fi internet access for travellers.

In May 2011, Virgin again renamed the lounge, simply referring to it as Virgin Australia Lounge – designed to be a premium experience, with spaces designed for specific uses and 'moods'.

Lounges currently operated:

- Adelaide Domestic Lounge
- Brisbane Domestic Lounge
- Brisbane Beyond Lounge
- Canberra Domestic Lounge
- Gold Coast Domestic Lounge
- Melbourne Domestic Lounge
- Melbourne Beyond Lounge
- Perth Domestic Lounge (T1)
- Sydney Domestic Lounge
- Sydney Beyond Lounge

Lounges formerly operated and now closed:

- Alice Springs Domestic Lounge
- Cairns Domestic Lounge
- Canberra 'The Club' Lounge
- Darwin Domestic Lounge
- Mackay Domestic Lounge
- Perth Domestic Lounge (T2)
- Perth 'The Club' Lounge
- Wellington International Lounge

=== Access ===
Complimentary lounge access is available to Velocity Frequent Flyer Gold and Platinum members when flying with Virgin Australia, or when travelling in Business Class.

Membership is also available and can be purchased online by logging into a passenger's Velocity Frequent Flyer account. As of July 2021, membership costs AUD399 per year and there is no joining fee. Lifetime memberships and single-use passes are also available for purchase.

== Velocity Frequent Flyer Program ==
Virgin Australia launched its frequent-flyer program Velocity Rewards in 2005, with partner National Australia Bank offering a companion credit card. By 2007, points collected from selected Westpac, American Express and Diners Club cards could be transferred to Velocity Rewards, and effective September 2008, ANZ reward visa card points as well. The program reached 4 million members by the end of 2014.

Status levels were introduced to the program in late 2007 as part of continued efforts to attract business travellers. Alongside the entry-level "red" status, frequent travellers were given the opportunity to attain "silver" and "gold" status, each with its own set of benefits.

Initially, Velocity was different from most other frequent flyer programs, as points were earned relative to the cost of a flight, rather than distance. Velocity members originally earned six points per dollar spent on Virgin Australia flights. This was later altered due to the introduction of status levels; Red members now earned five points per dollar, Silver members remained at six points, and Gold members earned seven. Points accrual on V Australia, as well as the majority of Velocity's airline partners, has always based on distance.

Velocity was the first frequent flyer program in Australia to offer "any seat, any time" reward flight availability. The number of points required to redeem an award seat directly corresponds to the current fare of that seat, allowing any seat currently available to be redeemed. Qantas introduced a similar feature to their frequent flyer program in May 2008.

In August 2011, the program was relaunched as "Velocity Frequent Flyer" and a platinum status level was introduced, among other changes.

In July 2013, Velocity introduced the Global Wallet function, the first prepaid traveller card in Australia. The key feature of this card is it allows users to load money and store it in other supported currencies before travelling. Users can access ATMs around the world as well as shop anywhere that the Visa card is accepted. Supported currencies include the Australian dollar (AUD), Canadian dollar (CAD), euro (EUR), pound sterling (GBP), Hong Kong dollar (HKD), Japanese yen (JPY), New Zealand dollar (NZD), Singapore dollar (SGD), Thai baht (THB), US dollar (USD) and South African rand (ZAR). Travellers earn one Velocity point per $1 spent overseas and one point per $2 spent in Australia.

In 2015, Velocity Frequent Flyer won the 'Program of the Year" in the Middle East & Asia/Oceania District category at the Freddie Awards.

== Controversies ==
- In 2003, a man with a disability and having incomplete quadriplegia was removed from a Virgin Blue flight because staff thought he was drunk or a terrorist. He subsequently settled a lawsuit against the airline.
- In October 2005, the airline lost a discrimination case over the age of flight attendants they employed. Eight former flight attendants aged over 34 previously employed by the collapsed Ansett Australia had applied for employment with Virgin Blue but none had gained work. They claimed they were discriminated against because of their age and won compensation in March 2006. The airline's appeal against this decision failed and the company was ordered to pay costs.
- In May 2006, a controversy arose over Virgin Blue's policy with regard to passengers with disabilities. Former Chief Executive Brett Godfrey affirmed the policy of the company that passengers who were "unable to look after themselves on board should travel with carers". After a hearing in the Australian Human Rights and Equal Opportunity Commission, Virgin Blue backed down from this policy, agreeing to limit it to passengers weighing over 130 kg. However the chair of the ACT Disability Advisory Council, Craig Wallace, who uses a wheelchair, was refused passage on a Virgin Blue flight booked for 8 October 2006. In a media release on 29 September, ACTDAC claimed that "Virgin Blue has also refused to refund $418 in fares from the flight for Mr Wallace or Council staff. Ironically, they have listed these fares as a 'credit' – a credit Mr Wallace or other people in his situation are prohibited from accessing by Virgin's own policy".
- In January 2007, Virgin Blue attracted controversy when its staff at Adelaide Airport ordered a passenger to remove a T-shirt bearing the slogan "World's Number One Terrorist" above an image of George W. Bush. The wearer, Allen Jasson from London, was informed that the garment was potentially offensive. Jasson had also experienced difficulty on earlier flights with Qantas. A spokeswoman for Virgin Blue defended the decision.
- In January 2011, the airline was fined $110,000 after breaking anti-spamming regulations. Consumers complained they were unable to unsubscribe from the airline's mailing list. The Australian Communications and Media Authority said the airline would "Engage an independent third party to thoroughly assess its email marketing processes and to implement any recommended changes."
- Virgin Australia's policy of not allowing male passengers to sit next to children travelling alone for fear of child molestation has been criticised by persons concerned as act of discrimination against men (Airline sex discrimination policy controversy). Following a public outcry, the company announced it would review its policy.
- In mid-2014, the Australian Competition & Consumer Commission took legal action against Virgin Australia in respect of drip pricing.
- In 2020, Perth Airport staff parked heavy vehicles and heavy equipment in front of some Virgin Australia aircraft to prevent them from moving, owing to unpaid debts accumulated by the airline throughout 2020.
- The way in which Virgin Australia complies with the requirement of majority-Australian ownership for airlines operating international flights to and from Australia. has been criticised as a exploiting a loophole in the legislation.
- In July 2025, unions representing Flight and Cabin Crew, the Australian Federation of Air Pilots, and the Flight Attendant Association of Australia both escalated disputes to the Fair Work Commission in relation to the air crew layover hotel in Perth. Both unions claiming the current hotel was not up to standard in regards to cleanliness and crew safety. Virgin responded to the claims stating management choose to stay at the same hotel due to it being “clean, comfortable and appropriate.”
- In September 2025 a mother was asked to leave the Virgin Australia business lounge in Melbourne Airport after she discreetly began expressing breast milk for her six-month-old twins. The woman, who was a GP and business-class passenger, was pumping under her clothing when the lounge staff told her it was inappropriate and suggested she use a bathroom or leave the lounge because other guests were allegedly uncomfortable. Despite her explaining that breastfeeding and expressing milk are legally protected in Australia, a manager asked her to leave. The incident sparked widespread backlash when she shared it publicly. Virgin Australia later apologised, acknowledged the handling was wrong, and confirmed that mothers are allowed to breastfeed and express milk in their lounges. Virgin hasn't commented on formal penalties or changes to the employees' status.
- In August 2026, staff removed a disabled man from an aircraft despite the man not receiving proper accommodations. One customer service representative asked the man to delete the footage. Virgin later apologised, but the passenger submitted a request to the Human Rights Commission, which had been accepted.
