= Virgin Australia Airlines (NZ) =

Airline based in New Zealand

Virgin Australia (NZ)
IATA	ICAO	Call sign
DJ	PBN	BLUEBIRD
- Founded: 2003
- Commenced operations: 29 January 2004
- Ceased operations: June 2020
- Hubs: Auckland
- Secondary hubs: Christchurch
- Focus cities: Brisbane; Nukuʻalofa; Rarotonga; Sydney
- Frequent-flyer program: Velocity Rewards
- Alliance: Air New Zealand
- Fleet size: 9
- Destinations: 16
- Parent company: Virgin Australia Holdings
- Headquarters: Christchurch, Canterbury, New Zealand
- Key people: Mark Pitt (CEO)
- Website: virginaustralia.com

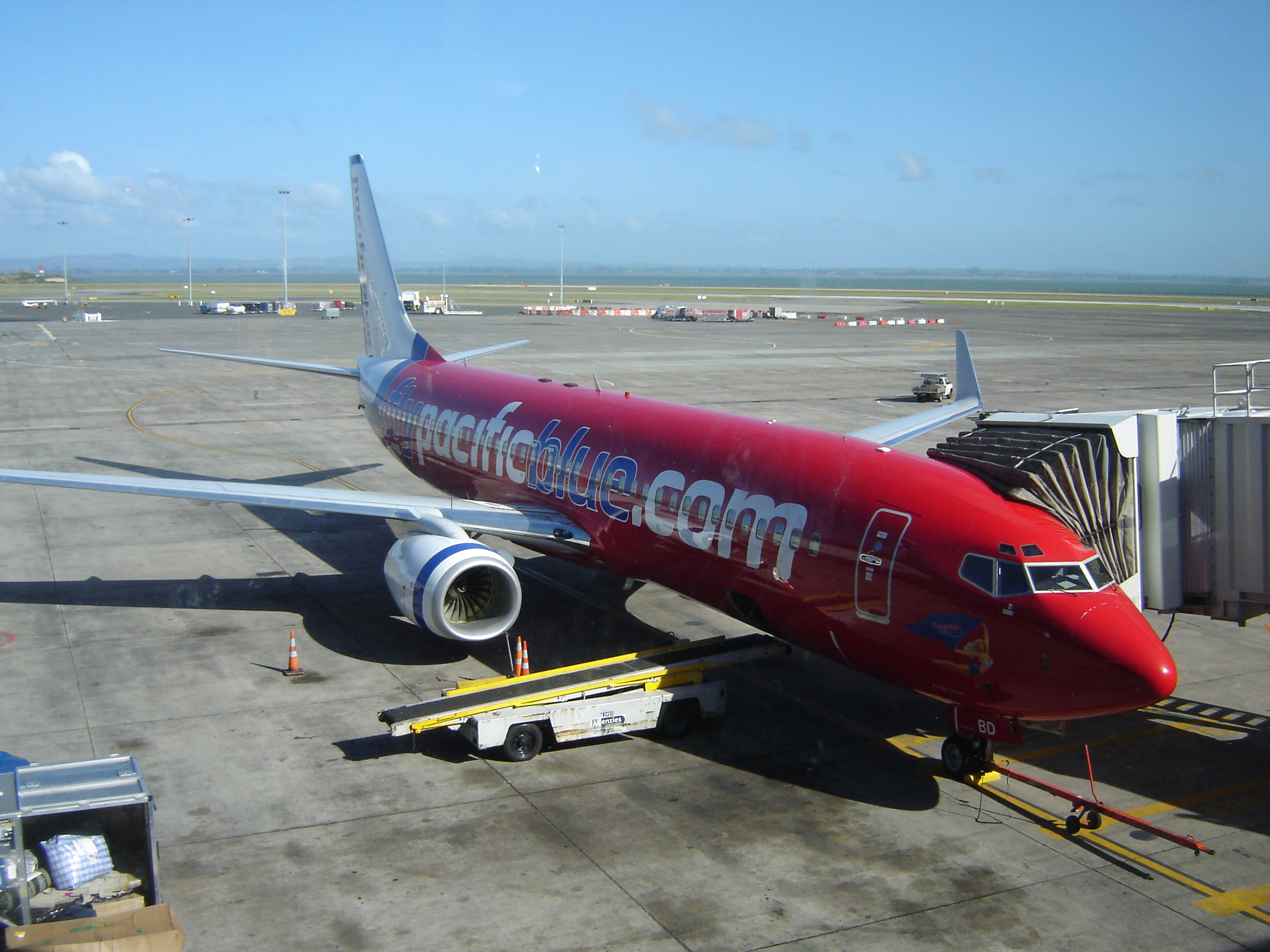
The former livery on a Pacific Blue Boeing 737-800 at Auckland Airport in 2005

Virgin Australia Airlines (NZ) Limited, formerly Pacific Blue Airlines (NZ) Limited, was an airline based in New Zealand. It was established as the New Zealand subsidiary of Australian airline Virgin Blue. It was a fully owned subsidiary of Virgin Australia Holdings. It was renamed Virgin Australia Airlines (NZ) Ltd in December 2011 when its parent company decided to bring all its airlines under the one banner.

It was based at Christchurch and Auckland and operated air services between New Zealand and Australia as well as the Pacific Islands. It also operated services on behalf of Virgin Samoa (formerly known as Polynesian Blue).

The airline has brought all its flying under its parent VA Air Operating Certificate. The final New Zealand registered Pacific Blue aircraft finished up flying 13 March 2015 bringing a visible end to Pacific Blue and being renamed to Virgin Australia NZ (VANZ). With the withdrawal of the last aircraft, the New Zealand register connection ended after 11 years of aircraft on the New Zealand register from 23 January 2004 to 14 March 2015.

== History ==
The airline was established in 2003 and started operations on 29 January 2004 with a service between Christchurch and Brisbane, Australia.

On 1 August 2007, the ICAO code was changed from PBI to PBN. This was done in consultation with air traffic controllers to prevent confusion between the letter I and the number 1 in flight plans.

On 21 August 2007, Pacific Blue announced its intention to begin domestic services in New Zealand with the first flights commencing 12 November 2007. The initial routes were Auckland–Wellington, Christchurch–Wellington and Auckland–Christchurch. Later Christchurch to Dunedin flights started.

Pacific Blue announced its rollout of Premium economy seating across its fleet from March 2010 to match that of its sister Virgin Blue. Premium economy is the front three rows of each aircraft – fitted with a unique red leather converter seat that folds from three abreast to two abreast when used in Premium economy configuration.

On 16 August 2010, it was announced that Pacific Blue would be withdrawing from the New Zealand domestic market, with aircraft being reallocated to tran-tasman and medium-haul routes.

The last Pacific Blue domestic New Zealand service was operated on 17 October 2010, from Wellington to Auckland.

Pacific Blue was renamed Virgin Australia Airlines (NZ) Ltd in December 2011, as part of a unification of the company's holdings under a common brand.

In March 2015, the last New Zealand registered Virgin 737 ZK-PBL was withdrawn and placed on the Australian register, ending over 11 years of New Zealand AOC operations. All aircraft were distributed between Virgin Australia's domestic and international arms on the VH register.

VANZ Auckland and Christchurch based pilots and cabin crew continued to fly the same routes and some of the same aircraft under the Virgin Australia International Airlines air operator certificate.

On 3 April 2020, amid the COVID-19 outbreak and worldwide lockdowns, Virgin Australia closed its New Zealand bases, leaving all 208 pilots and over 300 cabin crew redundant.

The affected unions (NZALPA and E Tu) were highly critical of this decision and the consultation that proceeded it, as Virgin would not provide any meaningful information for counter proposals to be formulated.

== Destinations ==
The airline operated scheduled passenger services between New Zealand and Australia; and to the Pacific Islands. New Zealand served airports are: Auckland, Wellington, Christchurch, Dunedin and Queenstown. Formerly Hamilton was served from Brisbane services ended in October 2012. International destinations served were: Brisbane, Gold Coast, Melbourne, Nadi, Port Vila, Apia–Faleolo, Nuku'alofa, Rarotonga and Sydney. Formerly Cairns (ex Auckland), Port Moresby, and Honiara (both ex Brisbane) were served.

== Fleet ==
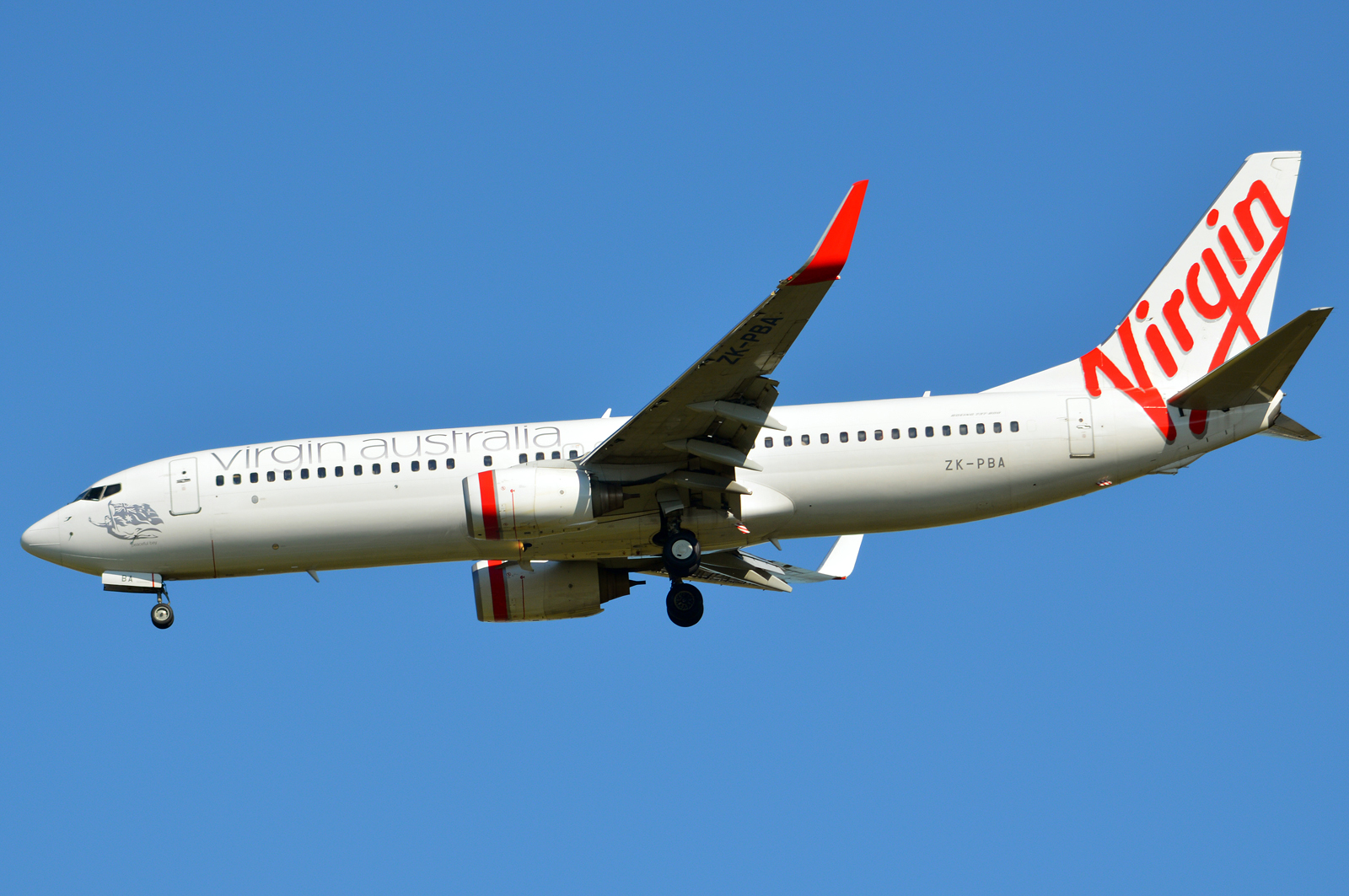
The new livery on a Boeing 737-800 approaching Brisbane Airport in 2012

Operations commenced with one Boeing 737-800. By 2009 the fleet consisted of 10 Boeing 737-800s.

Fleet
Aircraft	Total	Passengers
Boeing 737-800	9	176 (168 economy + 8 business class)

== See also ==
- List of defunct airlines of New Zealand
- History of aviation in New Zealand
