= Virgin Australia Holdings =

Holding company for Virgin in Australia

Virgin Australia Holdings Limited
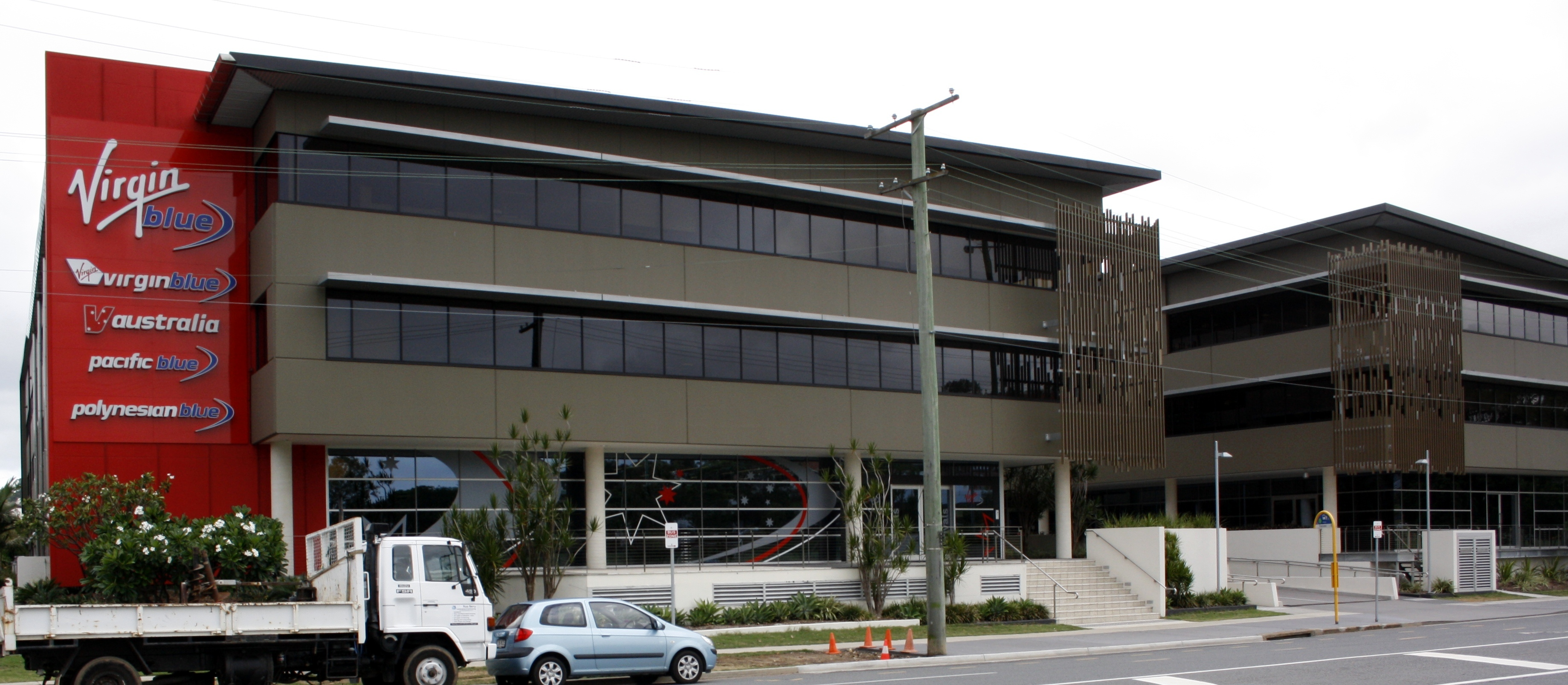
- Virgin Village, the Virgin Australia Holdings former head office in Bowen Hills
- Formerly: Virgin Blue Holdings
- Type: Public
- Traded as: ASX: VGN
- Industry: Aviation and tourism
- Founded: 2000; 26 years ago
- Founders: Richard Branson; Virgin Group
- Headquarters: South Bank, Brisbane, Australia
- Area served: Oceania
- Key people: Peter Warne (Chairman); Dave Emerson (CEO)
- Revenue: A$5.4 billion (2024)
- Owner: Bain Capital (40%); Qatar Airways (23%); Virgin Group; Queensland Investment Corporation
- Number of employees: 8,000 (2025)
- Subsidiaries: Virgin Australia; Virgin Australia Regional Airlines; Velocity Frequent Flyer
- Website: www.virginaustralia.com

Virgin Australia Holdings Limited is the holding company that owns and operates Virgin Australia and Virgin Australia Regional Airlines. It previously operated Pacific Blue Airlines, Tigerair Australia and joint-venture airline Polynesian Blue which were absorbed into Virgin Australia in December 2011. Its head office is located in South Bank, Brisbane.

After being placed in administration in April 2020, it was purchased by Bain Capital in August 2020 and relisted on the Australian Securities Exchange (ASX) in 2025.

== History ==
=== Founding and early history ===
Former Virgin Blue Holdings logo, used until December 2011

Virgin Blue Holdings was formed in 2000 as a wholly owned subsidiary of the Virgin Group. In 2001, the then Air New Zealand owned Ansett Australia made a buyout offer of $250 million, which was publicly rejected by Richard Branson. In 2002, Virgin came to an agreement with Patrick Corporation to invest in the airline, to allow it to grow into a national airline, filling the void following the demise of Ansett Australia. In return for a 50% share of the company, Patrick invested $260 million. At the time, the view was that Patrick's shareholding would also allow the company to benefit from their new shareholder's political connections with the Howard government, and also "greenwash" the company, allowing it to be described as Australian-owned.

In 2003, Virgin Blue Holdings was floated on the Australian Securities Exchange as Virgin Group sought to sell down its holdings.

In early 2005, Patrick launched a hostile takeover for Virgin Australia Holdings. Patrick had been unhappy for some time with the company's direction. By the closure of the offer, Patrick held 62% of the company, giving it control. Virgin Group retained a 25% share. In 2006, Patrick Corporation was taken over by Toll Holdings, who maintained the ownership of shares in Virgin Blue Holdings. In 2008, the group announced a plan to distribute 98.3% of its shares in the company to its shareholders, thus making itself no longer a majority stakeholder. At the time, Toll Holdings owned 62.7% of the company and had previously attempted to sell the share to no avail.

In January 2011, Air New Zealand purchased a 15% shareholding in Virgin Blue Holdings. In June 2013, this was increased to 23%. In September 2012, Etihad Airways purchased a 10% shareholding, this was later increased to 20%. A month later, Singapore Airlines bought a 10% stake in Virgin Australia Holdings. In April 2013, this was increased to 20%. The same month, Virgin Australia Holdings announced it had purchased a 60% stake in Tigerair Australia with the transaction concluded in July 2013. Tiger would continue to operate as a low cost subsidiary of Virgin Australia for 20 years.

In April 2013, Virgin Australia Holdings completed its acquisition of regional airline Skywest Airlines and rebranded it Virgin Australia Regional Airlines. In October 2014, Virgin Australia Holdings announced plans to acquire the 40% stake of Tigerair Australia still held by Tiger Airways Holdings for $1, giving Virgin full ownership. Virgin would retain the Tigerair name and acquire the brand rights for Tigerair to operate to some international destinations from Australia. This acquisition was completed in February 2015 with tigerair becoming a fully owned subsidiary of Virgin Australia Holdings.

In March 2016, Air New Zealand announced plans to divest itself from Virgin Australia Holdings. Air New Zealand CEO, Christopher Luxon announced intentions to resign from the Board of Directors for Virgin Australia. It was also announced that Air New Zealand were unaware of its position of whether they were divesting all or part of their shares.

Air New Zealand's partnership with Virgin Australia ceased not long after the decision to withdraw from the board and sell its equity stake.

In May 2016, HNA Group (part owner of Hainan Airlines), announced plans to purchase a 13% stake in Virgin Australia Holdings, which if approved will see existing owners' shares diluted. Air New Zealand's stake would become 22.5%, Etihad would hold 21.8%, Singapore Airlines 20.1% and Virgin Group 8.7%. A month later, Air New Zealand sold 19.9% of VAH to Nanshan Group (majority owner of Qingdao Airlines); and in October, Air New Zealand sold its remaining 2.5% of VAH to Nanshan Group (majority owner of Qingdao Airlines). A month later, Virgin Australia CEO John Borghetti wrote to the airline's pilots to reassure them the airline was in a sound financial position following publication of a report suggesting the airline was approaching insolvency.

=== Voluntary administration and acquisition by Bain Capital ===
In March 2020, Virgin Australia halted all flights from international sector and in early April 2020, all domestic flights except for some services from Sydney to Melbourne due to the COVID-19 pandemic with 8,000 staff would be stood down. After a request for $1.4 billion loan from the federal government was rejected, in April 2020, Virgin Australia Holdings was placed in voluntary administration with Deloitte appointed as administrator. It continued to trade whilst Deloitte sought to sell the business, with Bain Capital, BGH Capital, Cyrus Capital Partners and Indigo Partners shortlisted to bid. The administrator listed Bain Capital and Cyrus Capital Partners to make final bids. On 26 June 2020, the administrators announced that Bain Capital's bids to acquire Virgin Australia had been successful with current equity holders being wiped out. Subject to being approved by creditors, the deal is expected to be finalised in August 2020. The Queensland Government announced they had partnered with Bain Capital offering $200 million in return for maintain the airline being in Queensland. Bain's plan included reducing the fleet size from 130 to 70-80 aircraft and shutting down the Tigerair brand. Furthermore, they planned to return Virgin's A330's to lessors and mothball their 777-300ER fleet until 2021. The sale was approved by creditors on 4 September 2020. In October 2020, Virgin Group and the Queensland Investment Corporation took stakes of 5% and 2% in the company.

=== Qatar Airways stake and relisting ===
In October 2024, Qatar Airways agreed terms to purchase a 25% stake in Virgin Australia Holdings. After receiving clearance by the Australian Competition & Consumer Commission and Foreign Investment Review Board, the deal was approved by the Treasurer of Australia in February 2025.

In June 2025, Virgin relisted on the Australian Securities Exchange, with Bain and Qatar Airways selling 28 and 2 percentage points of their stakes respectively.

== Head office ==
Virgin Australia Holdings has its head office at 275 Grey Street, South Brisbane. It relocated there in 2020 during the COVID-19 pandemic.

== Previous head office ==
Virgin Australia Holdings had its head office in Virgin Village in Bowen Hills, Brisbane. As of 2008, 1,000 employees worked at Virgin Village. The building, with about 13,220 square metres (142,300 sq ft) A-grade office space, was triple net leased to Virgin Blue.

As the airline started operations, it decided to place its head office in the Brisbane area. Brett Godfrey, the-then chief executive of Virgin Blue, said in 2006 that the decision "was a long considered one and has worked well". The airline originally had its head office in Fortitude Valley. The airline purchased a $61 million site in Bowen Hills for its new head office. The firm Sunland Group, which had acquired the Bowen Hills site for $8 million in 2005, had scheduled to complete the new head office in March, and the airline would be ready to move into the new head office by August of the following year. The current head office facility, Virgin Village, formally opened on 17 October 2008.
