= Velocity Frequent Flyer =

Frequent-flyer program of Virgin Australia whose airline call sign is "Velocity"

- Type: Velocity Frequent Flyer the loyalty program of Virgin Australia
- Industry: Airline Loyalty marketing and enterprise services
- Headquarters: Sydney, New South Wales, Australia
- Key people: Nick Rohrlach CEO
- Services: Customer insight and strategy; Loyalty marketing and programs; Customer experience management
- Number of employees: +250
- Parent: Virgin Australia Holdings
- Website: www.velocityfrequentflyer.com

Velocity is the frequent-flyer program of Virgin Australia Holdings.

== History ==
Velocity was launched by Virgin Blue in 2005 as Velocity Rewards, with partner National Australia Bank offering a companion credit card. Initially, Velocity differed from most other frequent flyer programs with points earned being based on the cost of a flight, rather than distance. Velocity members originally earned six points per dollar spent on Virgin Blue flights. Points could also be earned with Emirates, Europcar and Virgin Atlantic.

By 2007, points earned in loyalty programs operated by Westpac, American Express and Diners Club could be transferred to Velocity Rewards, as well as from the ANZ loyalty program from September 2008.

As part of Virgin's effort to attract business travellers, status levels were introduced to the program in late 2007. Alongside the entry-level "Red" status, members could attain "Silver" and "Gold" status, each with its own set of benefits. With the introduction of status levels, the earning rate was changed: Red members earned five points per dollar, Silver members remained at 6 points, and Gold members earned seven.

Velocity was the first frequent flyer program in Australia to offer "any seat, any time" reward flight availability. The number of points required to redeem an award seat directly corresponds to the current fare of that seat, allowing any seat currently available to be redeemed. Qantas introduced a similar feature to their frequent flyer program in May 2008.

By February 2008, Velocity Rewards had 1.3 million members and Virgin Blue stated it was considering selling it or entering into a joint venture once its operation was profitable, and considered a membership of 1.6 to 1.7 million members would put the operation in a break-even position. The program reached 4 million members by the end of 2014.

In August 2011, the program was renamed "Velocity" and a "Platinum" status level was introduced, among other changes. The changes included changes to the bonus system: Red status members now earn 5 points per dollar spent, and Silver members earn a bonus of 50%, Gold members earn a bonus of 75% and Platinum members earn a bonus of 100%.

In July 2013, Velocity introduced the Global Wallet, the first travel money card in Australia, which can be used as a Visa prepaid card. Velocity Global Wallet was discontinued on 1 February 2021.

== Associated products ==
=== Velocity credit cards ===
Velocity co-branded (direct-earn) credit cards earn points on purchases and these points are automatically allocated to the holder's Velocity account each month. Co-branded cards are offered by American Express, NAB, Virgin Money and Westpac. Most banks and credit companies have cards which earn points into their rewards program, which can then be transferred to another program such as Velocity.

=== Global Wallet card ===
The Velocity Global Wallet prepaid Visa product was owned by Cuscal and managed by Rev Australia Pty Ltd. The card was designed to be used as a travel wallet card, where holders were able to earn points on purchases and avoid overseas transaction fees. The Global Wallet card allowed the holder to load money onto the card in Australian dollars (AUD), up to a total value of A$25,000. As many as ten currencies were able to be stored on the card.

The card could be used as a Visa prepaid card. Fees were charged to make purchases in foreign currencies, and for withdrawal of cash at ATMs. The exchange rates were locked in at the time the currencies were bought, and not at the time of a transaction, as would be the case with a credit card; and the funds held on the account did not earn interest. Velocity Global Wallet was discontinued in February 2021.

== Awards ==
The Velocity Frequent Flyer program, then called Velocity Rewards, won the 2009 Freddie Awards for best frequent flyer program, best award redemption, best affinity credit card, best member communications, best website. This was the fourth consecutive Freddie Awards that Velocity has won. Velocity Frequent Flyer also won the "program of the year" award for the third year running at the 2015 Freddie Awards.
