= International Air Services Commission =

The International Air Services Commission (IASC) is an independent Australian Government statutory agency, responsible to the Minister for Transport. The IASC's role is to determine the outcomes of applications by existing and prospective Australian airlines for capacity and route entitlements available under air services arrangements. These determinations allocate the available capacity on a route to one or more carriers and set conditions, where these are considered appropriate.

The IASC is composed of a chairperson and two members, appointed on a part-time basis. Its office in Canberra is assisted by a small Secretariat.

== Sources ==
http://www.iasc.gov.au/about/index.aspx
