= Bellevue Airport =

Airport in Western Australia

- IATA: QBU; ICAO: YBLU

Summary
- Airport type: Private
- Operator: Xstrata Nickel Australasia Operations Pty. Ltd.
- Location: Leinster, Western Australia
- Elevation AMSL: 1,555 ft (474 m)
- Coordinates: 27°36′46″S 120°35′38″E

Map
- Location in Western Australia

Runways
Direction	Length		Surface
Direction	m	ft	Surface
01/19	2,000	6,562	Asphalt
- Sources: Australian AIP and aerodrome chart

Bellevue Airport (IATA: QBU, ICAO: YBLU) is located near Leinster in Western Australia, and is not in any way related to the Perth suburb with the same name.

== Airlines and destinations ==
Airlines	Destinations
Alliance Airlines	Charter: Perth Kalgoorlie,

== See also ==
- List of airports in Western Australia
- Aviation transport in Australia
