= ZNE =

ZNE may refer to:

- Newman Airport (IATA: ZNE)
- Zande language (ISO 639: zne)
- Zero-Net-Energy; see Zero-energy building

== See also ==
- Zine, a collection of self-published work reproduced by photocopying
