= List of the busiest airports in Australia =

Total monthly arrivals to Australia since 1976

This is a list of the busiest airports in Australia by passenger traffic, passenger movements and aircraft movements.

== Top 50 airports by revenue passenger traffic ==
This is a list of the revenue passenger traffic by airport from the financial year 2024–25, compiled by the Bureau of Infrastructure, Transport and Regional Economics.

Rank (2024–25)	Airport	Location	Domestic revenue passengers	International revenue passengers	Total revenue passengers
1	Sydney Airport	Sydney, New South Wales	25,094,541	16,751,321	41,845,862
2	Melbourne Airport	Melbourne, Victoria	23,998,868	11,963,866	35,962,734
3	Brisbane Airport	Brisbane, Queensland	17,322,630	6,504,061	23,826,691
4	Perth Airport	Perth, Western Australia	9,070,312	5,130,190	14,200,502
5	Adelaide Airport	Adelaide, South Australia	7,384,087	1,029,690	8,413,777
6	Gold Coast Airport	Gold Coast, Queensland	5,734,010	624,270	5,998,280
7	Cairns Airport	Cairns, Queensland	4,042,523	664,953	4,707,476
8	Hobart Airport	Hobart, Tasmania	2,801,784	20,097	2,821,811
9	Canberra Airport	Canberra, Australian Capital Territory	2,764,770	38,371	2,803,141
10	Darwin Airport	Darwin, Northern Territory	1,627,703	234,831	1,862,534
11	Townsville Airport	Townsville, Queensland	1,658,216	0	1,658,216
12	Sunshine Coast Airport	Sunshine Coast, Queensland	1,594,932	35,485	1,630,417
13	Launceston Airport	Launceston, Tasmania	1,433,462	0	1,433,462
14	Newcastle Airport	Newcastle, New South Wales	1,183,708	0	1,183,708
15	Mackay Airport	Mackay, Queensland	902,355	0	902,355
16	Karratha Airport	Karratha, Western Australia	652,134	0	652,134
17	Rockhampton Airport	Rockhampton, Queensland	644,598	0	644,598
18	Ballina Byron Gateway Airport	Ballina, New South Wales	612,073	0	612,073
19	Whitsunday Coast Airport	Proserpine, Queensland	520,698	0	520,698
20	Hamilton Island Airport	Hamilton Island, Queensland	489,076	0	489,076
21	Port Hedland International Airport	Port Hedland, Western Australia	483,820	0	483,820
22	Broome International Airport	Broome, Western Australia	444,340	0	444,340
23	Newman Airport	Newman, Western Australia	430,415	0	430,415
24	Kalgoorlie–Boulder Airport	Kalgoorlie, Western Australia	374,444	0	374,444
25	Alice Springs Airport	Alice Springs, Northern Territory	356,813	0	356,813
26	Ayers Rock Airport	Yulara, Northern Territory	345,228	0	345,228
27	Paraburdoo Airport	Paraburdoo, Western Australia	275,462	0	275,462
28	Coffs Harbour Airport	Coffs Harbour, New South Wales	250,298	0	250,298
29	Mount Isa Airport	Mount Isa, Queensland	239,424	0	239,424
30	Albury Airport	Albury, New South Wales	223,069	0	223,069
31	Gladstone Airport	Gladstone, Queensland	221,503	0	221,503
32	Wagga Wagga Airport	Wagga Wagga, New South Wales	212,773	0	212,773
33	Port Macquarie Airport	Port Macquarie, New South Wales	190,020	0	190,020
34	Mildura Airport	Mildura, Victoria	189,719	0	189,719
35	Emerald Airport	Emerald, Queensland	195,908	0	195,908
36	Dubbo Airport	Dubbo, New South Wales	195,095	0	195,095
37	Tamworth Airport	Tamworth, New South Wales	172,980	0	172,980
38	Port Lincoln Airport	Port Lincoln, South Australia	171,635	0	171,635
39	Bundaberg Airport	Bundaberg, Queensland	165,224	0	165,224
40	Hervey Bay Airport	Hervey Bay, Queensland	154,744	0	154,744
41	Devonport Airport	Devonport, Tasmania	121,562	0	121,562
42	Moranbah Airport	Moranbah, Queensland	111,076	0	111,076
43	Horn Island Airport	Thursday Island, Queensland (Note: Thursday Island is listed as the name in the dataset; however, the airport is located on Horn Island, about 8km from Thursday Island.)	110,267	0	110,267
44	Geraldton Airport	Geraldton, Western Australia	109,887	0	109,887
45	Armidale Airport	Armidale, New South Wales	105,691	0	105,691
46	Olympic Dam Airport	Olympic Dam, South Australia	103,589	0	103,589
47	Learmonth Airport	Exmouth, Western Australia	103,108	0	103,108
48	Orange Airport	Orange, New South Wales	99,332	0	99,332
49	East Kimberley Regional Airport	Kununurra, Western Australia	98,605	0	98,605
50	Weipa Airport	Weipa, Queensland	89,971	0	89,971

Note: data not available for Avalon Airport; regular public transport operations only.

== Top 10 airports by passenger movements ==
This is a list of the busiest airports in Australia by passenger movements (both inbound and outbound) compiled by the Bureau of Infrastructure, Transport and Regional Economics.

Rank	Airport	Location	IATA	1985–86	1990–91	1995–96	2000–01	2005–06	2010–11	2015–16	2016–17	2017–18	2018-19	2019-20	2020-21	2021-22	2022-23	2023-24	2024-25
1	Sydney Airport	Sydney, New South Wales	SYD	9,498,000	12,361,000	19,878,000	25,814,000	28,996,000	35,958,000	41,105,000	42,614,000	44,035,000	44,376,000	32,195,000	7,804,000	13,670,000	35,571,000	40,567,000	41,845,000
2	Melbourne Airport	Melbourne, Victoria	MEL	6,476,000	8,346,000	12,972,000	16,881,000	21,041,000	27,963,000	33,705,000	34,878,000	36,319,000	37,057,000	27,003,000	6,106,000	12,817,000	30,651,000	34,842,000	35,962,000
3	Brisbane Airport	Brisbane, Queensland	BNE	3,457,000	5,246,000	9,236,000	12,467,000	16,016,000	19,975,000	22,320,000	22,653,000	23,238,000	23,623,000	17,805,000	7,530,000	10,023,000	19,793,000	22,234,000	23,826,000
4	Perth Airport	Perth, Western Australia	PER	1,939,000	2,508,000	4,145,000	5,162,000	7,005,000	10,890,000	12,558,000	12,453,000	12,433,000	12,406,000	9,346,000	3,262,000	4,757,000	11,216,000	12,786,000	14,200,000
5	Adelaide Airport	Adelaide, South Australia	ADL	2,082,000	2,461,000	3,743,000	4,443,000	5,767,000	7,279,000	7,778,000	7,999,000	8,274,000	8,368,000	6,246,000	2,751,000	3,821,000	7,522,000	8,248,000	8,413,000
6	Gold Coast Airport	Gold Coast, Queensland	OOL	778,000	1,090,000	1,993,000	1,888,000	3,515,000	5,486,000	6,273,000	6,457,000	6,541,000	6,414,000	4,779,000	2,002,000	2,996,000	6,102,000	6,321,000	5,998,000
7	Cairns Airport	Cairns, Queensland	CNS	578,000	1,288,000	2,595,000	2,891,000	3,731,000	3,859,000	4,711,000	4,898,000	4,969,000	4,859,000	3,472,000	2,082,000	2,625,000	4,196,000	4,634,000	4,707,000
8	Hobart Airport	Hobart, Tasmania	HBA	506,000	590,000	850,000	974,000	1,606,000	1,903,000	2,313,000	2,441,000	2,596,000	2,726,000	2,074,000	1,037,000	1,506,000	2,532,000	2,677,000	2,821,000
9	Canberra Airport	Canberra, Australian Capital Territory	CBR	1,008,000	1,124,000	1,750,000	2,107,000	2,550,000	3,241,000	2,831,000	3,013,000	3,179,000	3,218,000	2,350,000	1,045,000	1,286,000	2,711,000	2,820,000	2,803,000
10	Townsville Airport	Townsville, Queensland	TSV	1,030,000	512,000	598,000	732,000	1,161,000	1,630,000	1,530,000	1,535,000	1,627,000	1,594,000	1,216,000	976,000	1,195,000	1,649,000	1,671,000	1,658,000

Note: Prior to the COVID-19 Pandemic, Darwin Airport ranked 10th.

== Top 10 airports by aircraft movements ==
This is a list of the busiest airports in Australia by aircraft movements compiled by Airservices Australia, this list includes regular public transport operations and private operations.

Rank	Airport	Location	IATA	2000	2005	2010	2015	2020	2025
1	Parafield Airport	Adelaide, South Australia	N/A	158,268	177,432	228,290	235,384	272,646	225,142
2	Moorabbin Airport	Melbourne, Victoria	MBW	256,644	264,734	252,218	242,542	268,054	251,968
3	Sydney Airport	Sydney, New South Wales	SYD	308,342	281,738	304,938	336,956	267,862	321,916
4	Archerfield Airport	Brisbane, Queensland	N/A	182,682	141,466	118,354	133,872	196,708	193,040
5	Bankstown Airport	Sydney, New South Wales	BWU	298,798	275,846	275,978	220,166	235,048	218,046
6	Jandakot Airport	Perth, Western Australia	JAD	265,700	372,300	295,516	222,874	226,932	229,386
7	Melbourne Airport	Melbourne, Victoria	MEL	174,462	180,278	205,202	235,314	188,560	237,240
8	Brisbane Airport	Brisbane, Queensland	BNE	169,198	164,538	187,956	220,154	173,426	216,140
9	Perth Airport	Perth, Western Australia	PER	103,198	101,648	124,640	138,728	118,466	160,874
10	Adelaide Airport	Adelaide, South Australia	ADL	112,554	106,840	101,560	106,630	87,482	106,328
