= GYZ =

GYZ or gyz may refer to:

- gyz, ISO 639-3 code for Geji language
- Gyz, songwriter and producer of 2021 single It's Up by Drake
- GYZ, IATA airport code for Gruyere Airport, Australia
- GYZ, division code for Gyantse County, China
