= Leonora Airport =

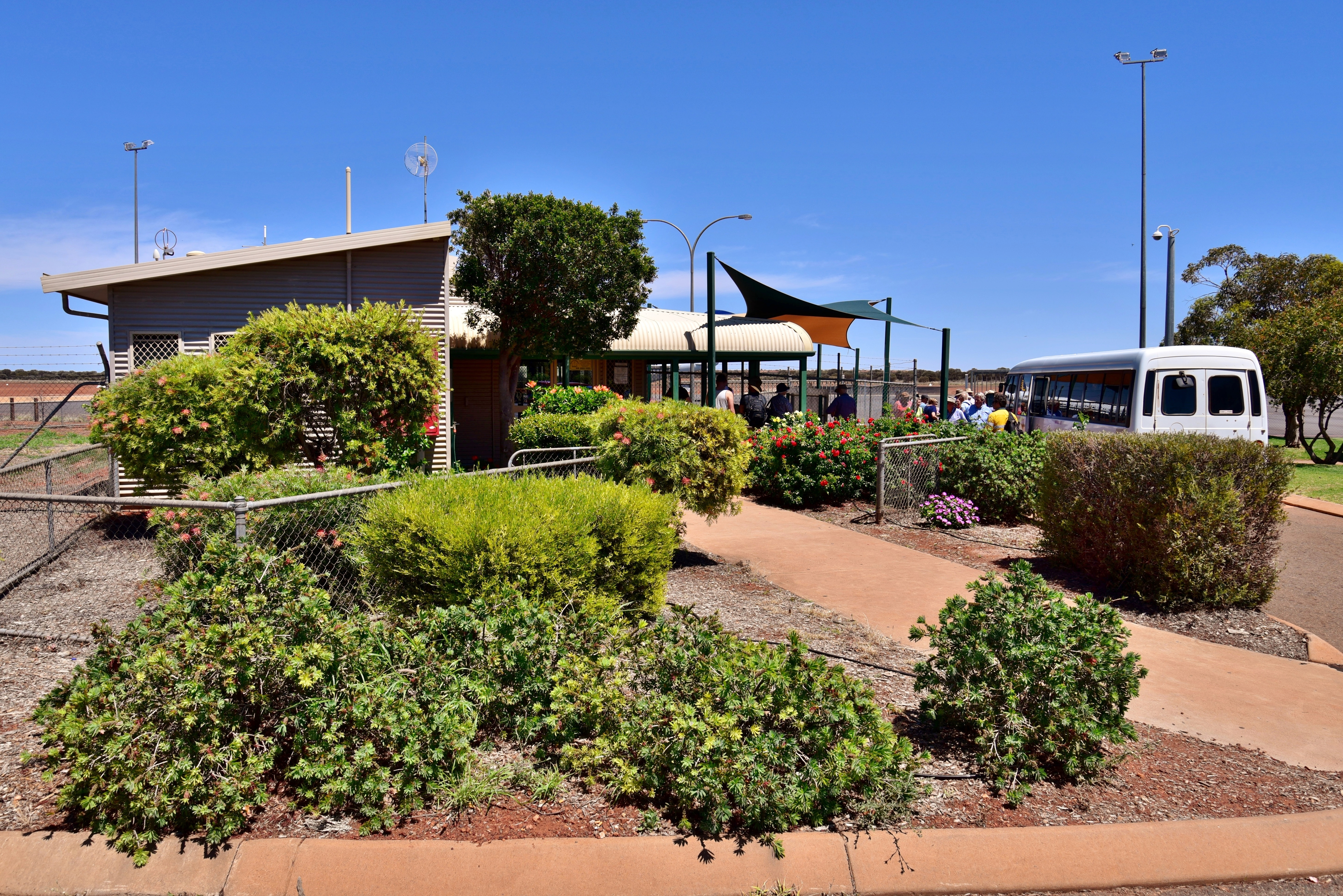
- The airport terminal, 2018
- IATA: LNO; ICAO: YLEO

Summary
- Airport type: Public
- Operator: Shire of Leonora
- Location: Leonora, Western Australia
- Elevation AMSL: 1,217 ft (371 m)
- Coordinates: 28°52′41″S 121°18′56″E

Map
- Location in Western Australia

Runways
Direction	Length		Surface
Direction	m	ft	Surface
04/22	2,018	6,621	Asphalt
12/30	1,140	3,740	Gravel
- Sources: Australian AIP and aerodrome chart

Leonora Airport (IATA: LNO, ICAO: YLEO) is an airport in Leonora, Western Australia. The airport is located along the western side of the townsite, with the terminal 1.5 km (0.93 mi) from the central business area. A new passenger terminal was constructed in 1997.

The airport received $161,617 in funds for security upgrades in 2005. Its status was raised in 2009.

== Airlines and destinations ==
Airlines	Destinations
Alliance Airlines	Perth
National Jet Express	Charter: Perth
Skippers Aviation	Charter: Laverton, Perth
Virgin Australia	Perth

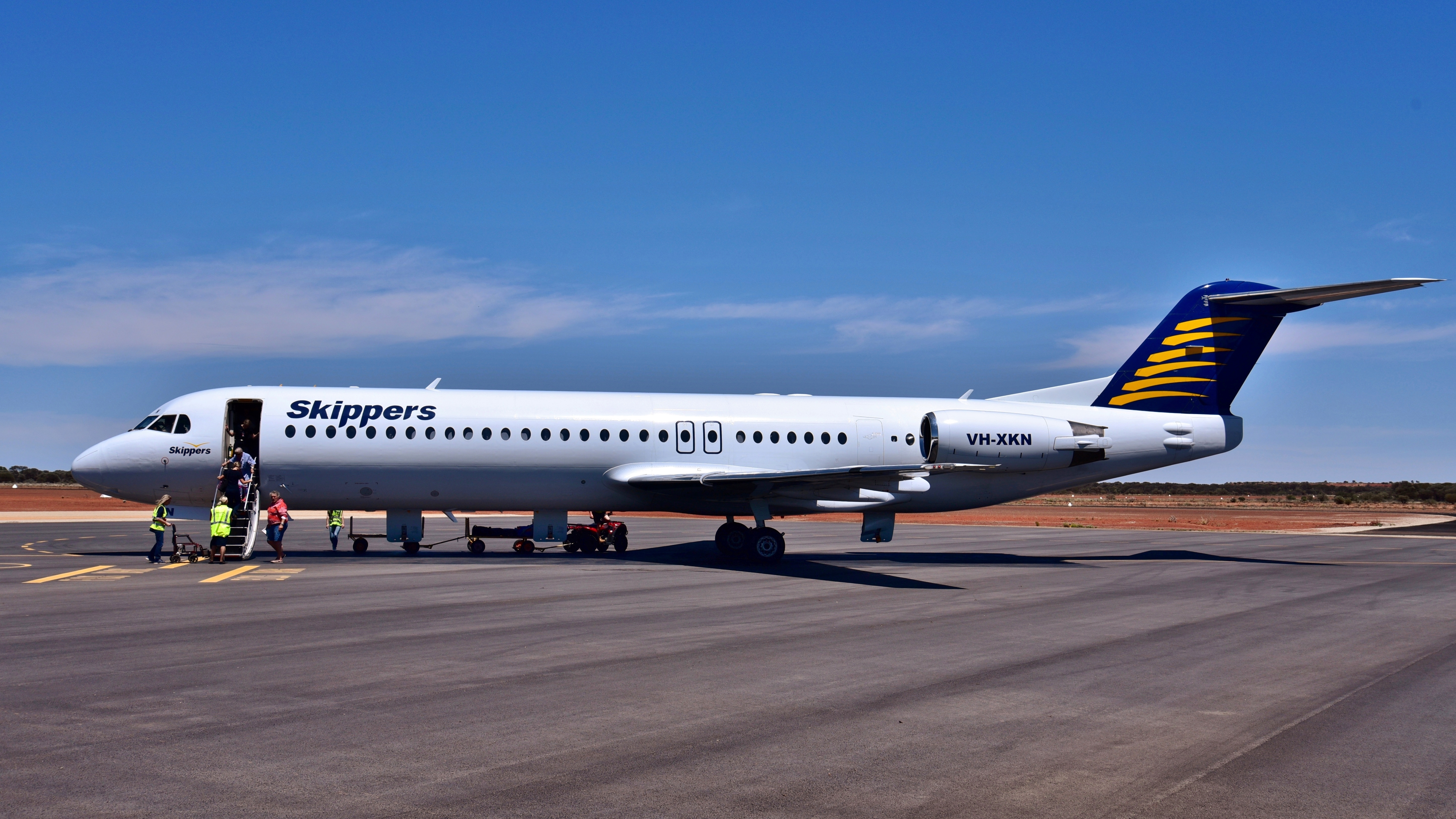
Skippers Fokker 100 VH-XKN at Lenora

== See also ==
- List of airports in Western Australia
- Aviation transport in Australia
