= Cunderdin Airport =

Airport in Western Australia

- IATA: none; ICAO: YCUN

Summary
- Airport type: Public
- Operator: Cunderdin Shire Council
- Location: Cunderdin, Western Australia
- Elevation AMSL: 705 ft / 215 m
- Coordinates: 31°37′20″S 117°13′00″E

Map
- Location in Western Australia

Runways
Direction	Length		Surface
Direction	m	ft	Surface
05/23	1,841	6,040	Asphalt
14/32	1,509	4,951	Asphalt
- Sources: Australian AIP and aerodrome chart

Cunderdin Airport (ICAO: YCUN) is located at Cunderdin, Western Australia.

== Proposed redevelopment ==
In February 2017, Western Australia-based Ascent Aviation proposed a $200 million redevelopment of Cunderdin Airport, initially to be used as a diversion airport for Perth Airport, and in the future host a pilot training college and facilities to handle cargo freighters. The proposed redevelopment would see the construction of a 2600m runway with full international landing aids and space for four A380-sized aircraft. It has been proposed as a diversion airport for Perth Airport due to it being approximately in fifteen minutes' flying distance, not being affected by the same weather that would cause a diversion from Perth Airport, and thus being cost-effective to airlines having a closer diversion airfield. In February 2018, it was proposed that Kalgoorlie-Boulder Airport would be a better alternative than Cunderdin.

== See also ==
- List of airports in Western Australia
- Aviation transport in Australia
