= Paraburdoo Airport =

Airport in Western Australia

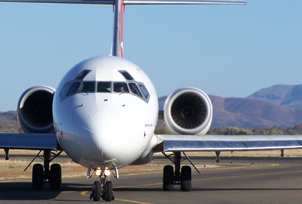
- QantasLink flight arriving at Paraburdoo
- IATA: PBO; ICAO: YPBO

Summary
- Airport type: Public
- Owner: Rio Tinto Group
- Operator: Pilbara Iron
- Serves: Paraburdoo, Western Australia
- Elevation AMSL: 1,406 ft (429 m)
- Coordinates: 23°10′17″S 117°44′44″E

Map
- Location in Western Australia

Runways
Direction	Length		Surface
Direction	m	ft	Surface
06/24	2,132	6,995	Asphalt

Statistics (2010/11)
- Revenue passengers: 205,219
- Aircraft movements: 2,748
- Sources: Australian AIP and aerodrome chart Passenger and aircraft movements from the BITRE

Paraburdoo Airport (IATA: PBO, ICAO: YPBO) is an airport serving Paraburdoo, a town in the Pilbara region of Western Australia. The airport is located 9.3 kilometres (5.8 mi) northeast of Paraburdoo. It also serves the town of Tom Price, with bus services completing the extra 71 kilometres (44 mi) to Tom Price.

The airport is owned by Rio Tinto Group and operated by Pilbara Iron. Paraburdoo's primary air traffic is made up by a mixture of Qantas and Virgin Australia flights, as well as general aviation light aircraft. Qantas operates 32 direct flights weekly to and from Perth. Virgin Australia operate two Perth direct flights per week, with two closed charter flights weekly to Carnarvon and Geraldton.

== Runways ==
- Runway: 06/24
- Dimensions: 2,132 m × 45 m (6,995 ft × 148 ft)
- Surface: Asphalt
- True heading: 245.0
- Latitude: 23° 10' 02.54" S
- Longitude: 117° 45' 22.97" E
- Elevation: 1,406 ft (429 m)
- Slope: -0.4°
- Landing distance: 6,995 ft (2,132 m)
- Takeoff distance: 6,995 ft (2,132 m)

== Lighting System ==
- Pilot Controlled Lighting (PCL)
- Low Intensity Runway Lights (LIRL)
- Precision Approach Path Indicator (PAPI)
- Portable

== Airlines and destinations ==
Airlines	Destinations
QantasLink Network Aviation	Perth
Virgin Australia Regional Airlines	Busselton Geraldton Charter

== Incidents ==
- On 17 June 2007, a twin-engine charter aircraft had a fault with its landing gear and was forced to circle for over two hours before making an emergency landing on Paraburdoo's runway. The incident required a cleanup of the runway as well as cranes to remove the aircraft. A QantasLink Boeing 717 from Perth to Paraburdoo was forced to divert to Newman Airport.

== Statistics ==
Paraburdoo Airport was ranked 34th in Australia for the number of revenue passengers served in financial year 2010–2011.

Annual passenger and aircraft statistics for Paraburdoo
Year	Revenue passengers	Aircraft movements
2001-02	49,134	1,218
2002-03	56,556	1,258
2003-04	61,717	1,255
2004-05	70,343	1,285
2005-06	87,798	1,331
2006-07	101,428	1,290
2007-08	114,157	1,551
2008-09	130,298	1,767
2009-10	145,076	2,140
2010-11	205,219	2,748

== See also ==
- List of airports in Western Australia
- Aviation transport in Australia
