= Jundee Airport =

- IATA: QBS; ICAO: YJUN

Summary
- Airport type: Private
- Operator: Newmont Yandal Operations
- Location: Jundee Gold Mine
- Elevation AMSL: 1,845 ft (562 m)
- Coordinates: 26°25′18″S 120°34′36″E

Map
- Location in Western Australia

Runways
Direction	Length		Surface
Direction	m	ft	Surface
08/26	2,095	6,873
- Sources: Australian AIP and aerodrome chart

Jundee Airport (IATA: QBS, ICAO: YJUN) is located 3.75 nautical miles (6.95 km; 4.32 mi) south of Jundee Gold Mine, in the Mid West region of Western Australia.

The airport is serviced by Skippers Aviation charter flights from Perth Airport for the Jundee Gold Mine.

== Airlines and destinations ==
=== Passenger ===
Airlines	Destinations
Virgin Australia	Perth

== See also ==
- List of airports in Western Australia
- Aviation transport in Australia
