= Learmonth Airport =

Airport in Western Australia

- IATA: LEA; ICAO: YPLM

Summary
- Airport type: Civil aviation
- Owner: Department of Defence
- Operator: Shire of Exmouth
- Serves: Exmouth, Western Australia
- Elevation AMSL: 19 ft / 6 m
- Coordinates: 22°14′09″S 114°05′19″E
- Website: Learmonth Airport

Map
- Location in Western Australia

Runways
Direction	Length		Surface
Direction	m	ft	Surface
18/36	3,047	9,997	Asphalt/concrete

Statistics (2012/13)
- Passengers: 90,861
- Aircraft movements: 1,938
- Sources: Australian AIP and aerodrome chart Passenger and aircraft movements from the Bureau of Infrastructure & Transport Research Economics

Learmonth Airport (IATA: LEA, ICAO: YPLM) is an airport, co-located on the site of RAAF Base Learmonth, a Royal Australian Air Force (RAAF) base. The airport is located near the town of Exmouth on the north-west coast of Western Australia.

Established in the 1940s as an airfield, the current airport is operated by the Shire of Exmouth under a lease from the Department of Defence and occupies an area of 23.9 hectares (59 acres) on the RAAF Base Learmonth site. The terminal opened on 3 December 1999.

On 7 October 2008, Qantas Flight 72 made an emergency landing at RAAF Learmonth. On 1 June 2012, an AirAsia X flight to Perth made an emergency landing at Learmonth Airport for refuelling. Learmonth is designated an emergency alternative airport in the case of fog or bad weather affecting Perth Airport.

In October 2023, CPB Contractors was awarded a contract to upgrade the airport.

== Airlines and destinations ==
Airlines	Destinations
QantasLink	Perth

== Statistics ==
Learmonth Airport was ranked 49th in Australia for the number of revenue passengers served in 2012/13.

Annual passenger and aircraft statistics for Learmonth
Year	Revenue passengers	Aircraft movements
2001-02	13,498	742
2002-03	17,428	986
2003-04	18,840	751
2004-05	25,374	859
2005-06	30,292	884
2006-07	36,840	1,052
2007-08	44,674	1,390
2008-09	43,210	1,260
2009-10	45,667	1,264
2010-11	55,759	1,429
2011-12	87,260	1,667
2012-13	90,861	1,938
