= Koodaideri Mine Airport =

- IATA: OOD; ICAO: YKDD

Summary
- Serves: Gudai-Darri Iron Ore Project
- Location: Pilbara, Western Australia
- Elevation AMSL: 1,473 ft (449 m)
- Coordinates: 22°30′15″S 119°04′37″E
- Interactive map of Koodaideri Mine Airport

Runways
Direction	Length		Surface
Direction	m	ft	Surface
12/30	2,320	7,612	Asphalt

Koodaideri Mine Airport (IATA: OOD, ICAO: YKDD) is located at Gudai-Darri Iron Ore Project, in the Pilbara region of Western Australia.

== Airlines and destinations ==
Airlines	Destinations
Virgin Australia	Charter: Busselton, Perth

== See also ==
- List of airports in Western Australia
- Aviation transport in Australia
