= Barimunya Airport =

Airport in Western Australia

- IATA: BYP; ICAO: YBRY

Summary
- Airport type: Private
- Operator: Barimunya Joint Venture
- Serves: Barimunya, Western Australia, Australia
- Elevation AMSL: 2,082 ft (635 m)
- Coordinates: 22°40′26″S 119°09′58″E

Map
- Location of the airport in Western Australia

Runways
Direction	Length		Surface
Direction	m	ft	Surface
10L/28R	1,940	6,365	Asphalt
- Sources: Australian AIP and aerodrome chart, STV

Barimunya Airport (IATA: BYP, ICAO: YBRY) is located at Barimunya, in the Pilbara region of Western Australia and is approximately 8.25 km (5.13 mi) northeast of the Yandi mine.

== History ==
Construction of Barimunya Airport took place in 2003, led by McMahon Services. Boundaries WA was contracted for the installation of five kilometres of perimeter fencing. Due to the rocky environment, a drill rig was used to excavate post holes. Following the project, the company developed new systems to handle similar conditions for future projects.

== Airlines and destinations ==
=== Passenger ===
Airlines	Destinations
Alliance Airlines	Perth

== See also ==
- List of airports in Western Australia
- Aviation transport in Australia
