= Perth Airport =

Airport in Perth, Western Australia

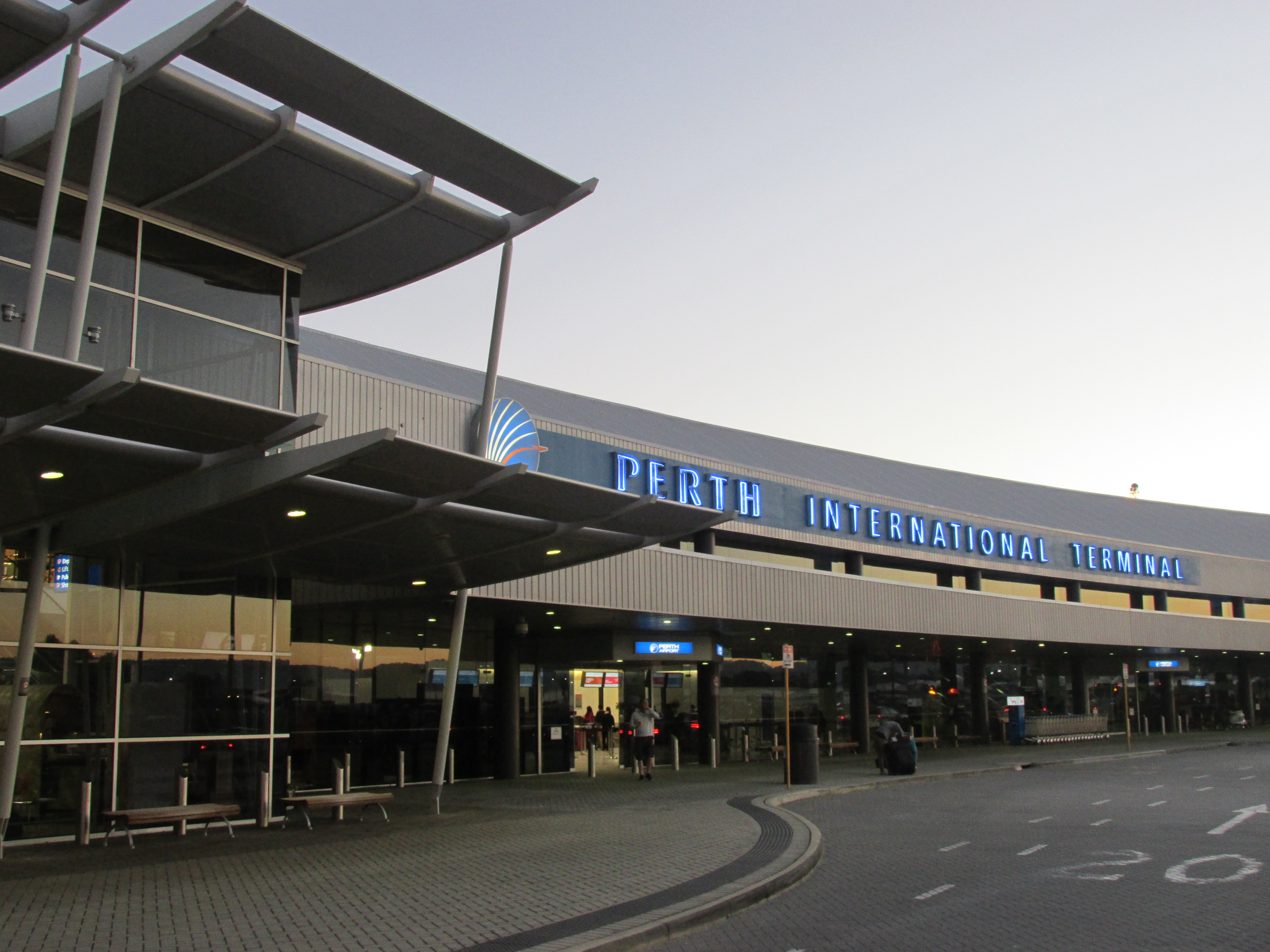
- Terminal 1 in 2015
- IATA: PER; ICAO: YPPH; WMO: 94610

Summary
- Airport type: Public
- Owner: Future Fund (30%); Utilities Trust of Australia (23%); AustralianSuper (17%)
- Operator: Perth Airport Pty Ltd
- Serves: Perth metropolitan region
- Location: Perth Airport
- Hub for: Qantas; Virgin Australia; Virgin Australia Regional Airlines
- Operating base for: Alliance Airlines Kalgoorlie; Jetstar; National Jet Express; Network Aviation; Skippers Aviation
- Elevation AMSL: 67 ft (20 m)
- Coordinates: 31°56′24″S 115°57′54″E
- Website: www.perthairport.com.au

Map
- Interactive map of Perth Airport

Runways
| Direction | Length | | Surface |
| Direction | m | ft | Surface |
|---|---|---|---|
| 03/21 | 3,444 | 11,299 | Asphalt |
| 06/24 | 2,163 | 7,096 | Asphalt |

Statistics (2025/2026)
- Total passengers: 18,387,884
- Domestic passengers: 6,219,158
- Regional passengers: 6,614,595
- International passengers: 5,554,131
- Aircraft movements: 167,420
- Source: Perth Airport - Corporate

Perth Airport (IATA: PER, ICAO: YPPH) is an international, domestic and general aviation airport serving Perth, Western Australia. It is one of five airports within the Perth metropolitan area, the fourth busiest airport in Australia measured by passenger movements, and falls within the boundaries of the cities of Belmont, Kalamunda and Swan in the east of the Perth metropolitan area. It is the sole airport with regular international flights in Western Australia.

Perth Airport covers a total of 2,105 hectares (5,202 acres) of airport property. The airport been operated by Perth Airport Pty Ltd since 1997 under a 99-year lease from the federal government. It is served by Airport Central railway station on Transperth's Airport line.

== Location ==
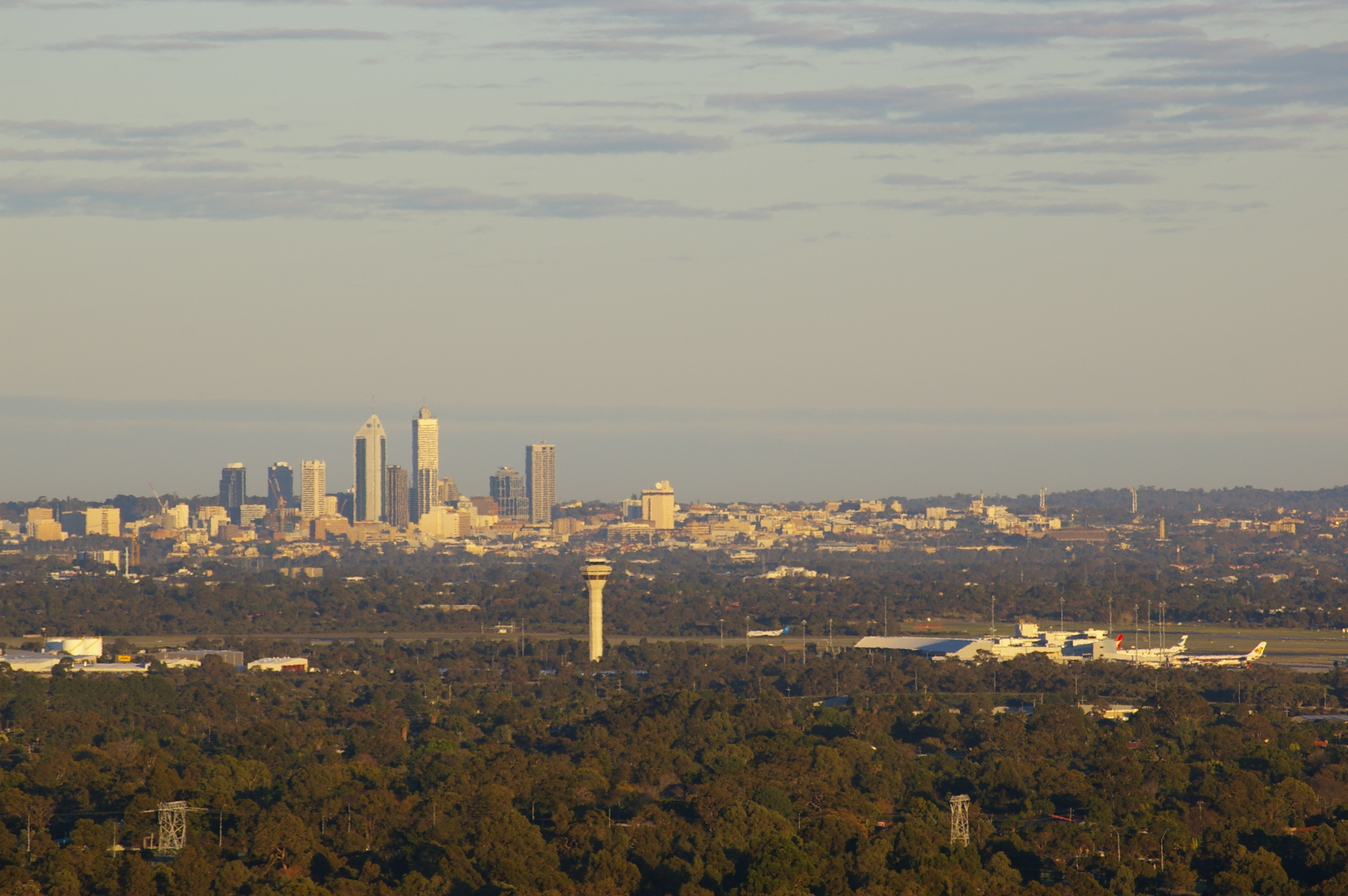
Perth Airport with city centre behind, image taken from the Darling Scarp looking west

The airport is located approximately 10 km (6 mi) east of the Perth central business district. It is one of three civilian airports within the Perth metropolitan area, the others being Jandakot Airport and Rottnest Island Airport. Besides the civilian airports, there are also two military airports within the Perth metropolitan area. The larger of the two is RAAF Base Pearce, 30 km (19 mi) to the north of Perth Airport, at Bullsbrook. The other is 42 km (26 mi) south-west of Perth Airport, and is a part of the military base of HMAS Stirling on Garden Island.

Perth Airport is located on Aboriginal traditional Whadjak-Noongar country.

== Growth and impact ==
As well as passenger movements however, complaints about the impact of the airport on the residents of Perth have grown. The City of Canning, one area that is affected, accepts that "aircraft noise is an important issue" and that "[it] does impact heavily on those suburbs under the flightpaths". Another affected area, the City of Swan, "has experienced significant issues". Indeed, planning policy adopted by the Government of Western Australia recognises that some aircraft noise is "not compatible with residential or educational" land use, two fundamental uses of land in any conurbation that is home to over two million residents – such as Greater Perth.

== History ==
=== Early days ===
Prior to the opening of the Perth Airport, civilian air services for the city were provided from Maylands Aerodrome as well as on the city's foreshore at Langley Park. By the end of the 1930s, it became clear that the Maylands Aerodrome was limited in the size and speed of aircraft it was able to handle thus causing them to seek an alternative site for a future airport.

Site selection and preparation of the original plans was undertaken by NM Fricker of the Department of Civil Aviation. In 1938, land was selected and purchased for the new aerodrome. The site selected in what was at the time Guildford, was an area of land granted by Governor James Stirling to local man John Scott, which later became the long disused Dunreath Golf Course.

A plaque located on a roadside wall of the old International terminal remains in permanent memory of Scott:

Perth Airport stands on part of an area granted originally by Governor James Stirling to John Scott. A yeoman farmer from Lanarkshire, Scotland who arrived in Western Australia in March 1831, after a voyage of about 90 days in the schooner Eliza of 343 tons. He came at the invitation of the governor, to establish and maintain a bloodstock farm for the colony. He made his home near Guildford, using the Swan River to reach the farm in this area.

In recognition of his services Governor Stirling granted him lease of an area at Bunbury, where he became the first settler in 1838.

Remember him as one who helped to bring prosperity to this land.

— Roadside plaque in memory of John Scott

=== Military operations ===
Even before civil aviation operations could commence at the new site, the onset of World War II saw the facility being redesigned for military purposes as a temporary base for the Royal Australian Air Force and United States Navy, known as RAAF Station Guildford, primarily to supplement RAAF Base Pearce. Royal Australian Air Force No. 85 Squadron was based there from February 1943.

Despite military use of the airfield, civil services operated by Qantas Empire Airways and Australian National Airways (ANA) commenced from the location in 1944. This was despite bitter protest from military authorities who felt civilian operations would undermine the defence and camouflage needs of the location.

The move was agreed to by the government, as the larger types of aircraft of the day being operated by the two airlines could simply not be handled at Maylands, notwithstanding the small grass airfield, lack of passenger facilities, and approaches being difficult due to surrounding industrial infrastructure. Using Douglas DC-3 aircraft, ANA flew the first commercial service from the aerodrome to Adelaide. On 17 June 1944, Qantas made its inaugural flight to Ceylon via Exmouth using a modified Consolidated B-24 Liberator, arriving in Perth on 3 June 1944 having been released to the airline by the British Government.

=== Early civilian operations ===
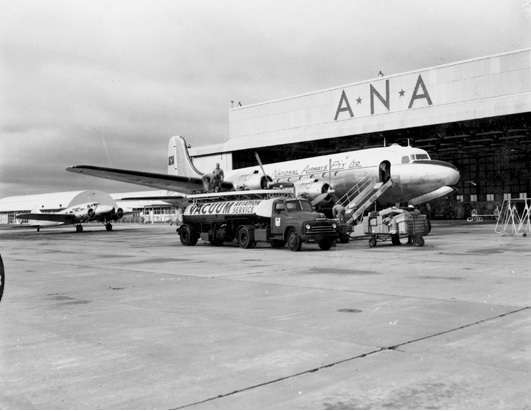
An Australian National Airways Douglas DC-4 refuelling at Perth Airport in 1955

Full civilian operations at the Guildford Aerodrome commenced in 1944. Civil operations at Maylands continued albeit reduced until 30 June 1963, when the airport closed and its function as a secondary airport was taken over by Jandakot Airport the very next day.

Guildford Aerodrome was at best only a basic airfield. On a large open airfield with plenty of space, an unobtrusive control tower was hidden away amongst a collection of buildings inherited from the wartime operations at the site. The Department of Civil Aviation inherited a large number of operating vehicles from the former military occupants, including an assortment of vehicles including (Ford or Chevrolet) Blitz wagons, Dodge command cars and weapon carriers, large trucks and various makes of fire tenders, jeeps and ambulances. Boarding aircraft at Guildford was described as being a bit like boarding a bus given the lack of passenger facilities at the time.

In 1948, the Horrie Miller owned MacRobertson Miller Airlines relocated from Maylands to Guildford. followed by newly formed government airline Trans Australia Airlines (TAA) on 2 December of that same year, operating Douglas C-54 Skymasters on its Perth – Melbourne – Sydney route. Due to the lack of road transportation across the Nullarbor Plain, it was at this time that Guildford became the scene of very busy cargo operations. Fresh fruit, vegetables and manufactured goods were being flown from east to west and back again.

The airport was granted international status in September 1952, and renamed from Guildford Aerodrome to Perth Airport in March 1953. Officiated by the Federal Minister for Civil Aviation, Hubert Anthony, the official ceremony for the renaming took place on the main apron in front of a converted Bellman hangar used by TAA as its passenger terminal. At the time, a new international terminal building was under construction but had not been completed in time for the ceremony. This new terminal was being constructed using steel and cladding recycled from American-built military quonset buildings being dismantled and shipped over from Manus Island.

It was also on this day that Qantas commenced its Wallaby service using Lockheed Constellations from Sydney to South Africa via Perth, the Cocos Islands and Mauritius.

=== The jet age ===
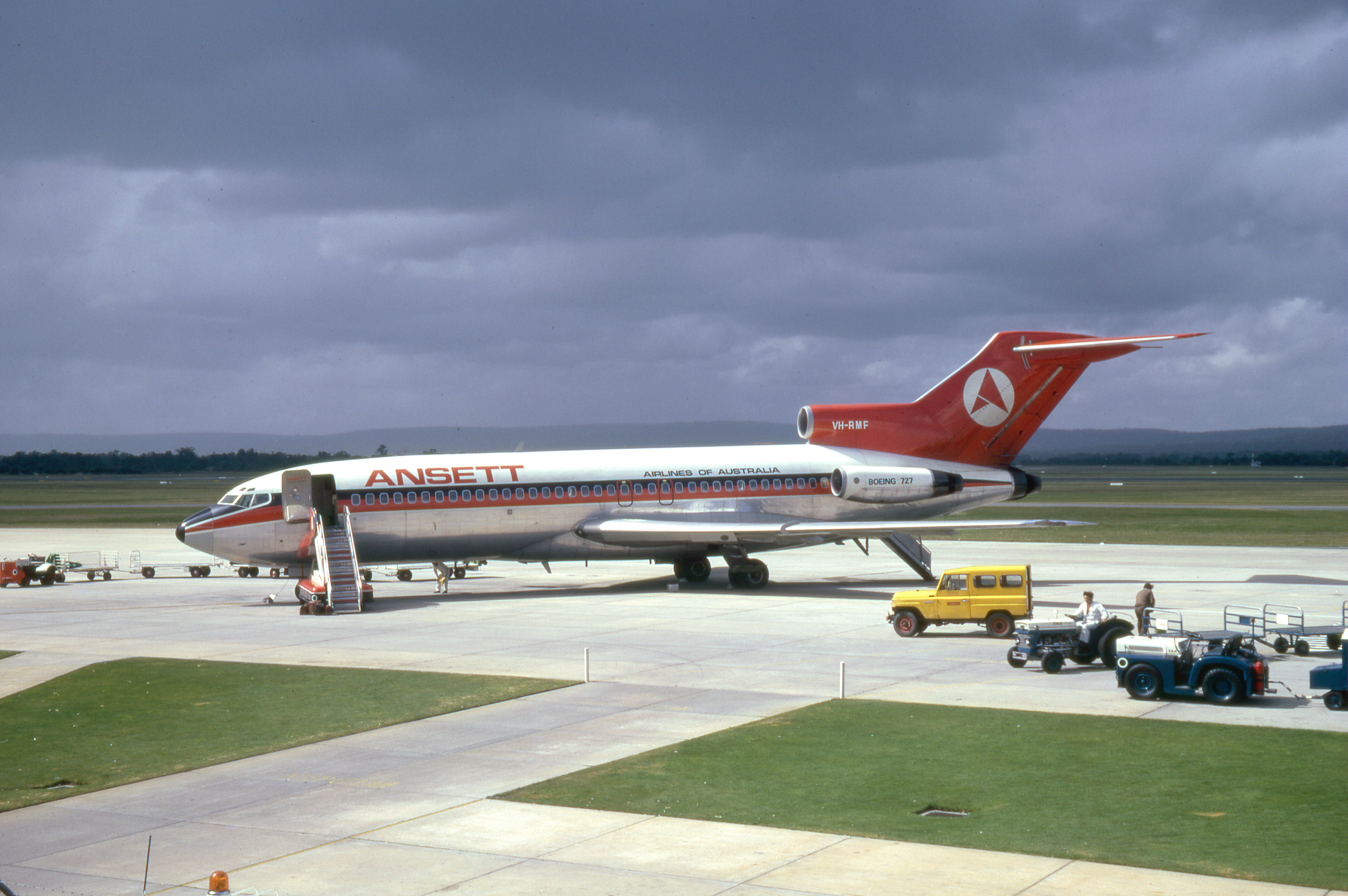
Ansett Boeing 727-100 at Perth Airport in 1971

Towards the mid-1950s, airline travel was still being used by only a small percentage of the population. At that time, only 8% of the population had ever flown, but as the marketplace evolved, so did the types of people and their reasons for flying.

It was at this time the airport began to experience the full effects of the jet age. Both Air India and Qantas commenced operating Boeing 707s in the mid to late 1950s from Perth to Singapore and the subcontinent. As the aircraft of the day grew faster more demanding due to their sophistication, facilities at the airport continued to improve to accommodate them. By the mid-1960s the airport was serving its first domestic pure jet engine aircraft, commencing with a Boeing 727 in 1964, and the Douglas DC-9 in 1967, both types operated by TAA and Ansett ANA. It was at this time that the airport was one of the few major airports in the country which operated without curfews, and due to the increased number and frequency of flights operating from the airport it gave birth to what was then referred to as the midnight horror or red-eye special, known in more recent history as the red-eye flight.

=== Demise of the hangar terminals ===
In 1960, the then international terminal previously constructed from steel and cladding from Manus Island was dismantled and re-erected in the suburb of Cannington. Known as the Alco building, it was re-designed for use as a commercial facility.

The removal of the steel structure made way for the construction of an entirely new combined domestic and international passenger terminal, constructed on the northern side of the airfield. It was in 1962 that airlines were able to move from their hangars into a new combined passenger terminal, designed by the Commonwealth Department of Works and opened just in time to handle 1962 British Empire and Commonwealth Games traffic increases. The new combined terminal was opened that same year by then Minister for Civil Aviation, Senator Shane Paltridge; it was built in an area positioned between the present terminals 3 and 4 and is currently used as the crew base for both Qantas and Jetstar, and offices for airlines and support firms.

=== International terminal development ===
From 1962 onwards, both the domestic and international passenger operations at the airport were provided by a single terminal. When it opened, the terminal's facilities included an observation deck, a pond with black swans, and a cocktail lounge named the Orbit Inne, which became popular with locals as it was the only place in Perth that served drinks on Sunday nights. By the arrival of the Boeing 747 on 3 September 1971, the terminal had reached its capacity, and modelling of future passenger numbers showed it would be unable to handle any further increases in passenger demand.

In November 1980, the Federal Transport Minister, Ralph Hunt, announced that a new international terminal would be built in Perth at a cost of A$26 million, equivalent to A$125.6 million in 2022. Design of the new international terminal commenced in 1982, with one of the key principles of the design being the allowance for easy future expansion as the needs of the airport dictated. The project called for the construction of a new terminal, apron, airside roads, access roads, car parks and other passenger facilities.

Construction of the new international terminal and control tower commenced in March 1984 on the south-eastern side of the airfield. In 1984, the road leading to the new terminal, Horrie Miller Drive was named in honour of local aviation pioneer Horrie Miller. The terminal was officially opened on 25 October 1986 by Prime Minister Bob Hawke, with the new terminal receiving passengers just days after. The newly built control tower was the tallest in Australia at the time of its construction, and remains the tallest in Australia.

Upon completion, the terminal was able to process up to five Boeing 747 aircraft per hour and accommodated a peak passenger volume of 6,000 passengers per hour. Twenty years later, in the 12 months to June 2006 the terminal processed over 2.027 million passengers, surpassing a 1996 projection of 1.016 million passengers in that period.

=== 1988–2018: Growth and expansion ===
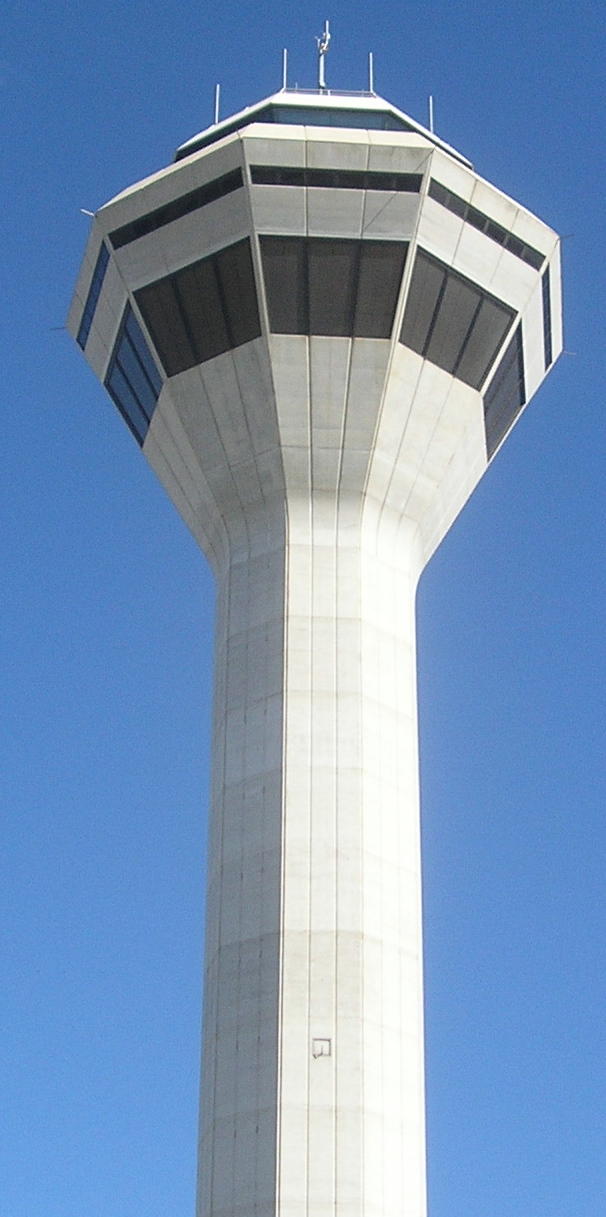
The airport control tower, built in 1987

In the late 1980s the Federal Government, as a prelude to eventual privatisation, formed the Federal Airports Corporation (FAC). In 1988, the FAC took over as manager of Perth Airport (and many other Australian airports).

It was also during this time that Australian Airlines (now Qantas domestic) and Ansett both set about building their own domestic terminals on the northern side of the terminal, where they still stand today as terminal 4 and terminal 3 respectively. Following the collapse of Ansett in 2001, terminal 3 became a multi-user terminal, catering for flights from former Ansett-subsidiary Skywest, as well as Virgin Australia, Tiger Airways Australia, Air Australia and charter airlines including Alliance Airlines.

In July 1997 Perth Airport took up a 99-year lease as part of the Federal Government's push to privatise airports. As at February 2024, Future Fund (30%), Utilities Trust of Australia (23%) and AustralianSuper (17%) were the major shareholders.

From 2003 to 2004, the International terminal underwent major internal refurbishments to provide an increased array of passenger services, including increased space for duty-free stores and food and beverage concession stands. Further upgrades valued at $25 million (2006) were made to the terminal across 2005 and 2006 which added an additional 2,500 m^{2} (27,000 sq ft) of floor space, additional check-in counters, and an improved baggage handling and screening system.

The airport commemorated its 60th anniversary in 2004, with an event that opened the new Taxiway Sierra, a new taxiway supporting larger aircraft such as the Boeing 747, Airbus A340 and Airbus A380.

On 14 October 2008, the Airbus A380 made its first visit to the airport as a part of Qantas' A380 promotional tour around Australia. The second A380 to visit the airport was an Emirates aircraft which made an emergency landing on 15 August 2009, after a passenger on a Dubai to Sydney flight suffered a stroke.

In 2012, the Australian Competition & Consumer Commission (ACCC) released a report rating the Perth Airport as the worst in Australia, as judged by airlines. The same report rated it below satisfactory for the second year in a row. However, due to more recent expansions and projects, the airport was awarded capital city airport of the year by the Australian Airports Association at their national conference in 2016. In 2018, Perth Airport was named the best airport in Australia for overall service quality by the ACCC after the completion of a $1 billion redevelopment project over the span of five years.

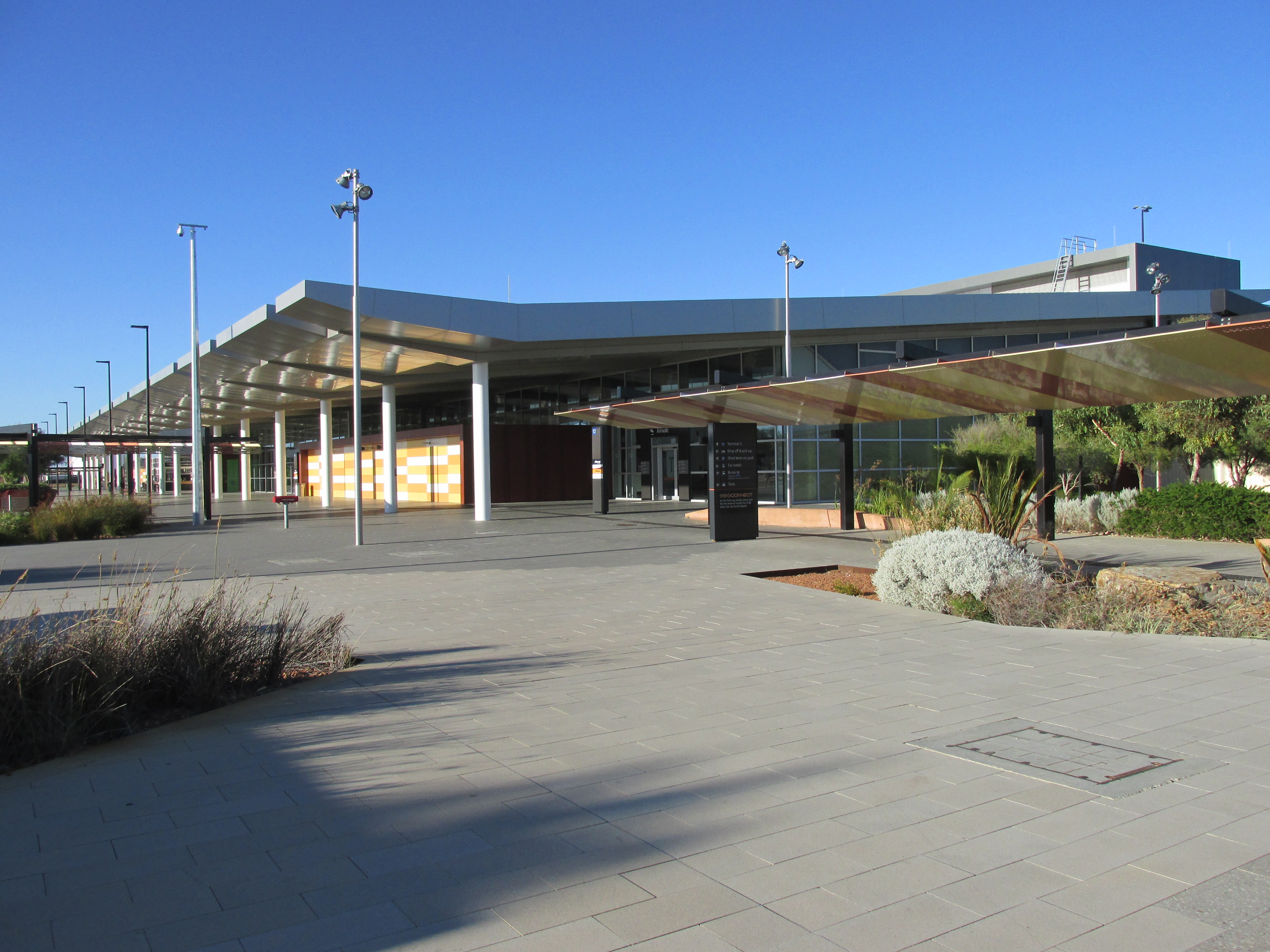
Terminal 2

Catering for regional airlines, terminal 2 was officially opened on 28 February 2013, with the first flights operating out of the terminal from 2 March 2013. The single story terminal features at-grade access to the terminal building and dedicated pick-up and drop-off lanes at the front of the terminal, a centralised passenger security screening zone, three baggage reclaim belts as well 14 aircraft bays, accessible from enclosed walkways and serviced by 8 boarding counters, and 36 additional aircraft parking bays.

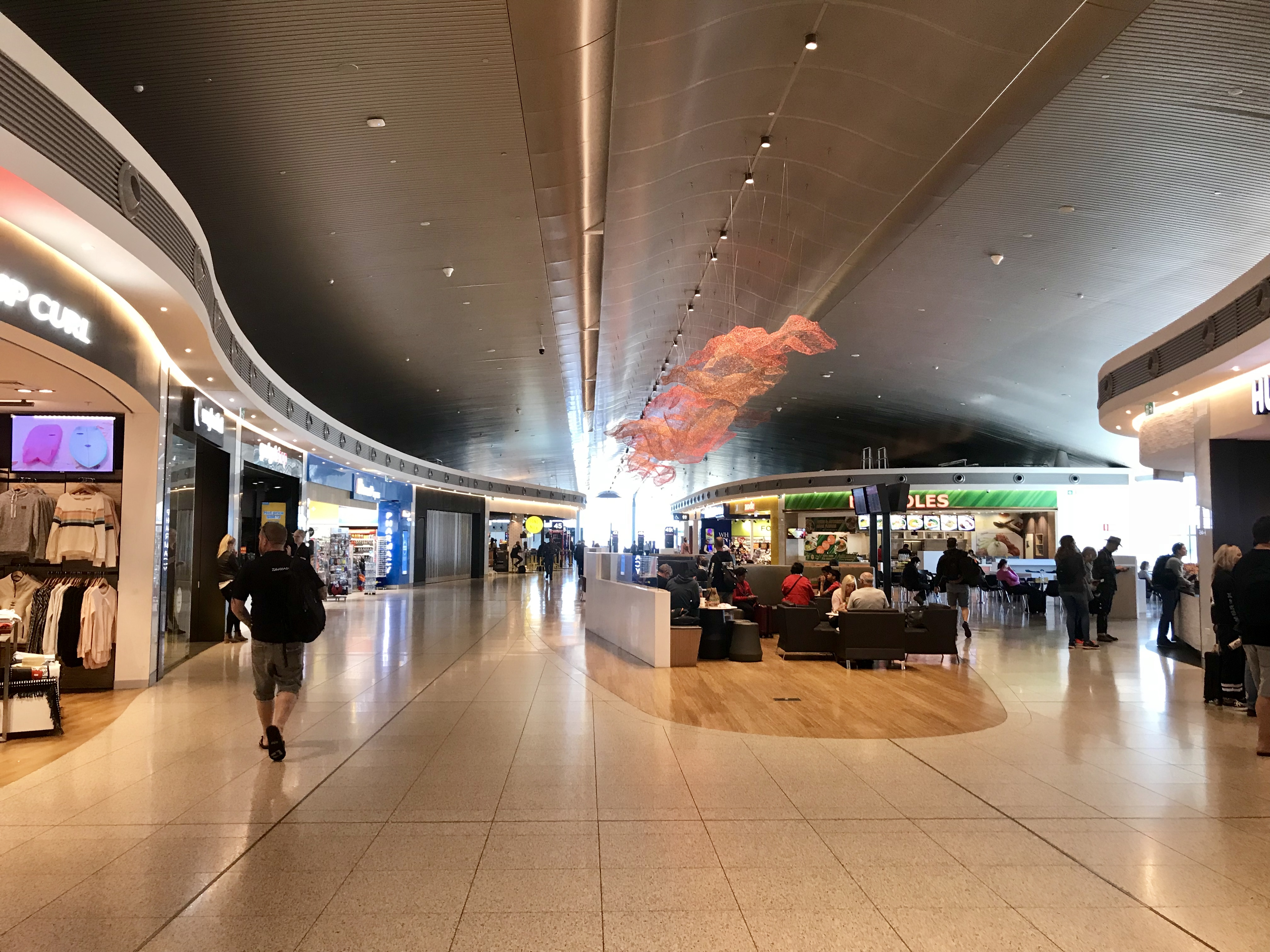
Terminal 1 Domestic Pier

In April 2015, Airport Drive opened, replacing Horrie Miller Drive as the main access road to terminals 1 and 2. The road was part of the wider Gateway WA project to improve access to the airport. That same month works commenced on a $42-million upgrade of the forecourt and the passenger pick-up/drop-off areas in front of terminal 1 to improve access. The upgrade was completed in November 2016.

In May 2015, Emirates commenced the first Airbus A380 service to Perth from Dubai following the completion of a dual level boarding gate, an expanded check-in hall, a refurbished departure area and other expansions to terminal 1 including a new Emirates business class lounge. In August 2017, Emirates replaced its last remaining Emirates Boeing 777-300ER service with an Airbus A380, taking the total Emirates daily services to two. However, this service was replaced by a Boeing 777 in 2020, during the COVID-19 pandemic. On 1 November 2022, the first regular A380 service resumed.

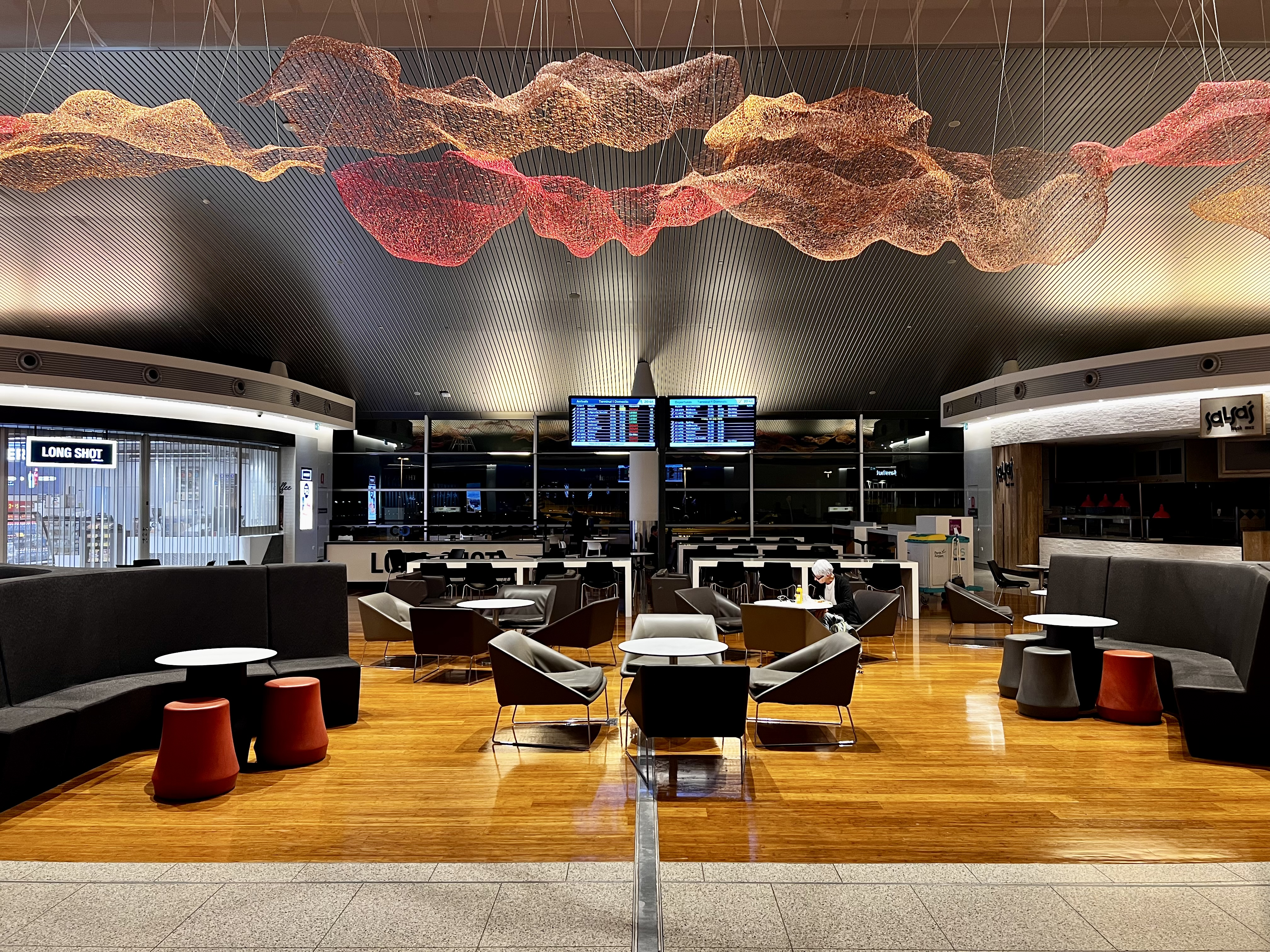
Terminal 1 Domestic Pier at night

On 22 November 2015 the domestic pier of terminal 1 was opened; the pier became the exclusive home to Virgin Australia. With Virgin Australia's partner, Etihad Airways, beginning daily direct services from its hub in Abu Dhabi on 16 July 2014; the pier ensures quick and seamless transfers between the two airlines. The pier is also connected to Terminal 2 via an elevated walkway allowing seamless transfer to Virgin's regional services without having to be re-screened.

On 15 May 2016, the world's largest commercial jet airliner, the Antonov An-225 Mriya landed at Perth Airport, making its first visit to Perth and Australia.

On 3 November 2016, construction of a commuter rail link to the airport was started, with Airport Central station on the Airport line linking the future consolidated terminal precinct with the greater Transperth railway network. The Airport line, which opened on 9 October 2022 and is underground below Perth airport, converges with the Midland line at Bayswater station. Also constructed was a pedestrian "skybridge" linking the station to Terminal 1.

On 11 December 2016, Qantas announced that it would commence non-stop flights from Perth to London Heathrow with one of its newly acquired Boeing 787s. To achieve this the Qantas domestic terminals at terminals 3 and 4 were upgraded during 2017 to cater for international flights. Once completed the existing Qantas flights to Singapore and Auckland also migrated from terminal 1 to terminal 3 and 4, with all Qantas' international flights now departing from terminal 3's international section. Services to London started in March 2018.

In May 2018, Qatar Airways upgraded their Perth-Doha service from the Boeing 777 to the Airbus A380, making them the second airline to begin A380 services to Perth. Although this service was downgraded in 2020 during the COVID-19 pandemic, Qatar Airways would ultimately resume A380 services to Perth in December 2022.

=== 2019–present: Major upgrades and future consolidation ===
Although the airport was closed to many regular international and domestic flights during the course of the COVID-19 pandemic in 2020 and 2021, Perth Airport still handled six million resource workers on fly-in fly-out flights. However, the subdued passenger numbers and a delayed border reopening resulted in a temporary closure of the Terminal 1 domestic pier and a partial closure of Terminal 3 in early 2022.

In June 2022, Qantas began direct flights from Perth to Rome to be operated on a seasonal basis, three times a week; this created Perth Airport's second direct connection to Europe. These services were followed by a direct service to Paris Charles de Gaulle beginning in July 2024, the third connection to Europe.

In May 2024, it was announced that terminals 3 and 4 will receive upgrades to create additional capacity for Qantas services before the airline ultimately moves to a new terminal in the Airport Central precinct in 2031. In addition, domestic Jetstar services moved to terminal 2 from December 2024, before it will rejoin Qantas at the new terminal once it is completed. These upgrades are part of an estimated $5 billion investment in the airport which will fund construction of both the new terminal and a third runway as well as two multi-storey carparks and a hotel in the Airport Central precinct.

The first of the new six-level carparks, designated P1, began construction in mid-2024, opening in November 2026. The existing road network in front of T1 will also be reconfigured, and will see a new dedicated pick-up and drop-off area for passengers as well as lanes for buses, rideshare and taxi services on the ground floor of P1, while the existing road in front of terminal 1 will be closed and converted into a pedestrian plaza.

On 28 June 2024, Rex Airlines commenced operations to Adelaide using Embraer E190s from National Jet Express, and to Melbourne using their own Boeing 737 aircraft. This marked the first time Rex had flown across the country to Perth. These flights were later withdrawn after Rex entered voluntary administration in July 2024.

In October 2024, it was announced that the airport's first hotel would be run by Accor under the Pullman brand. Scheduled to begin construction in 2026, the 240-room hotel will feature a rooftop pool with views of the airfield and an architectural design that echoes aircraft panels. It will also connect to the existing skybridge.

In October 2025, the airport began work on upgrades and expansion of terminal 2 that would double the passenger capacity of the facility.

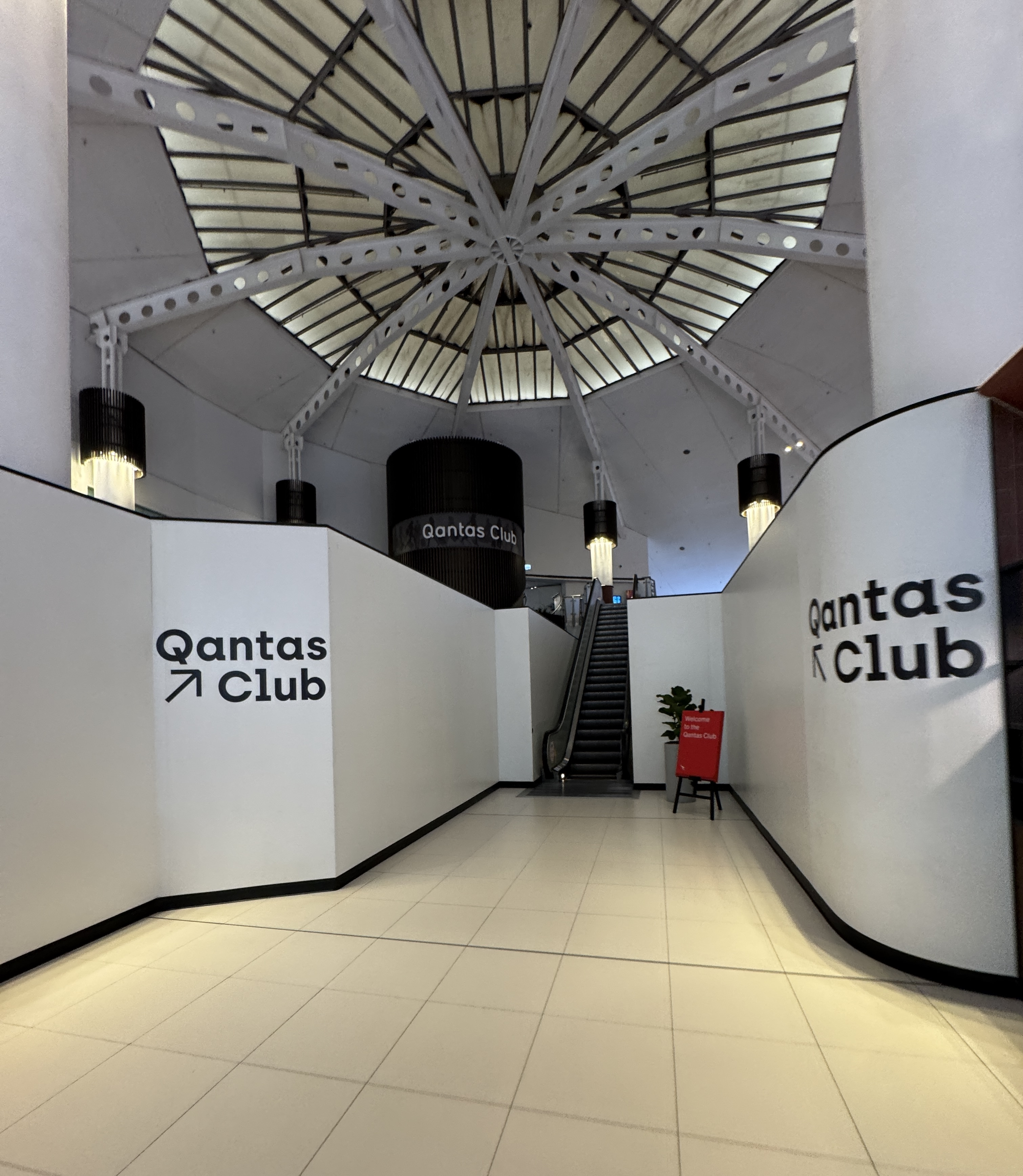
Entry to the Qantas Club T4 2026

In December 2025, the airport officially commenced construction on a third runway (03R/21L). The new runway will be 3,000 metres (9,800 ft) long and 45 metres (148 ft) wide, while running parallel to the existing main runway and located between Terminal 1 and Abernethy Road. The Skyway Consortium, a joint venture between BMD Group and CPB Contractors, will construct the runway with associated taxiways, access roads, lighting and other necessary infrastructure. The construction of the runway will also result in the closure of part of Grogan Road on the Perth Airport estate that intersects the planned runway site. The $1 billion project is slated for completion in 2029.

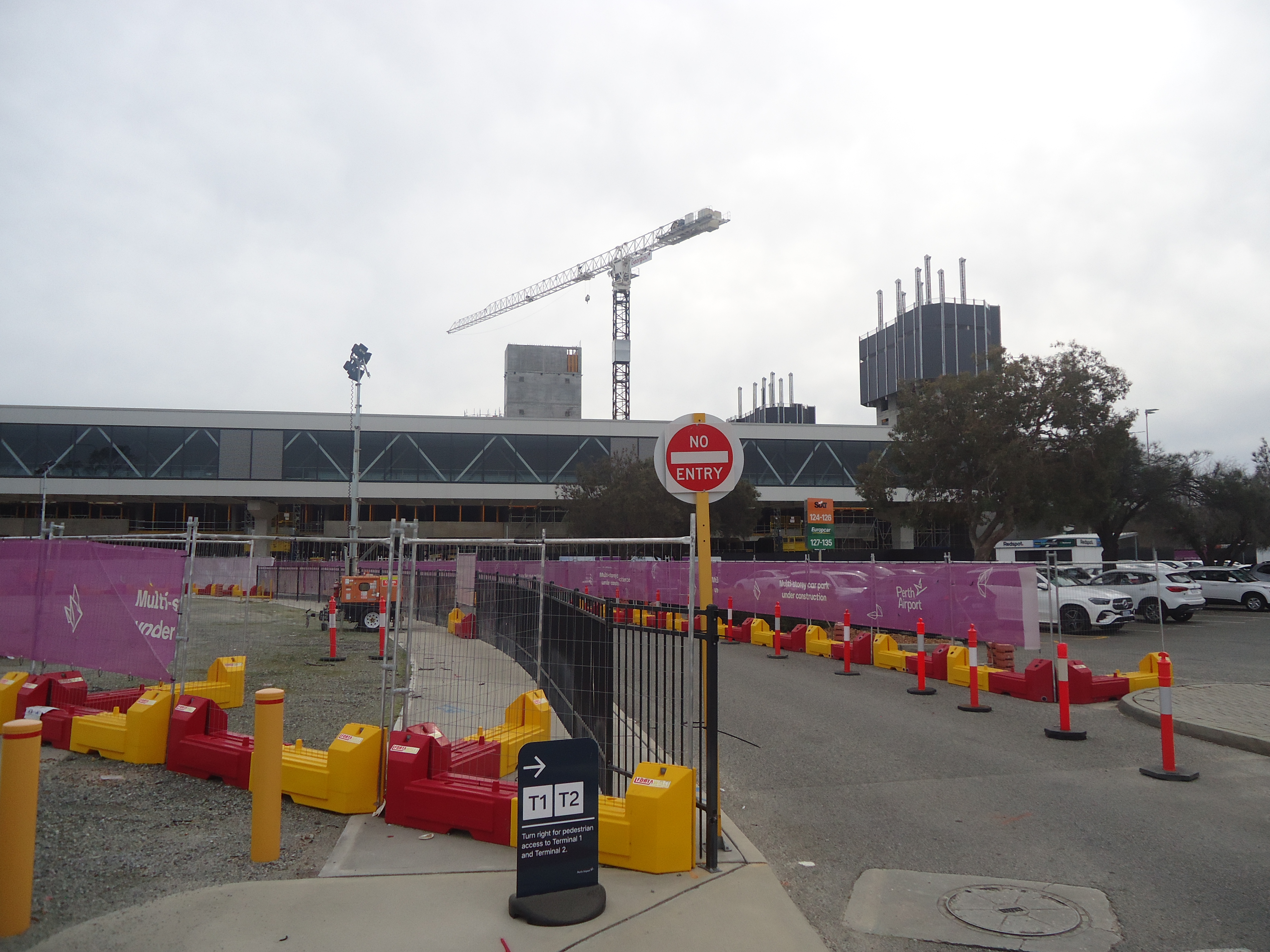
Perth Airport T1 Carpark Under Construction in August 2025

== Facilities and services ==
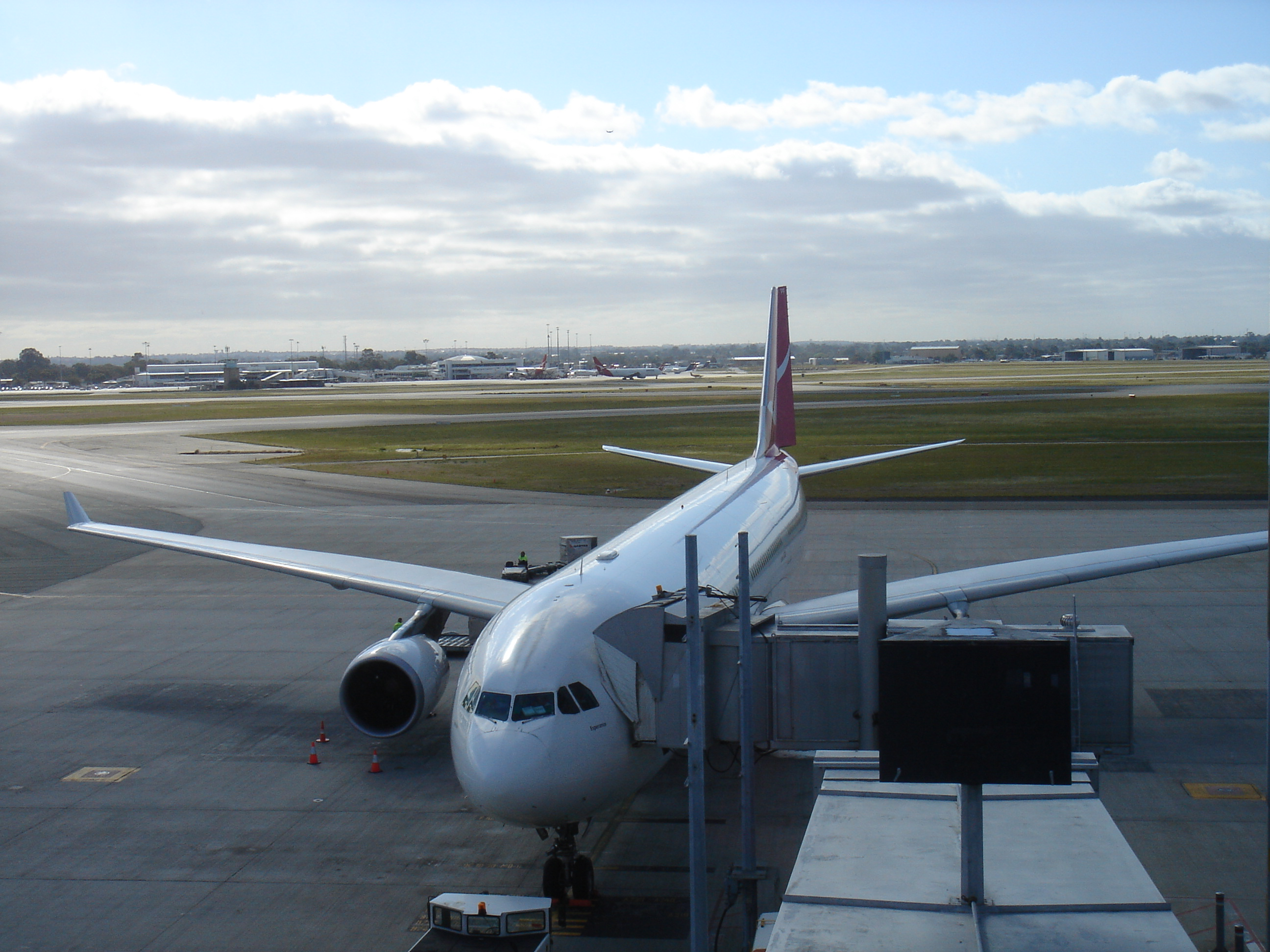
A Qantas Airbus A330-300 docked at Terminal 1. Terminals 3 and 4 are visible in the background.

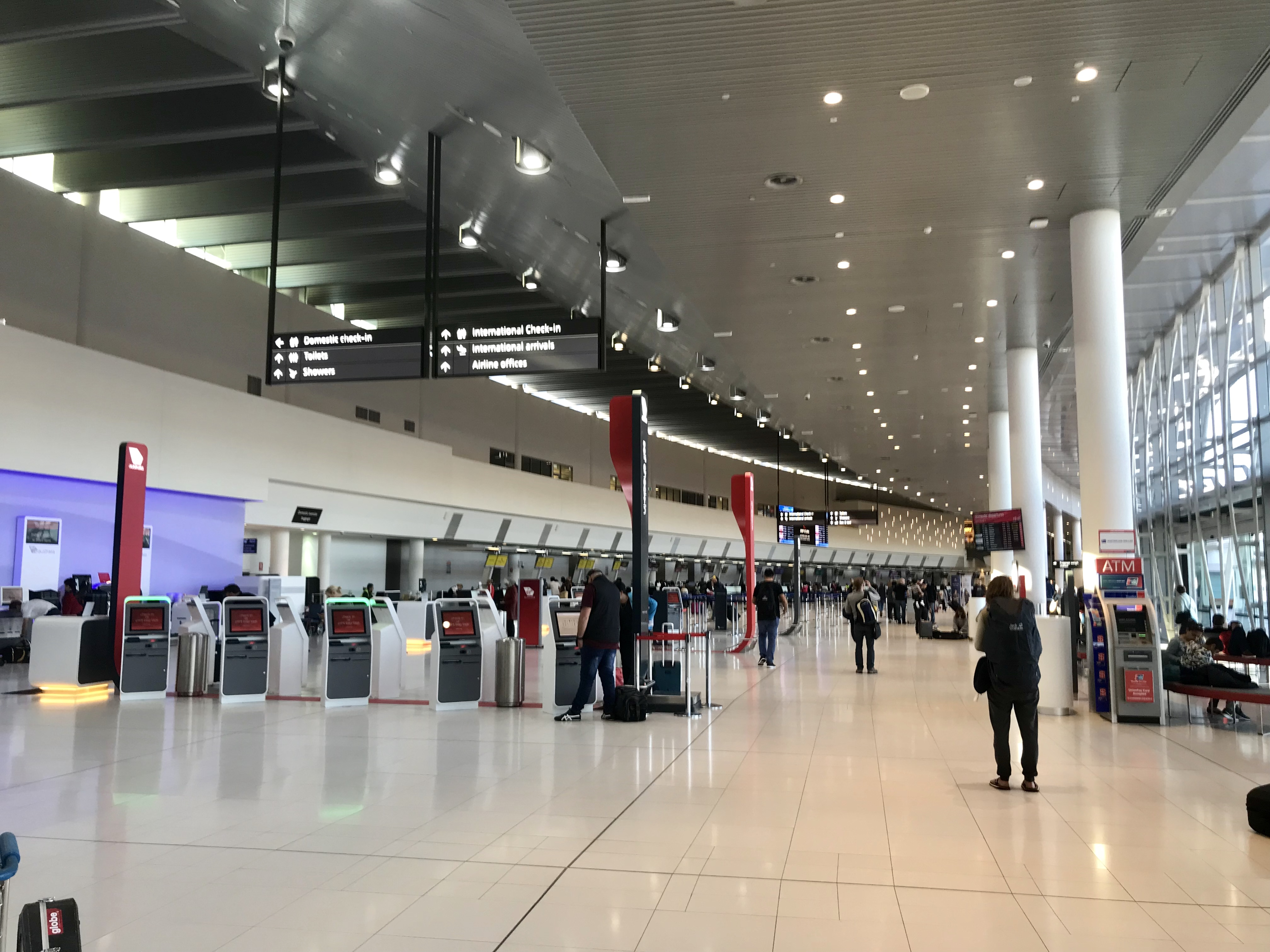
Terminal 1 domestic check-in area

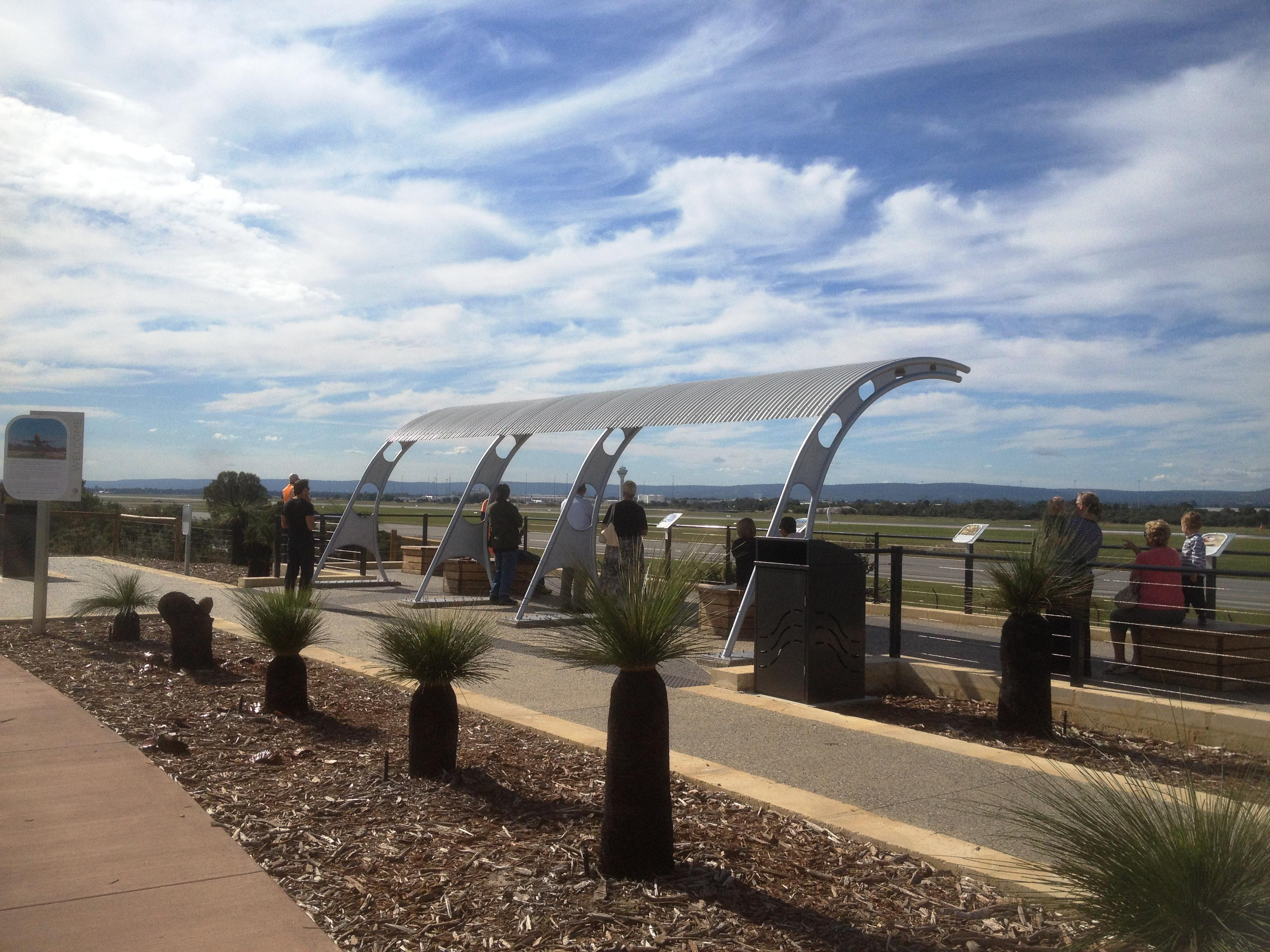
Viewing platform on Dunreath Drive

Perth Airport has five terminals: four main terminals and one minor terminal.

- On the eastern side of the airport (and the location of the future consolidated terminal precinct) are:
  - Terminal 1 (T1), originally known as the International Terminal, caters primarily for flights originating or departing outside Australia, with five jetways and a total of seven gates including a Multi Access Ramp System which allows dual boarding of aircraft including the Boeing 777 and Airbus A380. There are four airline lounges: the Emirates lounge; a Singapore Airlines Silver Kris lounge; the Air New Zealand Lounge and the unaffiliated Aspire Lounge. The Emirates lounge has a second level and offers direct boarding on their flagship Airbus A380 aircraft. In November 2015, a new domestic pier opened at the west end of T1 to service Virgin Australia domestic flights. The domestic pier has eight gates and contains a Virgin Australia lounge. It is connected to T2 by a walkway.
  - Terminal 2 (T2) is located to the immediate south west of T1 and caters primarily for regional services. Virgin Australia Regional and Alliance commenced operations from T2 in 2013 whilst Rex Airlines commenced operations from T2 in 2016. In September 2024, domestic Jetstar services transferred operations from T3 and T4 to T2. The terminal contains an Alliance lounge.
- On the western side of the airport are the remaining terminals; terminals T3 and T4 adjoin each other, with Qantas having exclusive use of both terminals since the movement of Virgin Australia to T1. The Perth Airport Master Plan outlines these two terminals will ultimately be demolished and replaced by a single new terminal east of T1.
  - Terminal 3 (T3) has five jetways and a total of nine gates. It is currently used by Qantas for its domestic and international flights; for this latter purpose the terminal has been outfitted with customs and immigration facilities, and contains an international arrivals concourse. T3 contains the Qantas International lounge.
  - Terminal 4 (T4) has four jetways and a total of nine gates and is dedicated to the domestic operations of Qantas and QantasLink. The terminal also facilitates check in for Qantas' international services. It has two member lounges: The Qantas Club, which was expanded in March 2013 to cater for an additional 140 passengers; and the Qantas Domestic Business Lounge, which opened in 2014.
  - There is also a general aviation terminal to the north of T3 and T4 simply called General Aviation that is used primarily by some charter aircraft and for mining companies with fly-in fly-out services, with Jandakot airport also serving that function.

=== Runways ===
Flights are serviced by two runways – the main 03/21 runway, 3,444 m × 45 m (11,299 ft × 148 ft) and 06/24, 2,163 m × 45 m (7,096 ft × 148 ft).

In 1965, Runway 03/21 was extended from 7,500 ft (2,286 m) to 10,000 ft (3,048 m) to accommodate Boeing 707s.

After a 10-month project, a reconstructed cross runway was opened on 21 October 2005. The upgrades involved significant strengthening works and enlargement of turning nodes to accommodate regular operations by wide bodied aircraft, including the Airbus A380.

=== Meteorological services ===
Meteorological services for Perth Airport commenced in May 1944, provided by the Guildford Meteorological Office situated at Ivy Street, Redcliffe.

In March 1988, surface observations were moved to the recently vacated old airport tower on the northern side of the airfield (near what is now Terminal 3). The Ivy Street location was retained for a time for radar services and the launching and tracking of weather balloons. In October 1997, all operations from the Ivy Street Office and Old Control Tower were transferred to a newly constructed office on the Northern Perimeter Road in Belmont, in the north-eastern corner of the airfield.

=== Landing patterns and approach ===
Perth Airport resides within the Melbourne FIR, which is managed by Melbourne Centre and operated by Airservices Australia.

=== Observation areas ===
There are two dedicated spotting areas at Perth Airport. Terminal T1 has an Observation Deck on level 3 to view departing and arriving aircraft. It has vending machines and flight information displays.

The second spotting area is to the west side opposing the threshold of Runway 03 located along Dunreath Drive. The public viewing area has a shelter in the shape of the body section of a Boeing 747, and displays of information about the history of aviation.

== Airlines and destinations ==
Perth Airport is served by 30 scheduled airlines flying to over 50 destinations in Australia, Oceania, Asia, Africa and Europe. A total of 1258 scheduled domestic and regional flights arrive and depart from Perth Airport each week. A total of 213 scheduled international flights arrive and depart from Perth Airport each week.

=== Passenger ===
| Airlines | Destinations |
|---|---|
| Air Mauritius | Mauritius |
| Air New Zealand | Auckland; Seasonal: Christchurch (resumes 30 November 2026) |
| AirAsia | Kuala Lumpur–International |
| Airnorth | Alice Springs, Kununurra |
| All Nippon Airways | Tokyo–Narita |
| Alliance Airlines | Barimunya, Bellevue, Cape Preston, Conndewanna, Kalgoorlie, Kununurra, Laverton, Leinster, Leonora, Telfer, The Granites |
| Batik Air | Denpasar, Jakarta–Soekarno-Hatta |
| Batik Air Malaysia | Denpasar, Kuala Lumpur–International |
| Cathay Pacific | Hong Kong |
| China Southern Airlines | Guangzhou |
| Emirates | Dubai–International |
| Indonesia AirAsia | Denpasar |
| Jetstar | Adelaide, Bangkok–Suvarnabhumi, Brisbane, Cairns, Denpasar, Gold Coast, Manila, Melbourne, Phuket, Singapore, Sydney–Kingsford Smith; Seasonal: Christchurch |
| Malaysia Airlines | Kuala Lumpur–International |
| National Jet Express | Charter: Barrow Island, Jundee, Kalgoorlie, Kambalda, Laverton, Meekatharra, Murrin Murrin, Nifty, Plutonic, Ravensthrorpe, Sunrise Dam, Tropicana, Woodie Woodie |
| Nexus Airlines | Geraldton, Kalgoorlie |
| Philippine Airlines | Manila |
| Qantas | Adelaide, Auckland, Brisbane, Broome, Canberra, Jakarta–Soekarno-Hatta (resumes 14 December 2026), Johannesburg–O. R. Tambo, London–Heathrow, Melbourne, Paris–Charles de Gaulle, Singapore, Sydney–Kingsford Smith; Seasonal: Rome–Fiumicino |
| QantasLink | Broome, Christmas Island, Cocos (Keeling) Islands, Cloudbreak, Darwin, Eliwana Camp, Exmouth (Learmonth), Geraldton, Kalgoorlie, Karratha, Newcastle, Newman, Onslow, Paraburdoo, Port Hedland; Seasonal: Hobart |
| Qatar Airways | Doha |
| Rex Airlines | Albany, Carnarvon, Esperance, Monkey Mia |
| Scoot | Singapore |
| Singapore Airlines | Singapore |
| Skippers Aviation | Laverton, Leonora, Meekatharra, Mount Magnet, Wiluna |
| South African Airways | Johannesburg–O.R. Tambo |
| Thai Airways International | Bangkok–Suvarnabhumi |
| TransNusa | Denpasar |
| VietJet Air | Ho Chi Minh City |
| Vietnam Airlines | Ho Chi Minh City |
| Virgin Australia | Adelaide, Brisbane, Broome, Darwin, Doha (resumes 9 December 2026), Hobart, Kalgoorlie, Karratha, Koodaiaderi Mine, Kununurra, Leonora, Melbourne, Newman, Onslow, Port Hedland, Sydney–Kingsford Smith |
| Virgin Australia Regional Airlines | Barimunya, Boolgeeda, Broome, Busselton, Conndewanna, Darwin, Geraldton, Gruyere, Jundee, Kalgoorlie, Karratha, Kununurra, Newman, Onslow, Port Hedland, West Angelas |

Qantas operates dedicated 'flightseeing' services over Antarctica from Perth. These flights, using a Boeing 787 Dreamliner, depart Perth from Terminals 3 and 4, and provide a guided aerial tour of Antarctica before returning to Australia. These flights are about thirteen hours in total.

As of 2026, the Jetstar services between Perth Airport and Gold Coast Airport were the longest point to point scheduled domestic flights in Australia.

=== Cargo ===
| Airlines | Destinations |
|---|---|
| My Indo Airlines | Jakarta–Soekarno-Hatta |
| Qantas Freight | Adelaide, Hong Kong, Melbourne, Sydney–Kingsford Smith, Sydney–Western |

== Traffic and statistics ==
=== Total ===
The total passengers using the airport has increased on average by 2.5% annually since 1998 to 2022, with 78% of passenger traffic at the airport attributed to domestic travel in 2022.

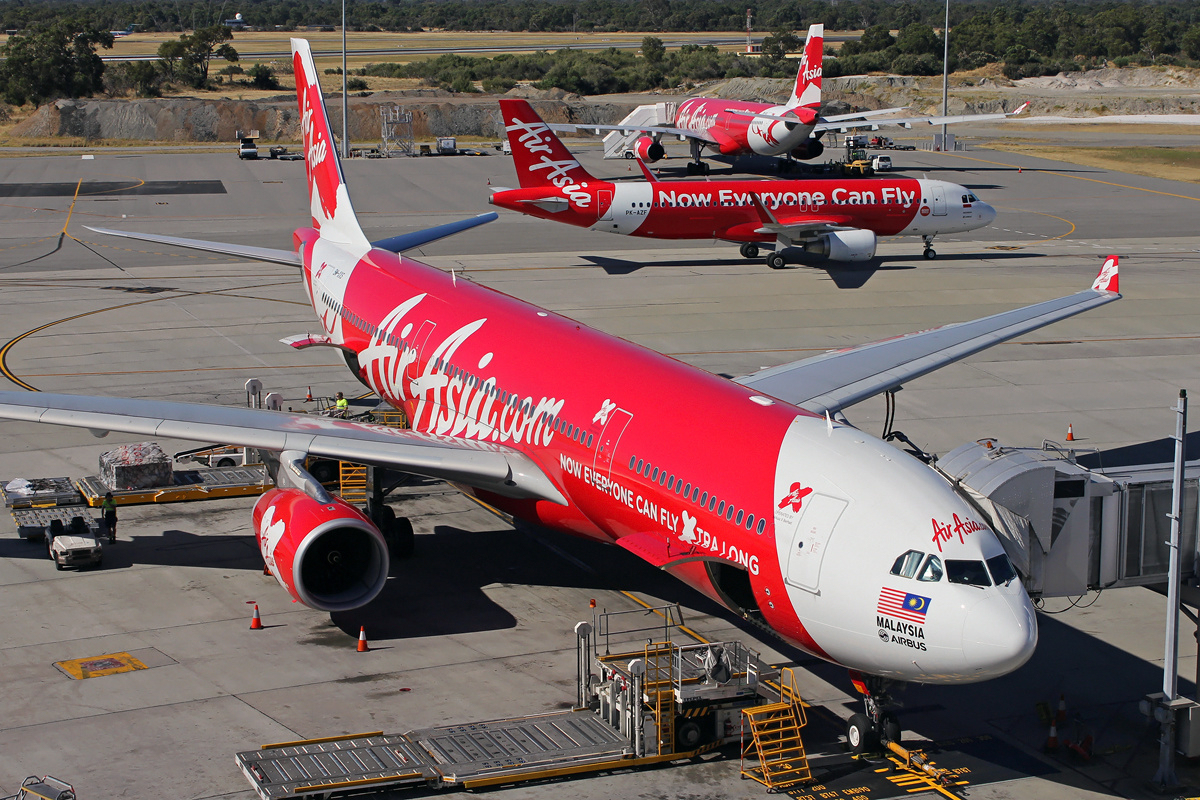
An AirAsia X aircraft at Perth Airport

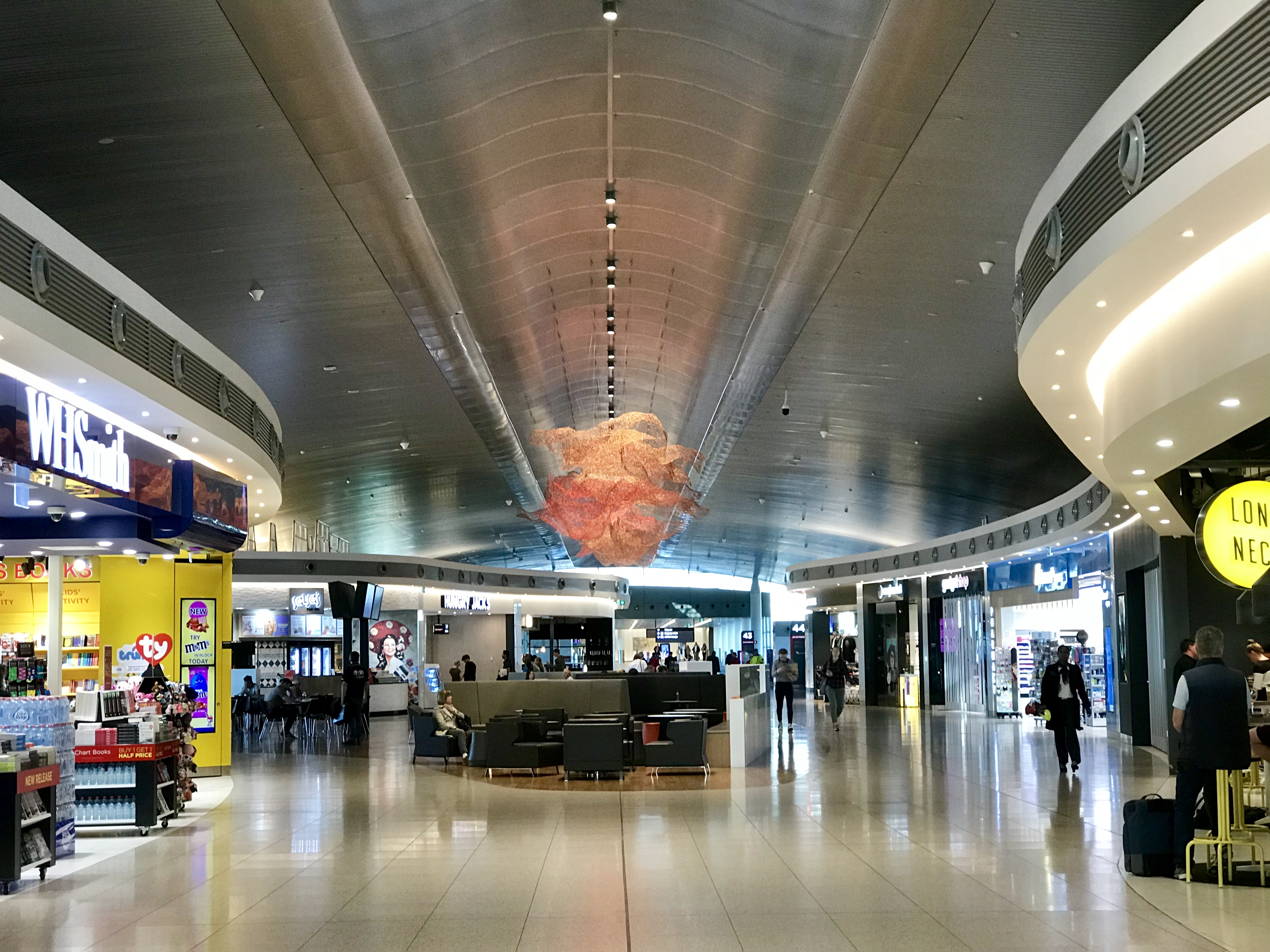
Terminal 1 (Domestic) in 2018

Annual passenger statistics for Perth Airport
| Year | Domestic | International | Total | Change |
|---|---|---|---|---|
| 1998 | 3,235,524 | 1,434,077 | 4,669,601 | ▲2.6% |
| 1999 | 3,257,087 | 1,474,898 | 4,731,985 | ▲1.3% |
| 2000 | 3,463,122 | 1,580,622 | 5,043,744 | ▲6.6% |
| 2001 | 3,341,803 | 1,587,379 | 4,929,182 | ▼ -2.3% |
| 2002 | 3,371,315 | 1,636,422 | 5,007,737 | ▲1.6% |
| 2003 | 3,892,623 | 1,586,622 | 5,479,245 | ▲9.4% |
| 2004 | 4,437,291 | 1,827,389 | 6,264,680 | ▲14.3% |
| 2005 | 4,754,672 | 2,007,025 | 6,761,697 | ▲7.9% |
| 2006 | 5,429,870 | 2,034,877 | 7,464,747 | ▲10.4% |
| 2007 | 6,105,246 | 2,373,568 | 8,478,814 | ▲13.6% |
| 2008 | 6,705,180 | 2,533,022 | 9,238,202 | ▲9.0% |
| 2009 | 6,841,037 | 2,774,737 | 9,615,774 | ▲4.1% |
| 2010 | 7,319,853 | 3,133,709 | 10,453,562 | ▲8.7% |
| 2011 | 8,016,032 | 3,349,468 | 11,365,500 | ▲8.7% |
| 2012 | 8,999,571 | 3,618,768 | 12,618,339 | ▲11.0% |
| 2013 | 8,981,872 | 3,919,840 | 12,901,712 | ▲2.2% |
| 2014 | 8,758,519 | 4,180,407 | 12,938,926 | ▲0.3% |
| 2015 | 8,401,532 | 4,192,833 | 12,594,365 | ▼ -2.7% |
| 2016 | 8,125,486 | 4,379,175 | 12,504,661 | ▼ -0.7% |
| 2017 | 7,985,065 | 4,385,467 | 12,370,532 | ▼ -1.1% |
| 2018 | 8,111,748 | 4,365,971 | 12,477,719 | ▲0.9% |
| 2019 | 8,150,336 | 4,363,180 | 12,513,516 | ▲0.3% |
| 2020 | 2,947,118 | 978,960 | 3,926,078 | ▼ -68.6% |
| 2021 | 3,854,138 | 90,651 | 3,944,789 | ▲0.5% |
| 2022 | 6,539,200 | 1,871,003 | 8,410,203 | ▲113.2% |
| 2023 | 8,278,831 | 3,885,836 | 12,164,667 | ▲44.6% |
| 2024 | 8,784,283 | 4,799,026 | 13,583,309 | ▲11.7% |
| 2025 | 9,356,046 | 5,395,068 | 14,751,114 | ▲7.8% |

=== Domestic ===
Busiest domestic routes - Perth Airport (year ending 31 December 2025)
| Rank | Airport | Passengers | % change |
|---|---|---|---|
| 1 | Melbourne | 2,109,230 | ▲3.9% |
| 2 | Sydney | 1,749,314 | ▲6.7% |
| 3 | Brisbane | 1,140,132 | ▲4.5% |
| 4 | Adelaide | 722,640 | ▲3.5% |
| 5 | Karratha | 687,533 | ▲13.0% |
| 6 | Port Hedland | 487,193 | ▲2.5% |
| 7 | Newman | 443,084 | ▲15.5% |
| 8 | Kalgoorlie | 397,651 | ▲8.1% |
| 9 | Broome | 374,285 | ▲5.4% |
| 10 | Darwin | 192,008 | ▲5.6% |
| 11 | Geraldton | 121,934 | ▲7.6% |

=== International ===
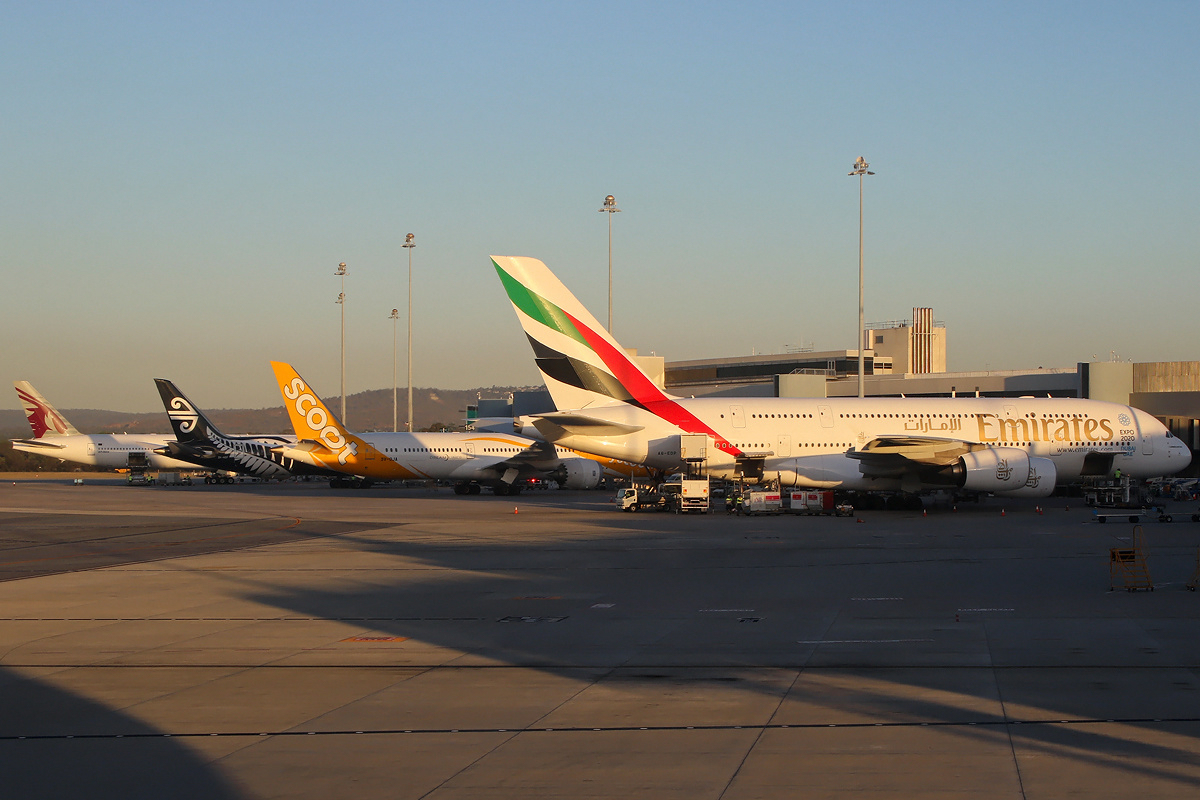
Afternoon lineup at Perth Airport (from front to back): Emirates Airbus A380, Scoot Boeing 787, Air New Zealand Boeing 787, Qatar Airways Boeing 777

Busiest international routes - Perth Airport (year ending 31 December 2025)
| Rank | Airport | Passengers | Airlines |
|---|---|---|---|
| 1 | Singapore | 1,466,188 | Jetstar, Qantas, Scoot, Singapore Airlines |
| 2 | Denpasar | 1,127,735 | Batik Air, Batik Air Malaysia, Indonesia AirAsia, Jetstar, TransNusa |
| 3 | Kuala Lumpur | 618,570 | AirAsia, Batik Air Malaysia, Malaysia Airlines |
| 4 | Doha | 355,817 | Qatar Airways |
| 5 | Dubai | 335,883 | Emirates |
| 6 | Hong Kong | 287,048 | Cathay Pacific |
| 7 | Auckland | 234,428 | Air New Zealand, Qantas |
| 8 | Bangkok | 229,720 | Jetstar, Thai Airways International |
| 9 | London-Heathrow | 151,199 | Qantas |
| 10 | Ho Chi Minh City | 112,086 | VietJet Air, Vietnam Airlines |

== Ground transport ==
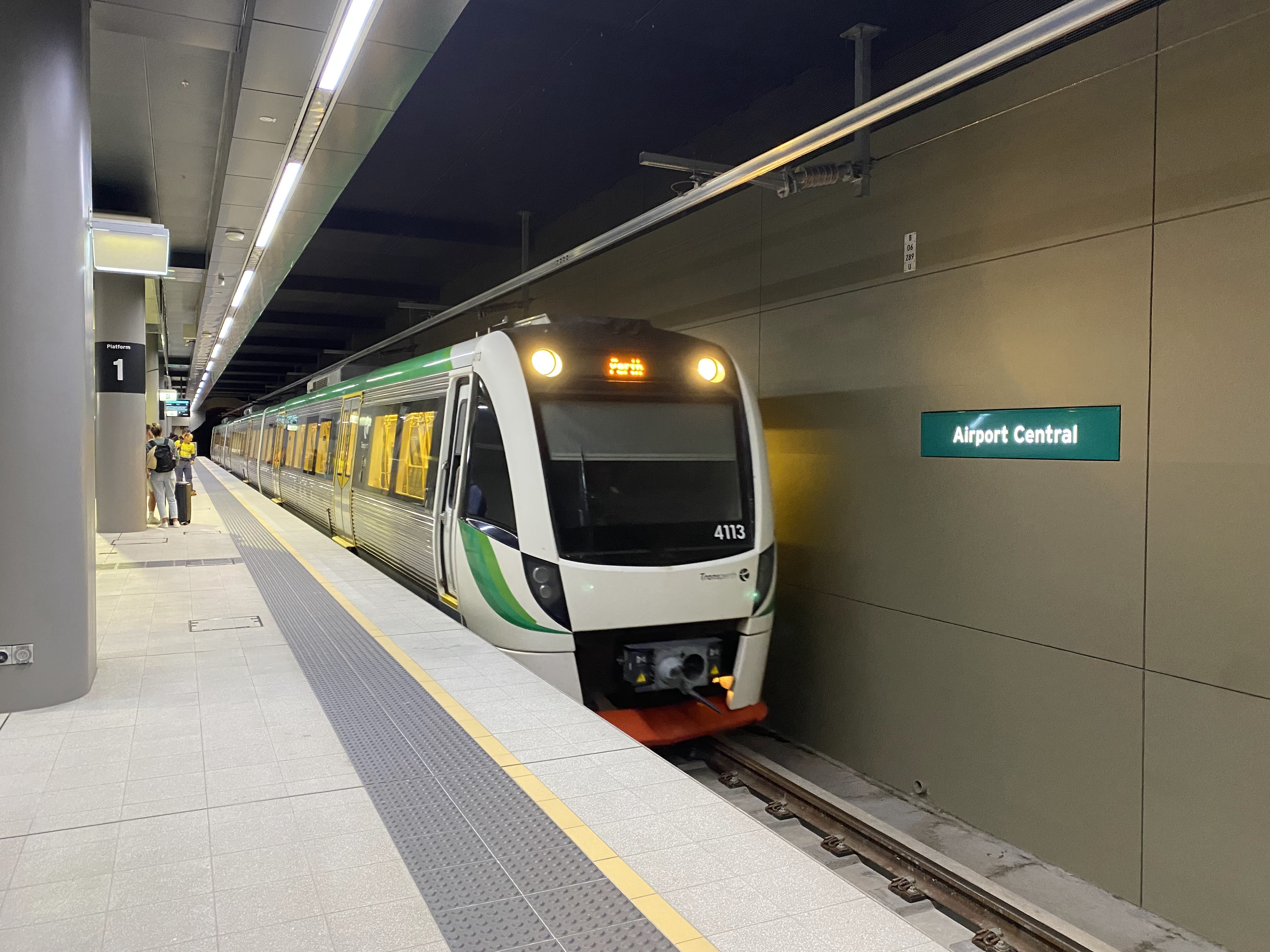
Airport Central railway station in 2023

=== Road ===
Road access from the city to terminals T1 and T2 is via Tonkin Highway and Airport Drive, and to terminals T3 and T4 via Tonkin Highway, Dunreath Drive and Brearley Avenue, or via Great Eastern Highway and Fauntleroy Avenue.

Transperth operates route 292, a circular route connecting terminals T3 and T4 to Redcliffe railway station. Transperth also operates route 37 from terminals T1 and T2 to Oats Street railway station. Transfer buses were operated by Carbridge between the T1/T2 and T3/T4 terminal precincts and Horizons West between the terminals and surrounding carparks. In November 2025 SkyBus took over both contracts.

A number of car rental companies have set up operations at the airport, and all terminals feature pick-up and drop-off areas dedicated to taxis and rideshare services.

=== Rail ===
Situated about 250 metres (820 ft) from terminals T1 and T2, Airport Central station is on the Airport line that runs through to the Perth central business district. The station and line opened on 9 October 2022. It is directly connected to terminal 1 via an enclosed pedestrian bridge dubbed the "skybridge".

The closest station to terminals T3 and T4 is Redcliffe, also on the Airport line, at a distance of about 980 metres (3,220 ft). Passengers for Terminals 3 and 4 can catch bus route 292, a circular service from Terminals 3 and 4 to Redcliffe station.

== Accidents and incidents ==
=== During construction ===
- On 13 April 1987, a Hiller 12E helicopter was being used for the installation of a rotating beacon atop the control tower, then under construction. The beacon was attached to the helicopter for lifting by a chain sling. After the beacon had been lifted into place, workers disconnected the chain sling from it. As the helicopter was departing,
  The hook on the sling became snagged on the tower guard rail ... causing it to pitch nose down and roll to the right. With the cable being tensioned by the pull of the helicopter the hook freed itself [and sprang] while crashing the strike side of the tower towards the helicopter. The cable flew up around the tail boom and became entangled in one of the main rotor blades. The other main rotor blade severed the tail boom which fell free of the helicopter striking the side of the tower on its way to the ground. The major section of the helicopter then fell to the ground at the base of the tower, caught fire and was burnt out.

=== Accidents en route ===
- On 2 July 1949 a Douglas DC-3, named Fitzroy, departed from Perth Airport for Carnarvon. Moments after takeoff it crashed about a mile north of the airport, killing all 18 people on board.
- On 26 June 1950 a Douglas DC-4 Skymaster, named Amana, departed from Perth Airport for Adelaide. It crashed 22 minutes later, near York, Western Australia, killing 28 of the 29 occupants. The sole survivor died in a Perth hospital six days later. This accident and the TAA Fokker Friendship disaster remain Australia's worst civil aviation accidents.

=== Emergency alternative airports ===
There are three emergency alternative airports for Perth, used usually in the case of fog or bad weather affecting Perth. In 2013, the state government flagged the need for a new emergency alternative airport, with Exmouth's Learmonth Airport and Adelaide Airport being inconvenient due to their significant distance from Perth. In 2017, plans for Cunderdin Airport to become a diversion airport for Perth were put in place. In 2018, it was proposed that Kalgoorlie-Boulder Airport would be a better alternative than Cunderdin. In 2019, Busselton Margaret River Airport had its bid to become a designated alternate international airport approved.

== Future development ==
=== Consolidation of terminals ===
The 2004 Perth Airport Master Plan aimed for the domestic and international terminals to be consolidated into a single terminal on the south-eastern side of the airfield by 2024. The updated 2020 Perth Airport Master Plan included a major expansion and upgrade of Terminal 1 and the construction of a new terminal adjacent to house Qantas' operations as part of the consolidation plans, with an intended completion date set for 2025.

However, the consolidation process faced protracted delays due to Qantas initially preferring to continue operating out of Terminals 3 and 4, a stance that drew criticism from both Perth Airport and the Western Australian state government. Qantas' transfer to Terminal 1 had been initially set to be completed by late 2025, but was pushed back due to the COVID-19 pandemic affecting air travel. Qantas had also cited a desire to upgrade and build out their current Perth hub in order to launch new international services before committing to a move to new facilities “over the long term”.

In May 2024, it was confirmed that Qantas and Perth Airport had come to an agreement for Qantas and Jetstar to move to a new terminal in the Airport Central precinct by 2031.

=== Future terminal ===
The draft 2026 Perth Airport Master Plan states that a site has been reserved for a terminal south of the future Qantas terminal that is anticipated to be required after 20 years. The proposed terminal will be similar in function to Terminal 2, catering for domestic and regional passengers.
