= Carbridge =

Australian bus company operating in airports

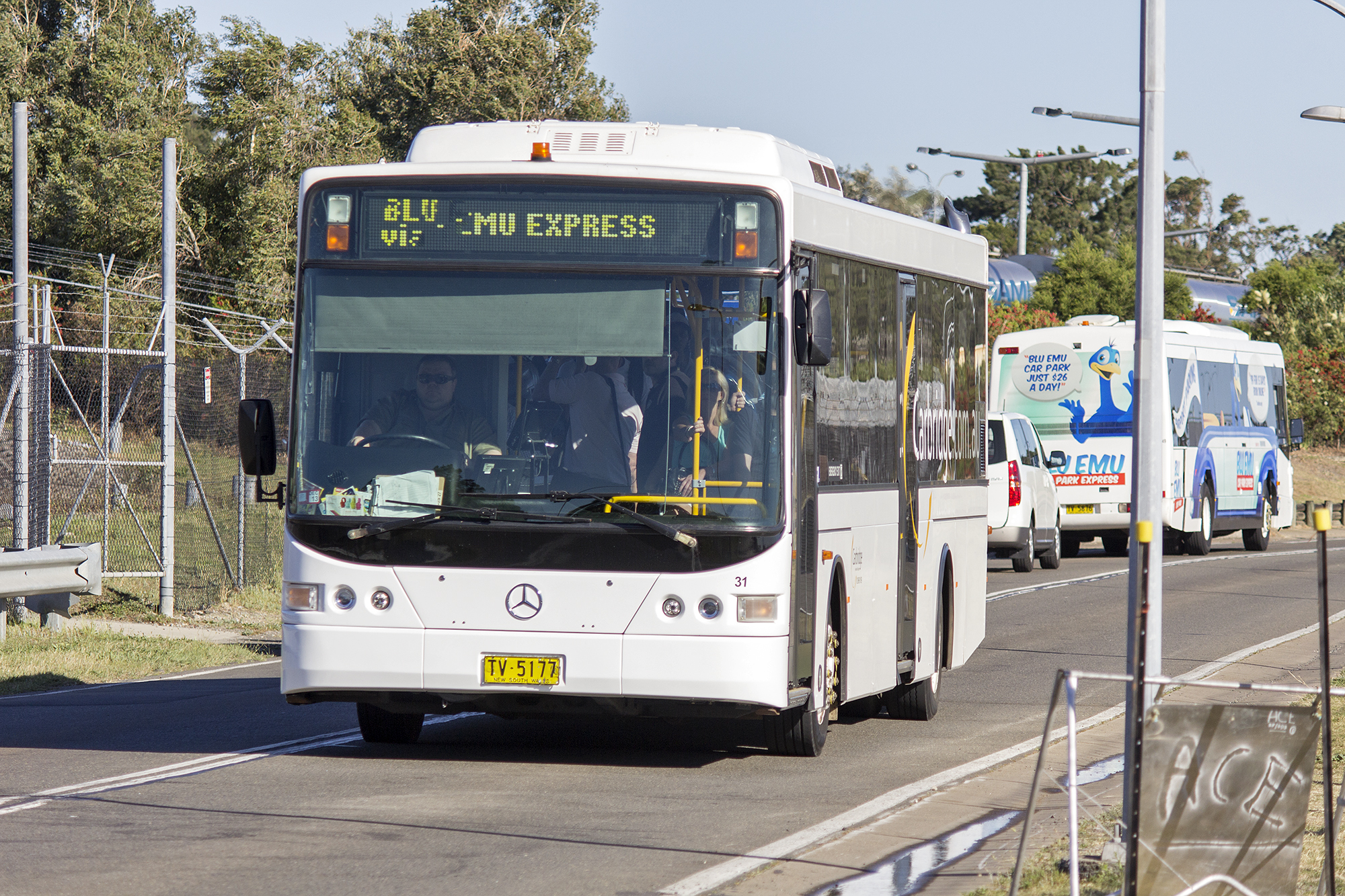
- Volgren bodied Mercedes-Benz O500LE at Sydney Airport in September 2013
- Parent: Swissport
- Commenced operation: 21 August 1995; 29 years ago
- Headquarters: Mascot
- Service area: Adelaide Airport; Brisbane Airport; Melbourne Airport; Perth Airport; Sydney Airport
- Service type: Airport bus operator
- Depots: 5
- Fleet: 74 (October 2014)
- Website: www.carbridge.com.au

Carbridge is an Australian airport bus company operating services at Adelaide, Brisbane, Melbourne, Perth and Sydney airports.

== History ==
Carbridge commenced operating on 21 August 1995. Formed by the Todd family, it initially operated staff services for Sydney Harbour Casino. When the casino opened on 13 September 1995, it began to operate courtesy buses from the casino to the Sydney central business district with a fleet of eight Ansair bodied Mercedes-Benz O400s painted in an all black livery.

By the time the permanent Star City Casino opened in November 1997, long-distance services were being operated to Newcastle, the Central Coast, the Blue Mountains and Wollongong with late model Mercedes-Benz and Scania coaches. By this stage a yellow and blue livery had been adopted. Most Star City services ceased in 1998, with the fleet sold off.

Carbridge then diversified into operating airport bus services, winning a contract at Sydney Airport with Neoplan apron buses purchased from Hong Kong's Kai Tak Airport. It has since expanded to operate services between airport terminals and car parks at Adelaide, Brisbane, Melbourne, Perth and Sydney airports.

== Fleet ==
As at October 2014, the fleet consisted of 74 buses and coaches.
