= Onslow Airport =

Airport in Western Australia

- IATA: ONS; ICAO: YOLW

Summary
- Airport type: Public
- Operator: Shire of Ashburton
- Location: Onslow, Western Australia, Australia
- Elevation AMSL: 23 ft / 7 m
- Coordinates: 21°40′06″S 115°06′47″E

Map
- Location in Western Australia

Runways
Direction	Length		Surface
Direction	m	ft	Surface
03/21	1,600	5,249	Asphalt
12/30	700	2,297	Gravel
- Sources: Australian AIP and aerodrome chart

Onslow Airport (IATA: ONS, ICAO: YOLW) is located 2 nautical miles (3.7 km; 2.3 mi) south of the coastal town of Onslow in Western Australia's Pilbara region.

The airport is used for FIFO, private charter, general aviation, Royal Flying Doctor Services and RPT services (Regular Public Transport) operated by QantasLink and Virgin Australia Regional Airlines who operate several services per week. The airport is owned and operated by the Shire of Ashburton.

== Airlines and destinations ==
Airlines	Destinations
QantasLink	Perth
Virgin Australia Regional Airlines	Perth

== See also ==
- List of airports in Western Australia
- Aviation transport in Australia
- Operation Potshot
