= Port Hedland International Airport =

Airport in Port Hedland, Western Australia

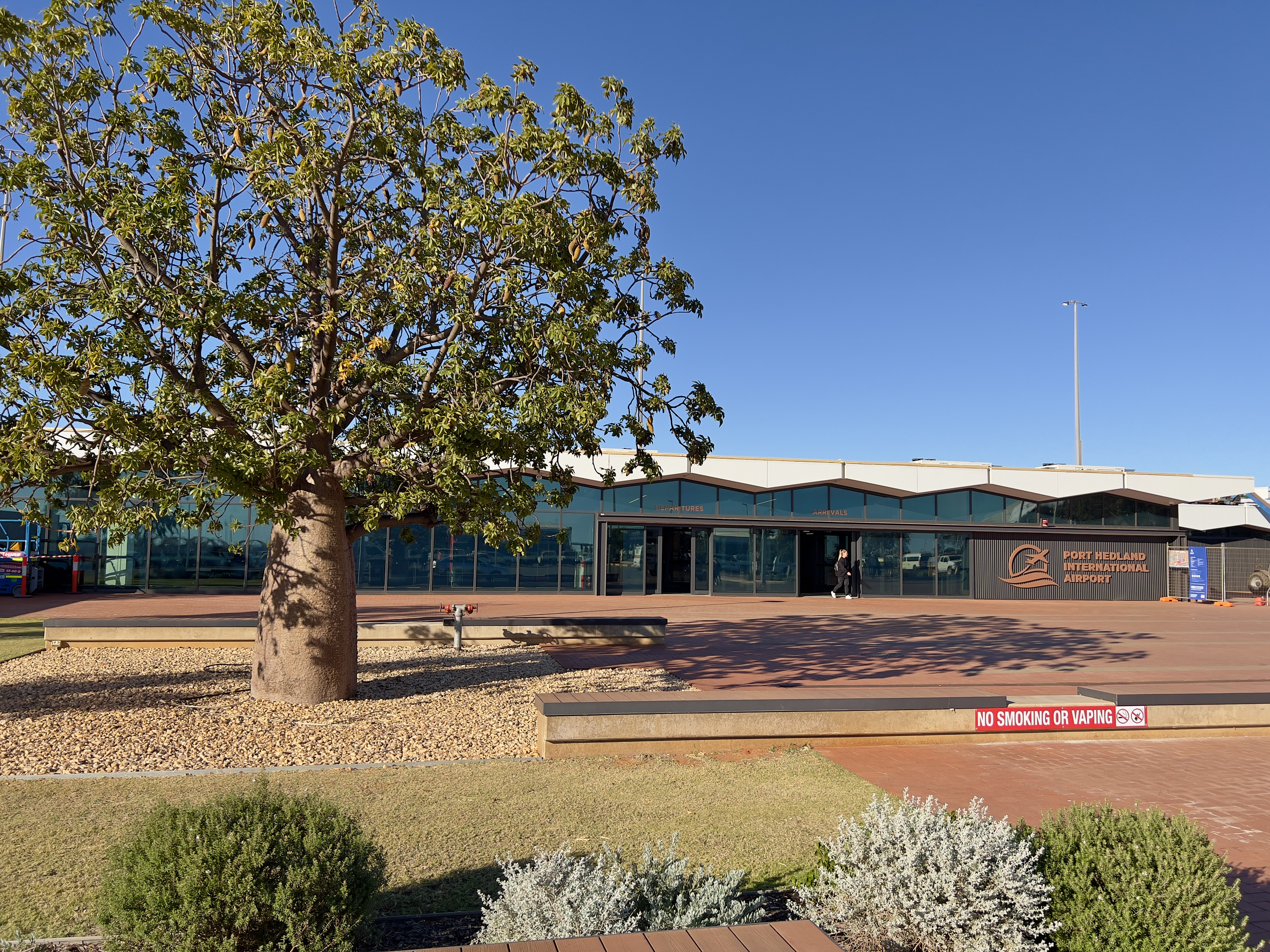
- IATA: PHE; ICAO: YPPD

Summary
- Airport type: Public
- Owner: Town of Port Hedland
- Operator: Dexus (50%); Infrastructure Capital Group (50%)
- Serves: Port Hedland and South Hedland
- Location: Port Hedland, Western Australia
- Elevation AMSL: 33 ft / 10 m
- Coordinates: 20°22′40″S 118°37′35″E
- Website: porthedlandairport.com.au

Maps
- Location in Western Australia YPPD (Australia)
- Interactive map of Port Hedland International Airport

Runways
Direction	Length		Surface
Direction	m	ft	Surface
14/32	2,500	8,202	Chipseal
18/36	1,000	3,281	Chipseal

Statistics (2014/15)
- Passengers: 470,741
- Aircraft movements: 5,518
- Sources: Australian AIP and aerodrome chart

Port Hedland International Airport (IATA: PHE, ICAO: YPPD) is an international airport serving Port Hedland, Western Australia. The airport is 5 nautical miles (9.3 km; 5.8 mi) south-east of Port Hedland and 11 km (6.8 mi) from South Hedland. It is an important airport for passengers who work in the mining industry.

== History ==
In December 1999, construction of a new terminal began.

The airport has undergone a number of upgrades. Stage one of works include the extension of an existing taxiway and installation of new lighting, the construction of a new taxiway, widening of taxiway intersections and the extension of the domestic and international arrivals and departures area. This was to be completed by the end of July 2011. A further upgrade occurred in 2013.

Between 2008 and 2014, passenger movements more than doubled as a result of increased fly-in fly-out activity to the Pilbara during the mining boom. In August 2010, Qantas began operating weekly services from Brisbane and Melbourne with Airbus A320s.

Virgin Australia Regional Airlines previously operated flights to Denpasar which were suspended in 2014, the Denpasar flight resumed on 4 April 2015 and was operated by Virgin Australia. This flight was cancelled during the COVID-19 pandemic however as of 2023 the town council was advocating for this route to be reinstated.

In July 2015, the Town of Port Hedland agreed to lease the airport to AMP Capital (since acquired by Dexus) and Infrastructure Capital Group for 50 years.

In 2023, a redevelopment of the terminal was completed.

== Airlines and destinations ==
Airlines	Destinations
Alliance Airlines	Perth
Aviair	Newman
Nexus Airlines	Broome, Geraldton, Karratha
Qantas	Perth
QantasLink	Perth
Virgin Australia	Perth
Virgin Australia Regional Airlines	Perth

== Statistics ==
Port Hedland International Airport was ranked 21st in Australia for the number of revenue passengers served in financial year 2022/23 and is third busiest airport in Western Australia.

Annual passenger and aircraft statistics for Port Hedland
Year	Revenue passengers	Aircraft movements
2001–02	69,681	2,388
2002–03	76,789	2,393
2003–04	91,371	2,502
2004–05	100,430	2,791
2005–06	120,931	2,103
2006–07	158,755	2,159
2007–08	196,252	2,588
2008–09	208,819	2,757
2009–10	296,810	3,477
2010–11	367,690	4,721
2011–12	473,979	5,450
2012–13	512,630	6,020
2013–14	504,659	5,754
2014–15	470,727	5,518
2015–16	387,048	5,098
2016–17	360,984	4,840
2017–18	363,508	4,622
2018–19	382,590	4,692
2019–20	317,151	3,908
2020–21	267,330	3,479
2021–22	409,666	4,338
2022–23	477,036	4,173
2023–24	479,295	5,260

== Operations ==
Busiest domestic routes into and out of Port Hedland Airport (FY 2023)
Rank	Airport	Passengers movements	change
1	Perth Airport	475,876	▲16.6%*

The Perth-Port Hedland city-pair was the 30th busiest air route in Australia in Financial Year 2022-23.

== See also ==
- List of airports in Western Australia
- Aviation transport in Australia
