= Laverton Airport =

- IATA: LVO; ICAO: YLTN

Summary
- Airport type: Public
- Operator: Shire of Laverton
- Location: Laverton, Western Australia
- Elevation AMSL: 1,530 ft (470 m)
- Coordinates: 28°36′50″S 122°25′47″E

Map
- Location in Western Australia

Runways
Direction	Length		Surface
Direction	m	ft	Surface
07/25	1,800	5,906	Asphalt
16/34	919	3,015	Earth
- Sources: Australian AIP and aerodrome chart

Laverton Airport (IATA: LVO, ICAO: YLTN) is an airport in Laverton, Western Australia. It is a low-use airport found 1 nautical mile (1.9 km; 1.2 mi) northeast from the main area of Laverton. It has an operational and storage capacity of 19 medium-sized planes; however, it has an average of only 417 flights a year.

The runway was sealed in the early 1990s. The airport received $171,314 for security upgrades in 2006. The security status was changed in 2011.

A terminal building is scheduled to open in late 2024.

== Airlines and destinations ==
Airlines	Destinations
Alliance Airlines	Charter: Perth
