= Gruyere Airport =

Airport in Western Australia

- IATA: GYZ; ICAO: YGRM

Summary
- Airport type: Private
- Coordinates: 28°02′03″S 123°48′52″E

Map
- Location of the airport in Western Australia

Runways
Direction	Length		Surface
Direction	m	ft	Surface
06/24	2,100	6,890	Asphalt

Gruyere Airport (IATA: GYZ, ICAO: YGRM) is an airport serving the Pilbara region of Western Australia.

== Airlines and destinations ==
Airlines	Destinations
Virgin Australia	Charter: Perth

== See also ==
- List of airports in Western Australia
- Aviation transport in Australia
