= Newman Airport =

Airport in Western Australia

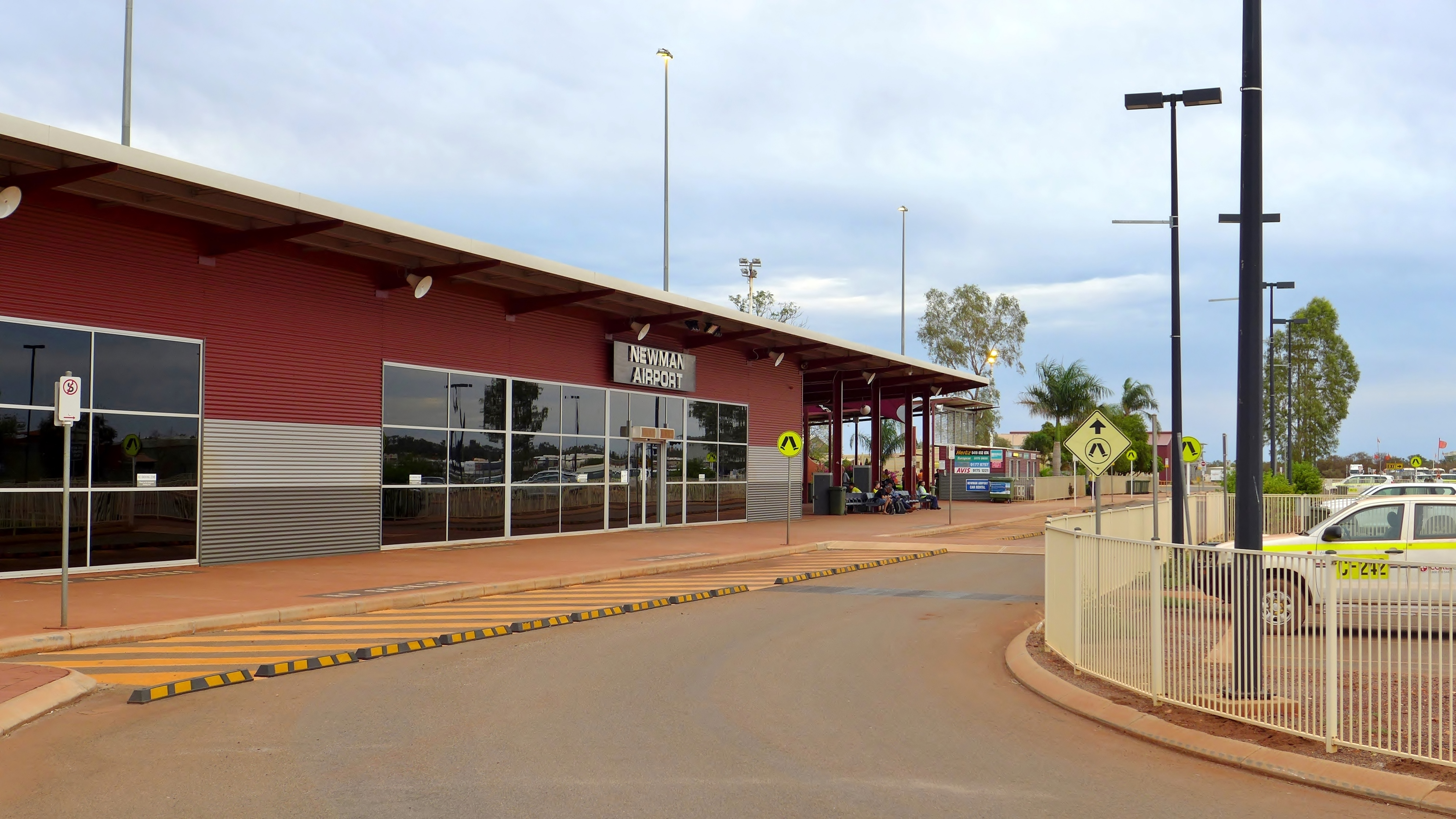
- The terminal at Newman Airport, Western Australia
- IATA: ZNE; ICAO: YNWN

Summary
- Airport type: Public
- Owner/Operator: Shire of East Pilbara
- Location: Newman, Western Australia
- Elevation AMSL: 1,724 ft (525 m)
- Coordinates: 23°25′04″S 119°48′10″E

Map
- Location in Western Australia

Runways
Direction	Length		Surface
Direction	m	ft	Surface
05/23	2,072	6,798	Asphalt

Statistics (2024/25)
- Passengers: 430,415
- Aircraft movements: 4,172
- Sources: Australian AIP and aerodrome chart Passenger and aircraft movements from the BITRE

Newman Airport (IATA: ZNE, ICAO: YNWN) is an airport near Newman, in the Pilbara region of Western Australia, situated 5.5 nautical miles (10.2 km; 6.3 mi) southeast of the town.

The airport is owned and maintained by the Shire of East Pilbara. Newman's primary air traffic is made up by a mixture of light aircraft, QantasLink and Virgin Australia flights. QantasLink and Virgin Australia fly RPT flights to Perth only (with the exception of their regular charter flights) whereas the lighter aircraft fly to outer communities as well as to Port Hedland and other Pilbara towns.

== Airlines and destinations ==
Airlines	Destinations
Alliance Airlines	Perth
Aviair	Port Hedland
National Jet Express	Perth
Qantas	Perth
QantasLink	Perth
Virgin Australia	Perth

== Statistics ==
Newman Airport was ranked 23rd in Australia for the number of revenue passengers served in financial year 2024–2025.

Annual passenger and aircraft statistics for Newman
Year	Revenue passengers	Aircraft movements
2001-02	50,246	1,394
2002-03	60,393	1,307
2003-04	62,670	1,591
2004-05	75,384	1,632
2005-06	100,516	1,518
2006-07	114,889	1,563
2007-08	135,987	1,850
2008-09	176,559	2,616
2009-10	184,667	2,964
2010-11	221,104	3,008
2011-12	301,343	3,478
2012-13	439,813	4,660
2013-14	408,332	4,887
2014-15	349,472	4,380
2015-16	320,561	4,453
2016-17	293,983	4,174
2017-18	294,237	3,994
2018-19	323,468	4,109
2019-20	268,768	3,298
2020-21	234,839	3,117
2021-22	327,004	4,065
2022-23	365,796	3,891
2023-24	372,181	4,039
2024-25	430,415	4,172

== Operations ==
Busiest domestic routes into and out of Newman Airport (FY 2013)
Rank	Airport	Passengers carried	% change
1	Western Australia, Perth Airport	438,884	▲46.4

== See also ==
- List of airports in Western Australia
- Aviation transport in Australia
