= Kalgoorlie–Boulder Airport =

Airport in goldfields region of Western Australia

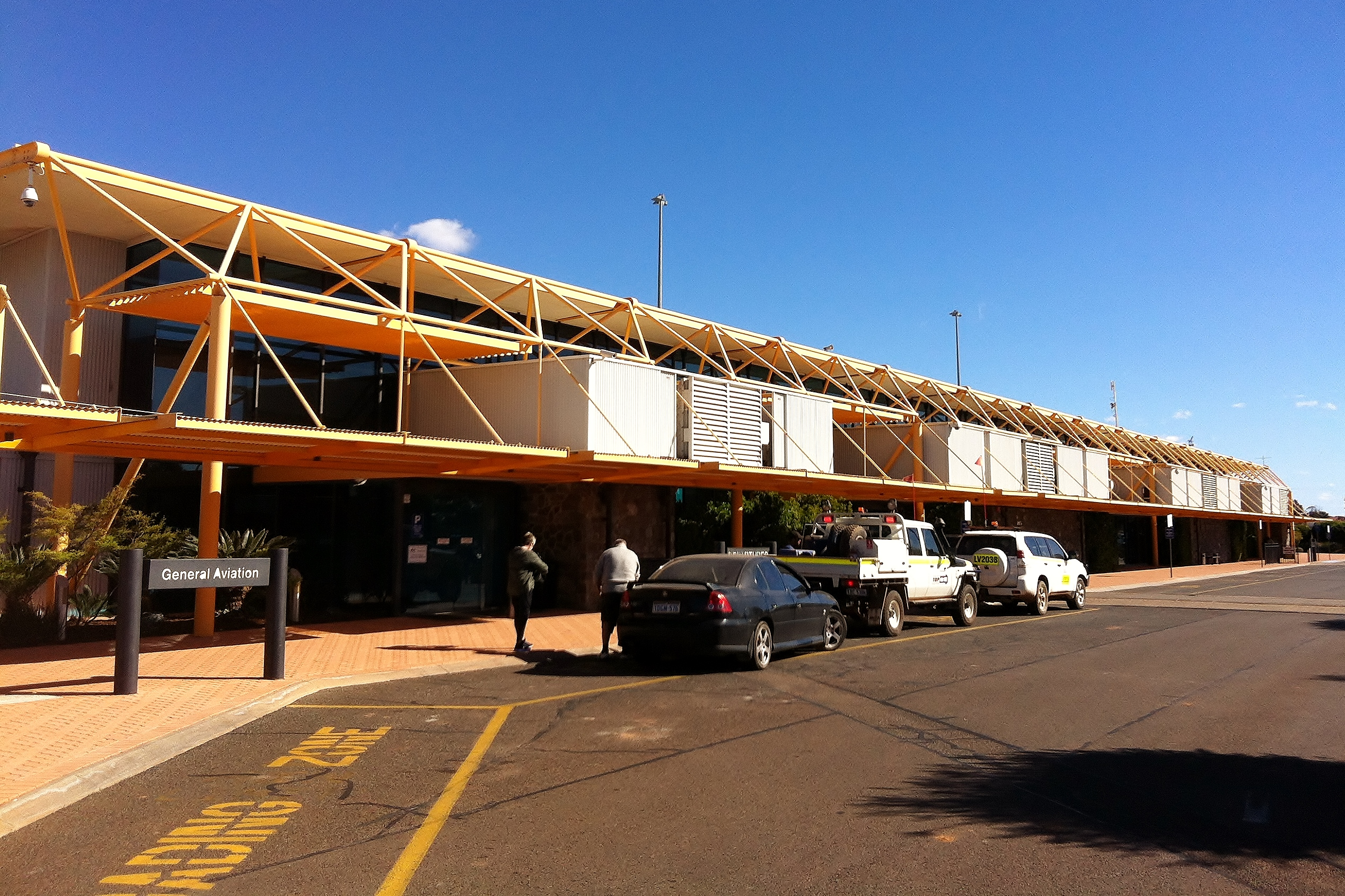
- The airport terminal in 2018
- IATA: KGI; ICAO: YPKG

Summary
- Airport type: Public
- Operator: City of Kalgoorlie–Boulder
- Location: Kalgoorlie, Western Australia
- Elevation AMSL: 1,203 ft (367 m)
- Coordinates: 30°47′22″S 121°27′42″E
- Website: airport.ckb.wa.gov.au

Map
- Location in Western Australia

Runways
Direction	Length		Surface
Direction	m	ft	Surface
11/29	2,000	6,562	Asphalt
18/36	1,200	3,937	Asphalt

Statistics (2021–22)
- Passengers: 299,055
- Sources: Australian AIP and aerodrome chart Passenger and aircraft movements from the BITRE

Kalgoorlie–Boulder Airport (IATA: KGI, ICAO: YPKG) is an airport in Kalgoorlie, Western Australia. The airport is 3 nautical miles (5.6 km; 3.5 mi) south of the city. It handled 299,055 passengers in the 2021–22 financial year.

The airport is a major hub for fly-in fly-out service due to the mining boom in the region. It is also a hub for the Goldfields Air Services, which offers chartering and flight lessons, along with the Royal Flying Doctor Service, which uses Kalgoorlie as a hub due to the lack of medical assistance for people in the region, transporting major injuries from Kalgoorlie to Perth.

== History ==
Construction and fencing of the Kalgoorlie Aerodrome commenced in 1928, and completed the following year with Royal Australian Air Force landing five Wapiti Jupiter Series aeroplanes in front of large crowds. The aeroplanes were making their way to Perth in preparation for the East-West Air Race.

In 1949 a mass scrapping of Vultee Vengeance dive-bombers took place at the airport, with the engines, undercarriage legs and some cockpit fittings of 20 aircraft being removed and sent to Perth by a salvage company, while local citizens also purchased aircraft for parts. Some years later the abandoned airframes were cut up and loaded on trucks to move to scrap yards.

Ownership of the airport was transferred from the Government of Australia to the Shire of Boulder in 1989 with a A$4.2 million grant to construct a new terminal and additional runway space. The new airport opened in November 1992.

The airport hosts a number of daily Perth to Kalgoorlie return flight services. In November 2007 Skywest Airlines commenced a three-times-weekly direct service from Kalgoorlie to Melbourne; this service ceased in November 2008 due to soaring fuel prices and increasing economic uncertainty. Skywest resumed its Kalgoorlie to Melbourne operation in February 2010, with a once-a-week service.

Prior to May 2014, Qantas operated two flights between Kalgoorlie and Adelaide. Qantas has also operated direct flights between Kalgoorlie and Sydney during peak periods, such as the annual Diggers & Dealers conference. In 2020, Virgin Australia suspended their direct flights between Kalgoorlie and Melbourne due to the COVID-19 pandemic.

== Airlines and destinations ==
Airlines	Destinations
Alliance Airlines	Perth
Nexus Airlines	Perth
Qantas	Perth
QantasLink	Perth
Virgin Australia	Perth
Virgin Australia Regional Airlines	Perth

== Operations ==
Busiest domestic routes into and out of Kalgoorlie–Boulder Airport (year ending December 2024)
Rank	Airport	Passengers carried	% change
1	Perth	366,900	▲2.1
