= Desert pride =

Desert pride is a common name for several shrubs native to Australia and may refer to:

- Eremophila eriocalyx
- Eremophila mackinlayi
