= Wiluna =

Wiluna may refer to:

- Wiluna, Western Australia
- Wiluna Airport, the airport at Wiluna, Western Australia
- Wiluna Branch Railway, a former branch line of the Western Australian Government Railways
- Shire of Wiluna, a local government area in the Mid West region of Western Australia
- Wiluna Gold Mine, a gold mine in Western Australia
