= Lake Way =

Lake in Western Australia

- Location in Western Australia
- Interactive map of Lake Way
- Location: Mid West, Western Australia
- Coordinates: 26°47′03″S 120°20′09″E
- Type: Dry saline
- Primary inflows: Surface runoff
- Basin countries: Australia
- Surface area: 460 km^{2} (180 sq mi)

Lake Way is a dry saline lake in the Mid West region of Western Australia, approximately 15 kilometres (9.3 mi) south of Wiluna. It also gives its name to a nearby cattle station, the Lake Way Station.

== Description ==
The lake, dry except during exceptional floods such as occurred in 1900, 1942, 1963, repeatedly from 1992 to 2001 and in 2006, runs roughly parallel to the Leinster-Wiluna road, which is part of the Goldfields Highway.

The lake is the site of one of the most advanced uranium mining projects in Western Australia, the Centipede–Lake Way project, which is pursued by Toro Energy. Toro Energy has acquired the Lake Maitland uranium project and in 2010 proposed to operate both projects.

== Mining ==
=== Gold ===
The lake has been the site of an open-pit gold mining operation, which was part of the Wiluna Gold Mine. The Williamson pit, located within the lake and accessed through a causeway, was mined from 2005 to 2007, but the pit only contained low grade ore of approximately 1.75 g/t. After initial high expectations and reported grades of up to 25 g/t, the operation was a disappointment, with less-than-expected production. The open pit was also the site of a fatal mining accident in July 2005.

Agincourt Resources, the owner of the mine at the time, spun off its uranium exploration by forming Nova Energy in April 2005. After the takeover of Agincourt through Oxiana Limited, Nova Energy became part of Toro Energy in August 2007.

=== Uranium mining project ===
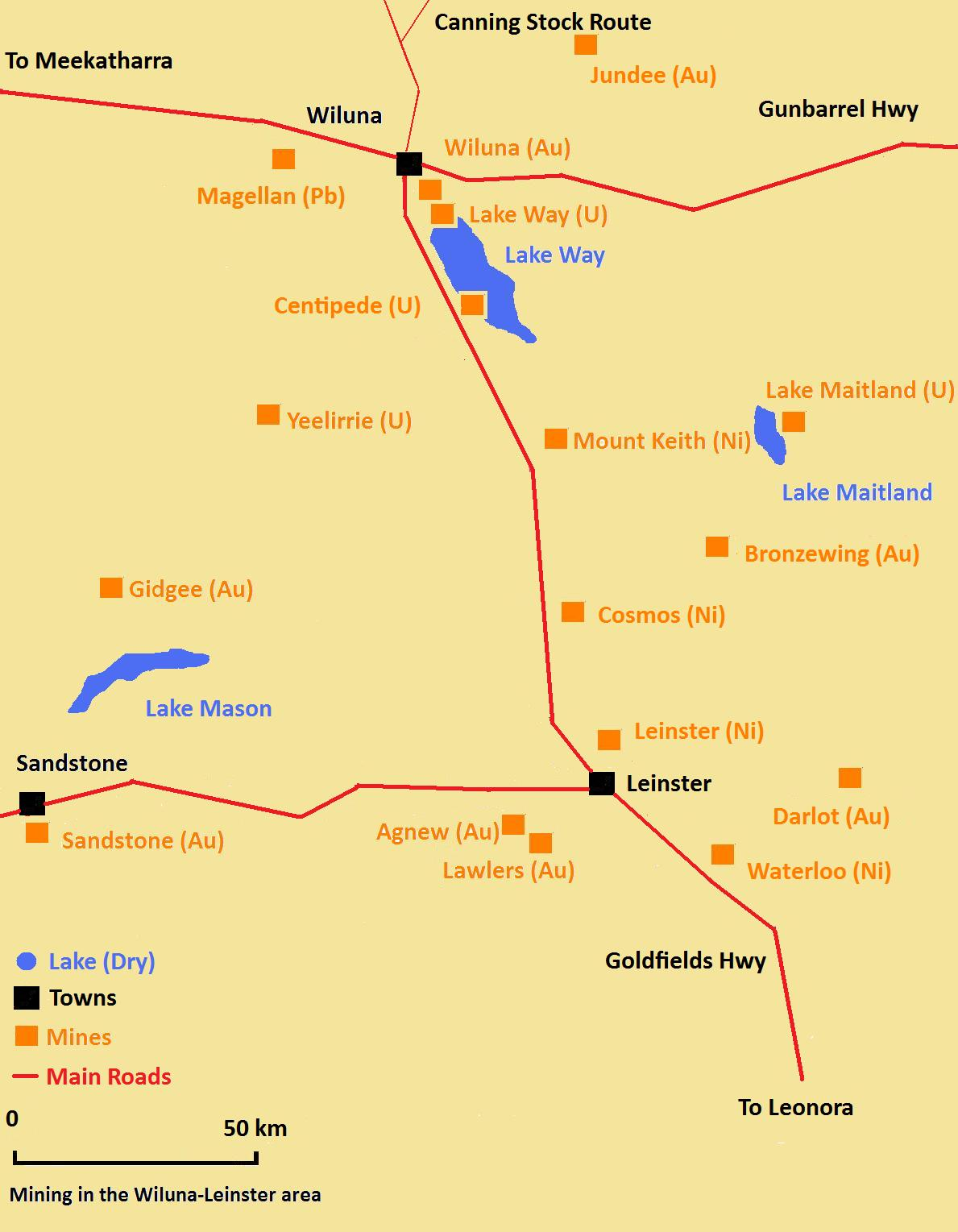
Mining in the Wiluna-Leinster area.

The six-year Western Australian ban on uranium mining was lifted in 2008, after the 2008 state elections, which saw the Australian Labor Party replaced in government by the Liberal Party of Australia. Two uranium mining projects in the state were expected to begin production by 2012-13, the 750-tonne (740-long-ton; 830-short-ton) U_{3}O_{8} Lake Maitland project, located at Lake Maitland, pursued by Mega Uranium, and the 680-tonne (670-long-ton; 750-short-ton) U_{3}O_{8} Centipede–Lake Way project undertaken by Toro Energy.

The uranium mining projects in Western Australia have attracted opposition from organisations like the Anti-Nuclear Alliance of Western Australia, which have attempted to put a hold on them before they reach active mining stage.

Uranium mining at Lake Way is not a new project but dates back to 1978, when it was first proposed by the Wyoming Mineral Corporation and Delhi International Oil. In 1982, the Australian Government granted Delhi International permission to develop the mine, but the project was suspended in the following year. Mining would have been carried out in the form of small open pits, spread over nine square kilometres.

Current mining activities at Lake Way are scheduled to be carried out at two locations, at the Lake Way deposit at the northern end of the lake and the Centipede deposit on the southwestern side of the lake. Toro plans to extract the uranium oxide through a heap leach process, with an annual production of 700 tonnes (690 long tons; 770 short tons) and a mine life of 10 years.

In February 2010, Toro received advice from the Western Australian Minister for Environment, Donna Faragher, that the government had dismissed an appeal against the level of environmental assessment protocols for the Wiluna project. Previous to that, the government granted approval for a resource evaluation test pit at Lake Way, with the trial also receiving approval from the native title holders. Following this, in May 2010, Toro carried out an eight-week operation of a test pit.

Western Australian MP Robin Chapple queried why radioactive uranium oxide and ore was still lying around unburied and unfenced at Lake Way in 2010, after an earlier question on the same subject had been raised in 2000. The Department of Mines and Petroleum confirmed the material as naturally occurring uranium-bearing rock through laboratory testing.

== See also ==
- List of lakes of Australia § Western Australia
- Mining in Western Australia
