= Lake Way Station =

Pastoral lease in Western Australia

Coordinates: 26.948°S 120.475°E

Location in Western Australia

Lake Way Station is a pastoral lease that once operated as a sheep station and now operates as a cattle station in Western Australia.

Situated approximately 46 kilometres (29 mi) south east of Wiluna and 110 kilometres (68 mi) north of Leinster in the Mid West region. The ephemeral lake, Lake Way is partly situated within the station boundaries on the northern side, where it adjoins Lake Violet Station.

Gold was found in the area in 1896 by a party of four prospectors that travelled from Cue. The men started the Black Swan Mine. Pastoralists followed soon after and properties were established running sheep and cattle.

The station, along with many others, was flooded that year after heavy rainfall in 1900 from a tropical depression that had crossed the coast in the North West.

Acquired by the Lake Way Pastoral company in 1924, 3,300 Bungaree ewes were introduced to the property shortly afterwards. The property had an area of about 600,000 acres (242,811 ha) in 1925. The property had recently been acquired by the Lake Way Pastoral Company. The main shareholders directors of the Company were the Williams brothers, Herbert Lukin and the Sermon brothers. Messrs Lukin and Williams owned Lake Way in 1926 when 4,000 sheep were delivered. Approximately 10,000 sheep were railed into the Wiluna area in the early part of the same year.

In 2004 the property was owned by the Lupton family who had been experiencing feral dog attacks on their sheep.

== See also ==
- List of ranches and stations
- List of pastoral leases in Western Australia
