= Lake Maitland =

Lake in Western Australia

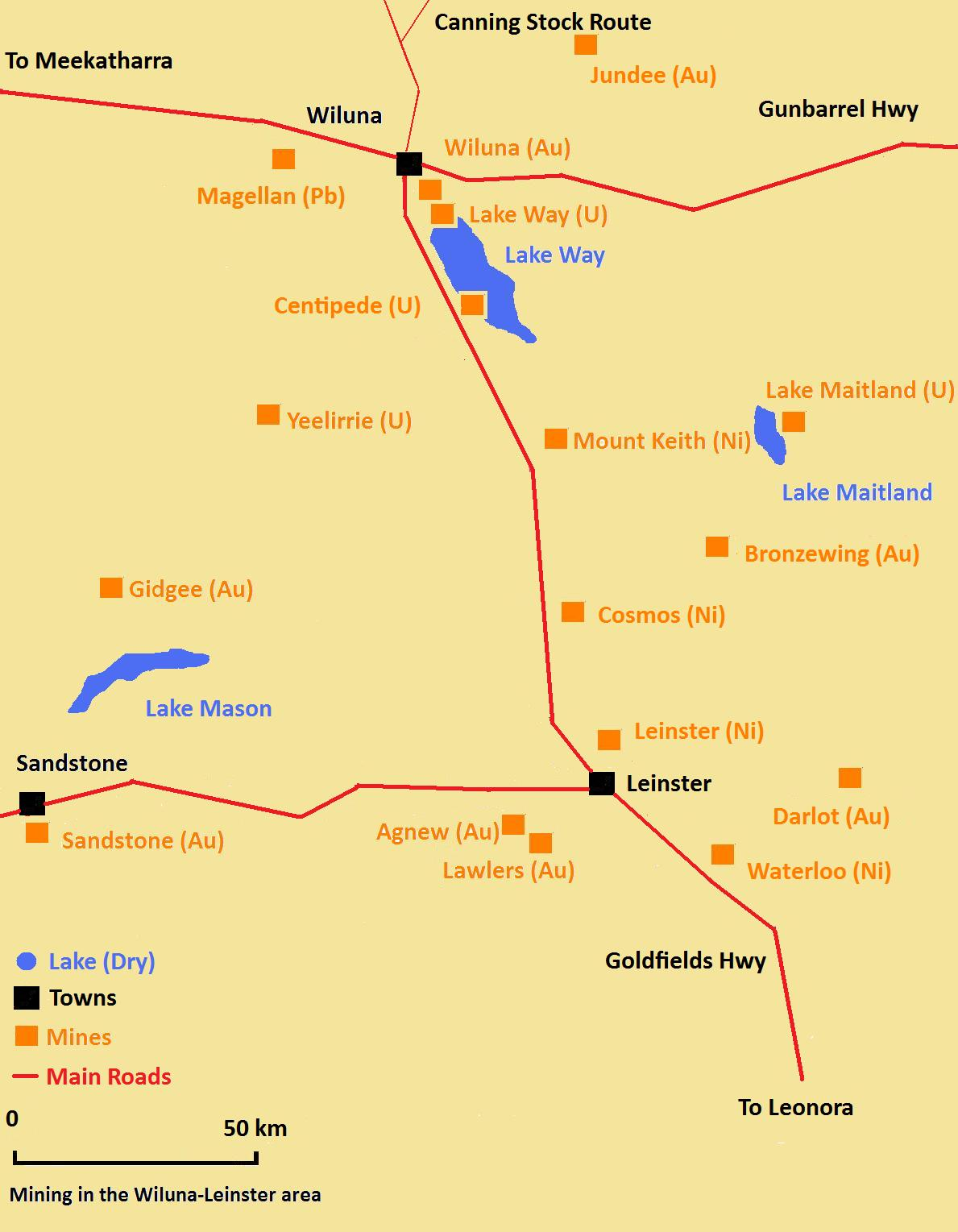
- Mining in the Wiluna-Leinster area. Lake Maitland is in the upper right.

- Location in Western Australia
- Interactive map of Lake Maitland
- Location: Mid West, Western Australia
- Coordinates: 27°10′48″S 121°05′00″E
- Type: Dry; saline
- Basin countries: Australia

Lake Maitland is a dry salt lake approximately 100 kilometres (62 mi) south east of Wiluna, in the Mid West region of Western Australia.

== Mining project ==
The Lake Maitland project was being pursued by Canadian company Mega Uranium. Mega teamed up with Australian company Toro Energy Pty Ltd in 2013, Toro Energy have an active proposal to mine uranium at Lake Way - incorporate two uranium deposits - Lake Way and Centipede.

Toro Energy submitted a referral to the WA and Federal Government in 2014 to include the Lake Maitland and Millipede deposits to the existing proposal to mine Lake Way and Centipede. The proposal is to now to mine 4 deposits across 2 lake systems.

It is one of four advanced uranium mining projects, the others being the Lake Way uranium project, Yeelirrie uranium project, and Kintyre uranium deposit.

== Uranium mining project ==
The 750-tonne (740-long-ton; 830-short-ton) U_{3}O_{8} Lake Maitland project, pursued by Mega Uranium, and the 680 tonnes U_{3}O_{8} Centipede–Lake Way project undertaken by Toro Energy, located at Lake Way.

The uranium mining projects in Western Australia have attracted opposition from organisations like the Anti-Nuclear Alliance of Western Australia, which have attempted to put a hold on them before they reach active mining stage.

The Lake Maitland uranium deposit was first discovered in 1972 by Asarco Australia. The deposit saw limited exploration efforts in the 1980s, but progress was halted because of a dispute between the joint owners at the time, but also saw frequent changes in ownership.

After some more drilling in 2005 by Redport Ltd, the company was taken over by Mega Uranium in December 2006, who continued drilling and exploration efforts in 2007-08. The future mine, while remote, benefits from existing infrastructure in the region from other mines. It is approximately 30 km north of the Bronzewing Gold Mine. A 35 percent stake in the mine is held by Japanese consortium Japan Australia Uranium Resources Development Co (JAURD). JAURD is jointly owned by Kansai Electric Power, Kyushu Electric Power and Shikoku Electric Power, who, between them, operate nuclear power plants.

The mine, expected to have a mine live of ten years, is scheduled to produce 1.65 million pounds of uranium oxide a year.

== See also ==
- List of lakes of Australia § Western Australia
