= Leioproctus chrysopyga =

Scientific classification
- Kingdom: Animalia
- Phylum: Arthropoda
- Clade: Pancrustacea
- Class: Insecta
- Order: Hymenoptera
- Family: Colletidae
- Genus: Leioproctus
- Species: L. chrysopyga

Binomial name
- Leioproctus chrysopyga Batley, 2025

Species of bee

Leioproctus chrysopyga, or Leioproctus (Euryglossidia) chrysopyga, is a species of bee in the family Colletidae and subfamily Colletinae. It is endemic to Australia. It was described by entomologist Michael Batley in 2025.

== Etymology ==
The specific epithet chrysopyga (Latin: "golden tail") is an anatomical reference.

== Description ==
The male body length is 4.9 mm, female body length 5.2 mm. Integumental colouration is mainly black and dark brown, with a yellow-brown end to the female metasoma. The hair is mostly white to yellow and brown.

== Distribution and habitat ==
The species occurs in inland Western Australia. The type locality is Wongawol, near Wiluna, in the Mid West region.

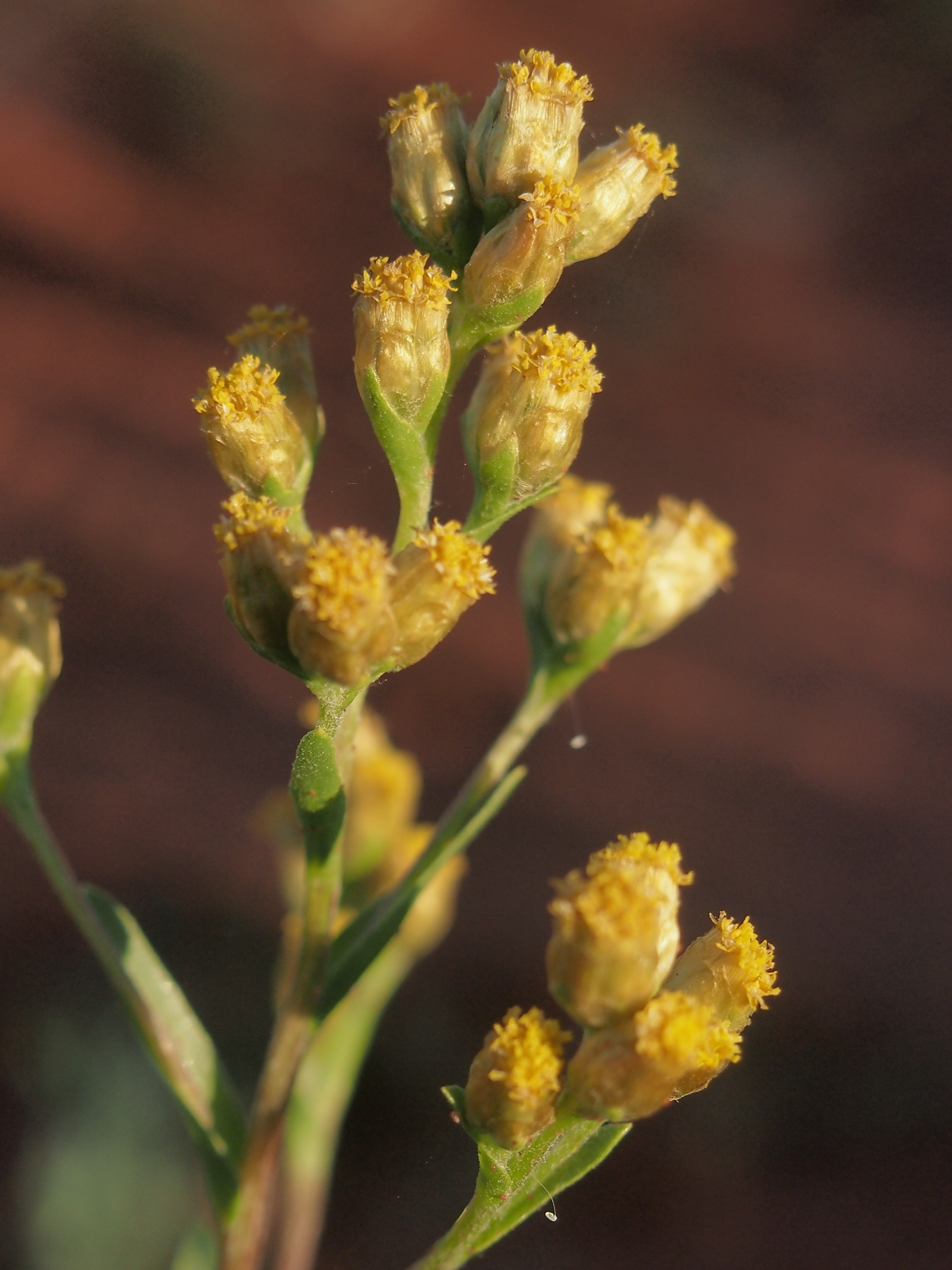
Rhodanthe charsleyae flowers

== Behaviour ==
The adults are flying mellivores. Flowering plants visited by the bees include Calotis multicaulis and Rhodanthe charsleyae, as well as Acacia species.

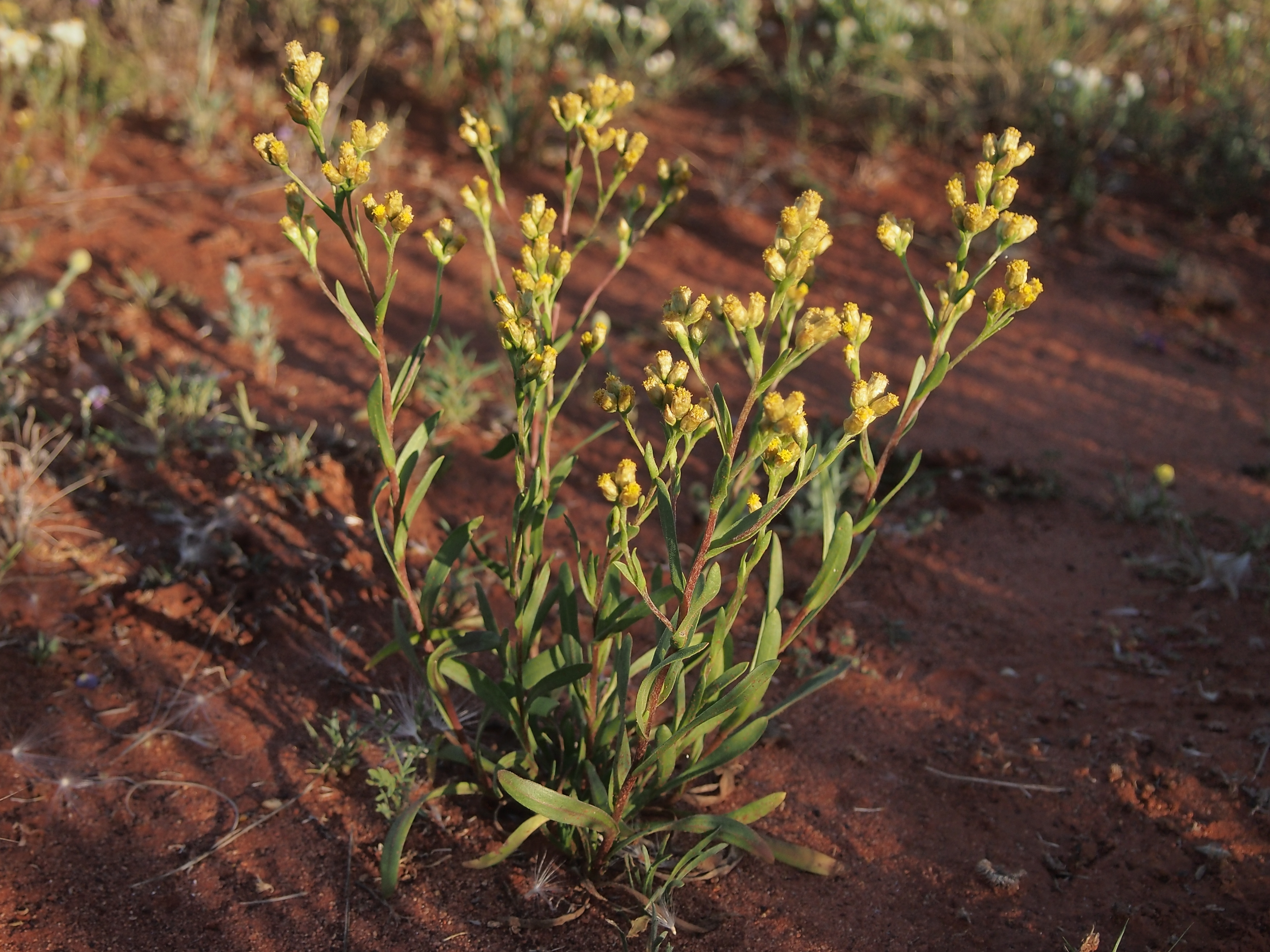
Rhodanthe charsleyae (Charles daisy), a forage plant of the bees
