= Mount Magnet Airport =

Airport in Western Australia

- IATA: MMG; ICAO: YMOG

Summary
- Airport type: Public
- Operator: Shire of Mount Magnet
- Location: Mount Magnet, Western Australia
- Elevation AMSL: 1,354 ft / 413 m
- Coordinates: 28°06′58″S 117°50′30″E
- Website: http://www.mtmagnet.wa.gov.au/default.asp?documentid=103

Map
- Location in Western Australia

Runways
Direction	Length		Surface
Direction	m	ft	Surface
16/34	1,800	5,906	Asphalt
04/22	900	2,953	Gravel
- Sources: Australian AIP and aerodrome chart

Mount Magnet Airport (IATA: MMG, ICAO: YMOG) is an airport at Mount Magnet, Western Australia. The airport received over $400,000 for security updates in 2006. The funds were allocated for a secure baggage area, fencing, lighting, and connecting the airport to the Mt Magnet power grid.

== Airlines and destinations ==
Airlines	Destinations
Skippers Aviation	Charter: Meekatharra, Perth, Wiluna

== See also ==
- List of airports in Western Australia
- Aviation transport in Australia
