= 1900 Western Australian floods =

Natural disaster in Australia

The 1900 Western Australian floods were a series of flooding events from March to May 1900 that affected large areas of Western Australia, primarily in the Pilbara and Gascoyne regions, though it extended to cover most of the state except the more humid Kimberley and South West regions.

The flooding had its beginnings in heavy rain in March 1900 over a very broad area extending from North West Cape to the southeastern corner of the state. It was in the middle of April over the Easter long weekend, however, that flooding began in earnest, and at the end of the month the majority of the normally arid parts of the state were completely inundated: by Easter Monday, all houses in Roebourne were completely surrounded by water from the Harding River.

During April and May, the rain was associated with what was described in the press of the time as "a gentle easterly flow" but today is recognised to be a northwest cloudband. There were several of these cloudbands during the month, and the result was some astonishing rainfall totals, for instance Wiluna received 527.1 millimetres (20.8 in) and Cossack (near Port Hedland) as much as 636.4 millimetres (25.1 in). The heaviest rainfall of all occurred in the Pilbara during the middle of the month, and resulted in rivers such as the Gascoyne, Ashburton and Murchison overflowing their banks for extraordinarily sustained periods. (Unfortunately, there were no gauges at the time so we do not know what the exact heights were).

So heavy indeed was the rainfall that the normally arid "North West" (as the region was known at the time) was completely boggy and the primitive horse-drawn carts could not traverse the country not only in April, but well into May, especially as another major rainband affected the State early that month, with Onslow recording as much as 9.31 inches (236 mm) in a day on the third. The busy Easter mail services were most severely hit of all, with the mail vans from Perth bogged down at Peak Hill after crossing a Gascoyne River that was supposedly 3 miles (4.8 km) wide as the rain extended at the end of Easter to the Murchison River's basin.

Wash-outs on the telegraph line with which the remote regions affected by the floods communicated with Perth were indeed not repaired until well into June, a month after flooding peaked in the Pilbara and Gascoyne and had spread eastward to the goldfields of Western Australia. In the interim, communication about the flooding was delayed almost uniformly by at least three or four days, aided by a severe famine and shortage of food for pack horses and salt lakes in the Goldfields such as Lake Carnegie and Lake Maitland filled for probably the only time in centuries - they were never seen with any water between the first European settlement of Western Australia and these floods were thus unprecedented for an extremely long period of time.
