= Warri and Yatungka =

Isolated Aboriginal couple

Warri (1909–1979) and Yatungka (1919–1979) were an Aboriginal couple from the Mandildjara tribe (a Martu people) of the Gibson Desert in Western Australia who spent about 40 years isolated and living nomadically in the Australian desert.

== Story ==
The pair met and subsequently fell in love in the 1930s. They chose to elope due to their relationship being against tribal law. They spent approximately forty years living nomadically in the Gibson Desert. Attempts were made by Warri and Yatungka's tribe to find the pair but these attempts proved futile. They were left to live in the desert as they had moved into the territory of the neighbouring Budijara tribe. In 1976, local Aboriginal elders in Wiluna approached Australian explorer Stan Gratte to mount an expedition to rescue the couple. Gratte led a search with tribal elder Mudjon for the couple which managed to locate them and bring them to Wiluna where they would both die two years later.

At the time, Warri and Yatungka were thought to be the last people living nomadically in the Australian desert. In reality there were several more nomadic Aboriginal people who came out of the desert after Warri and Yatungka, with the final group being the Richters family, who were found in the Great Victoria Desert in 1986.

== Legacy ==
Warri and Yatungka have been referred to as "star-crossed lovers" by the press, who saw their story as Romeo and Juliet-like.

Peasley's The Last of the Nomads (published 1983) is an international best-selling non-fiction book that documents the life of Warri and Yatungka. In 1997, Matthew Kelley produced a documentary inspired by Peasley's book that described Peasley's journey to find Warri and Yatungka. The documentary, that shares the name of Peasley's book, received a nomination for the 1997 Australian Film Institute Award for Best Television Documentary.

Warri and Yatungka's names were used by Paul Jarman as a song title for a piece he composed in 2002 to commemorate the year of the outback.

The phrase "Last of the Nomads" was again used in 2007 as a monument was built in Wiluna to commemorate the life of Warri and Yatungka.
