= Wiluna Airport =

Airport in Western Australia

- IATA: WUN; ICAO: YWLU

Summary
- Airport type: Public
- Operator: Shire of Wiluna
- Location: Wiluna, Western Australia
- Elevation AMSL: 1,649 ft (503 m)
- Coordinates: 26°37′48″S 120°13′12″E

Map
- Location in Western Australia

Runways
Direction	Length		Surface
Direction	m	ft	Surface
15/33	1,811	5,942	Asphalt
03/21	1,219	3,999	Earth
- Sources: Australian AIP and aerodrome chart

Wiluna Airport (IATA: WUN, ICAO: YWLU) is an airport located 2.5 nautical miles (4.6 km; 2.9 mi) south of Wiluna, Western Australia, with two runways (one sealed and one unsealed) and landing lights. It has a small terminal building.

It was in operation in the 1930s.

== Airlines and destinations ==
Airlines	Destinations
Skippers Aviation	Charter: Meekatharra, Mount Magnet, Perth

== See also ==
- List of airports in Western Australia
- Aviation transport in Australia
