= Skippers Aviation =

Australian airline

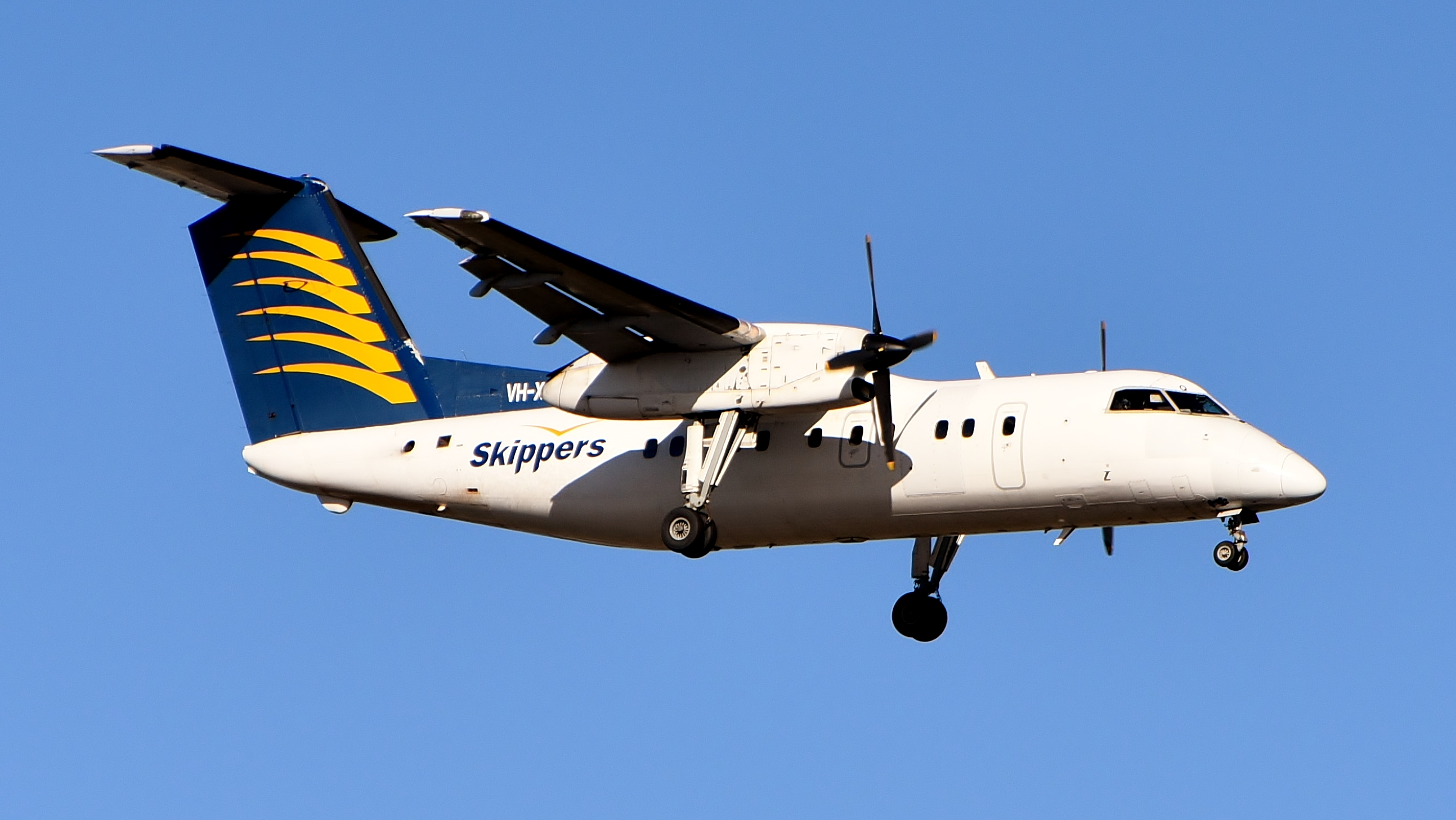
IATA	ICAO	Call sign
HK	—	SKIPPY
- Founded: 1990
- Operating bases: Perth Airport; Broome
- Fleet size: 12
- Destinations: 9 scheduled
- Headquarters: Perth Airport
- Website: www.skippers.com.au

Skippers Aviation is an Australian regional airline based out of Perth Airport that specialises in charter flights for companies with fly-in fly-out workers. It also operate flights for the mining industry in Western Australia, as well as some scheduled regular public transport flights. Primarily serving the northern Goldfields, Skippers also has a secondary base in Broome in order to service the Kimberley region.

== History ==
Skippers Aviation was founded in 1990. It began scheduled services in March 1999 after winning a Government of Western Australia contract to operate flights from Broome to Derby. It held a 25% stake in Hazelton Airlines that was sold to Ansett Transport Industries in 2000. It took over the Perth to Busselton and Margaret River service from Maroomba Airlines on 31 July 2000.

== Services ==
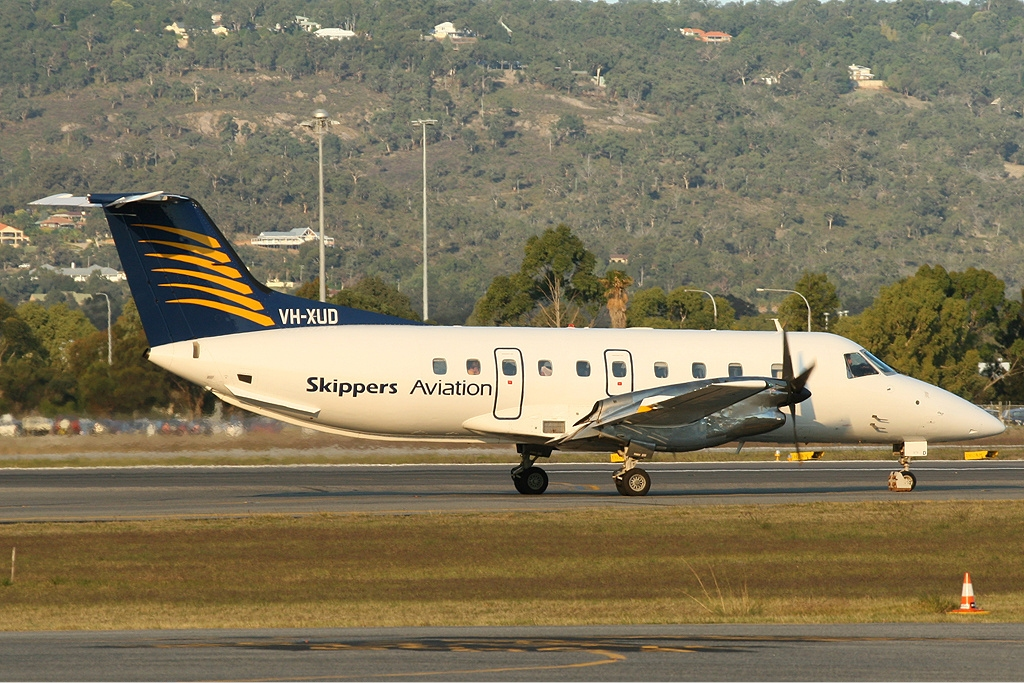
Embraer EMB 120 Brasilia at Perth Airport

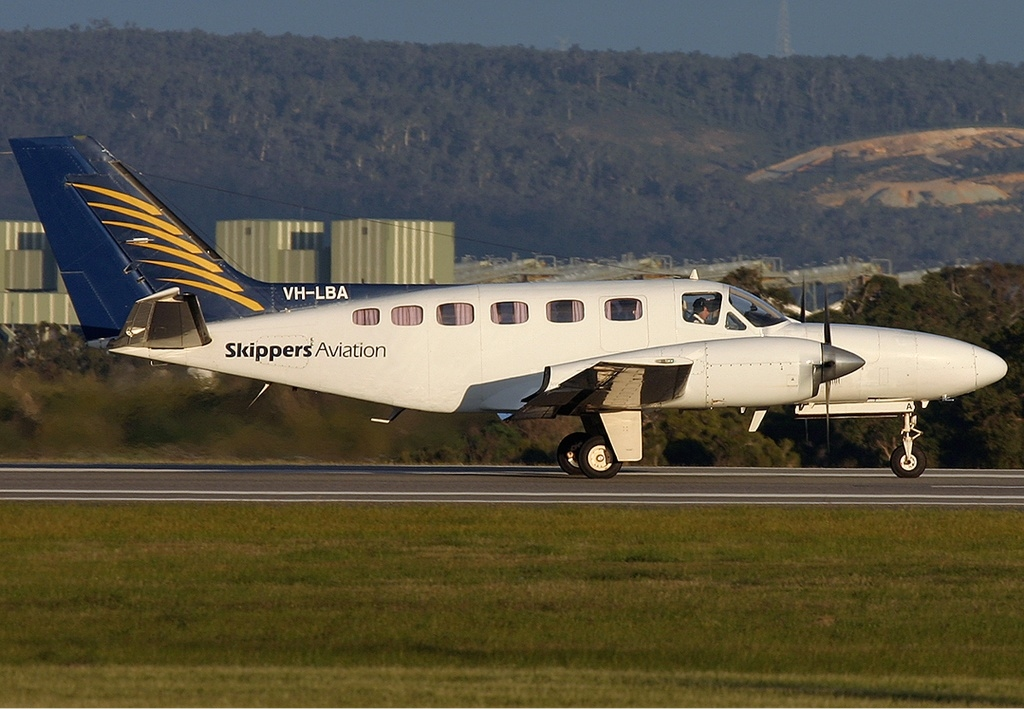
Cessna 441 at Perth Airport

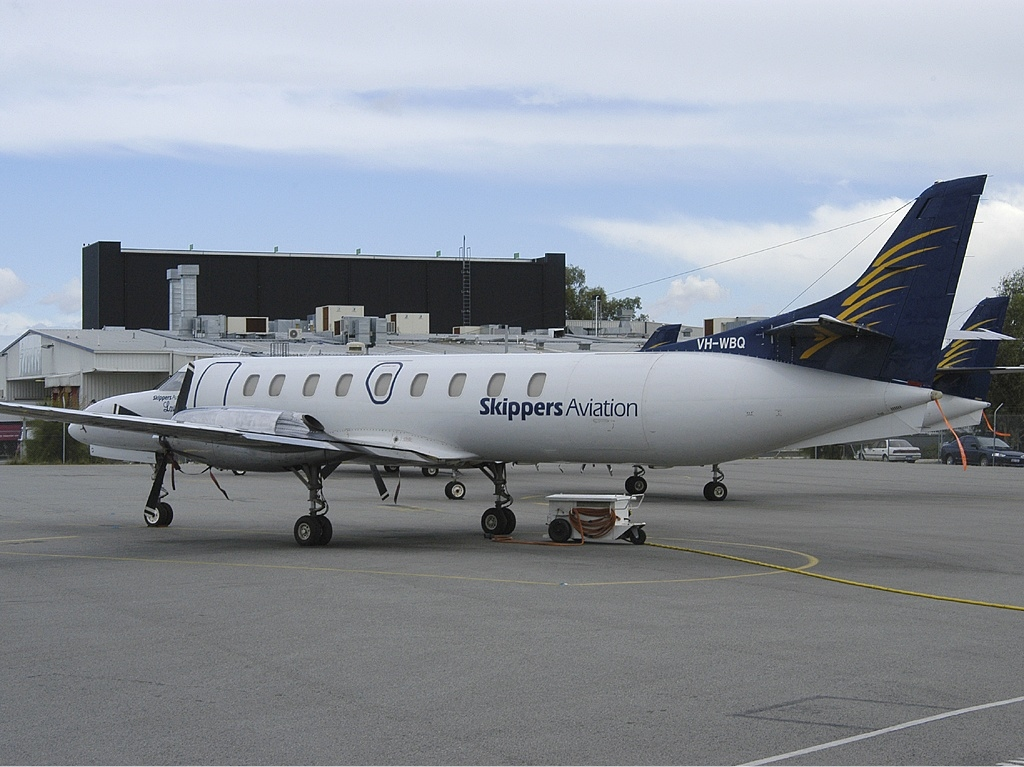
Fairchild Metro

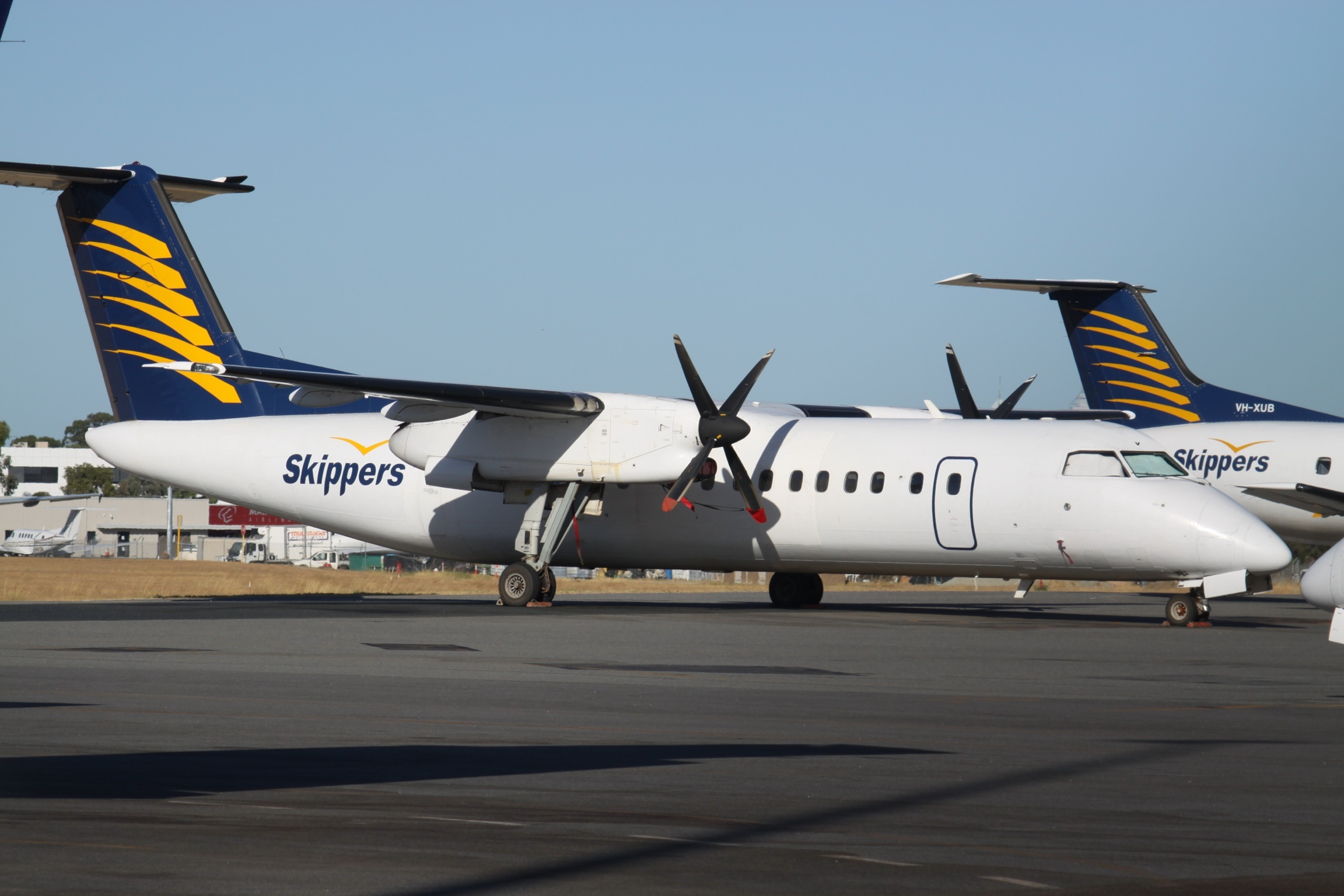
A Dash 8-300 at Perth Airport in 2012

Skippers Aviation is the largest provider of fly-in fly-out services for the mining industry in Western Australia. It operates weekly flights and supports many mining companies and mine sites.

As of January 2020, Skippers Aviation also operates scheduled services to the following regional destinations out of Perth and Broome:

- Fitzroy Crossing
- Halls Creek
- Laverton
- Leonora
- Meekatharra
- Mount Magnet
- Wiluna

== Fleet ==
As of August 2019, the Skippers Aviation fleet consists of 26 aircraft:

- 3 Cessna 441 Conquest II (based out of Broome)
- 4 de Havilland Canada DHC-8-100 Dash 8
- 6 de Havilland Canada/Bombardier DHC-8-300 Dash 8
- 6 Embraer EMB 120ER Brasilia (Fleet placed into long-term storage December 2020)
- 5 Fairchild SA227-DC Metro 23
- 2 Fokker 100

== Incidents ==
On 26 June 2007, an Embraer Brasilia (VH-XUE) on a charter flight was executing a go-around at Jundee Airstrip in Western Australia. During the go-around the crew experienced difficulties in controlling the aircraft, with the aircraft descending to 50 feet above the ground and the bank angle reaching 40 degrees. After regaining control, the crew realised that the left engine had stopped. The cause of the engine stoppage was fuel starvation.

On 19 March 2014, a De Havilland DHC-8 (VH-XFX) approaching Perth had a "near-miss" with an object that was moving towards the aircraft. The crew identified visually the object, which was not detected by the TCAS, and took evasive action to avoid collision. Though presumed to be a UAV, the Australian Transport Safety Bureau (ATSB) investigation was unable to confirm the nature of the object. The ATSB raised concerns about risks posed by unregulated operation of UAVs.
