= Meekatharra Airport =

- IATA: MKR; ICAO: YMEK

Summary
- Airport type: Public
- Operator: Shire of Meekatharra
- Location: Meekatharra, Western Australia
- Elevation AMSL: 1,713 ft (522 m)
- Coordinates: 26°36′42″S 118°32′52″E

Map
- Location in Western Australia

Runways
Direction	Length		Surface
Direction	m	ft	Surface
09/27	2,181	7,156	Asphalt
15/33	1,065	3,494	Earth
- Sources: Australian AIP and aerodrome chart

Meekatharra Airport (IATA: MKR, ICAO: YMEK) is an airport in Meekatharra, Western Australia.

== Historic context ==
The airport was utilised in the 1930s in early stages of flight into the North West and Pilbara regions of Western Australia.

== Airlines and destinations ==
Airlines	Destinations
Airnorth	Charter: Perth
National Jet Express	Charter: Perth
Skippers Aviation	Charter: Mount Magnet, Perth

== See also ==
- List of airports in Western Australia
- Aviation transport in Australia
