= Wiluna uranium mine =

Proposed mine in Western Australia

Coordinates: 26°50′02″S 120°21′38″E

The Wiluna uranium mine is a proposed uranium mine in Western Australia. The mine project, owned by Toro Energy Ltd, is located 30 kilometres (19 mi) south of the mining town of Wiluna. The original proposal was to establish open cut mines at Lake Way and Centipede deposits. In 2013, the Wiluna project became the first uranium mine to receive all necessary approvals in the state of Western Australia since the ban on uranium mining was repealed there in 2008. Federal environmental approval for the mine's development was granted under the EPBC Act in April 2013.

== Status ==
Toro Energy had planned to commission and construct the mine in 2013 and make their first sales in 2014 or 2015 but as of 2020, mining is yet to commence.

The project has sought extensions to the original project to include additional deposits Lake Maitland and Millipede. An expansion of the project was approved by the EPA in 2016.

The mine was originally proposed to operate for 14 years, producing 1,200 tonnes (1,300 short tons) of uranium oxide over that period, though more recent projects suggest 16 years of mining potential.

Once operating, containers of uranium oxide would be transported to Port Adelaide and exported from there.
