= Wiluna, Western Australia =

Town in Mid West region of Western Australia

Wiluna
- Town
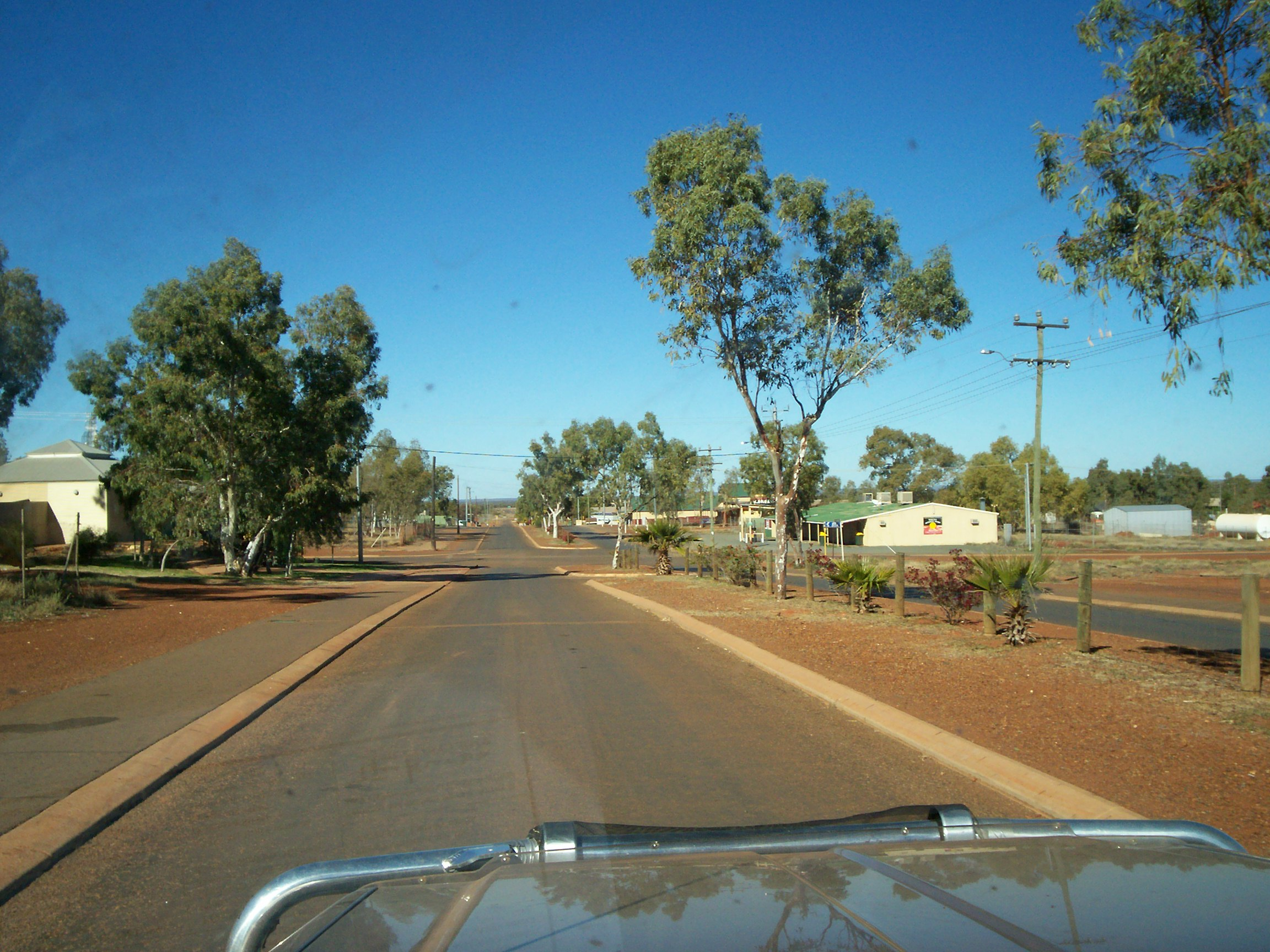
- Main Street in Wiluna

- Interactive map of Wiluna
- Coordinates: 26°35′42″S 120°13′30″E
- Country: Australia
- State: Western Australia
- LGA: Shire of Wiluna
- Location: 947 km (588 mi) NE of Perth; 182 km (113 mi) E of Meekatharra
- Established: 1898

Government
  - State electorate: North West Central
  - Federal division: O'Connor

Area
  - Total: 35,984.5 km^{2} (13,893.7 sq mi)
- Elevation: 521 m (1,709 ft)

Population
  - Total: 240 (UCL 2021)
- Postcode: 6646
- Mean max temp: 29.2 °C (84.6 °F)
- Mean min temp: 14.3 °C (57.7 °F)
- Annual rainfall: 257.4 mm (10.13 in)

Wiluna is a small town in the Goldfields-Esperance region (since 2021) of Western Australia. It is situated on the edge of the Western Desert at the gateway to the Canning Stock Route and Gunbarrel Highway. It is the service centre of the local area for the local Martu people, the pastoral industry, the Wiluna Gold Mine, and many more people who work on other mines in the area on a "fly-in/fly-out" basis.

Wiluna's climate is hot and dry, with an annual rainfall of 258 mm (10.2 in). Mean maximum temperatures range from 19 °C (66 °F) in July, to 38 °C (100 °F) in January.

The closest service centre is in Meekatharra.

== Overview ==
Wiluna has from 200 to 600 Aboriginal people living within its community, depending upon the nature, time and place of the traditional law ceremonies across the Central Desert region. The traditional Aboriginal owners (a grouping known as the Martu) were "settled" as a consequence of the British colonisation process that began in the 1800s. In the 1950s a church-based group were supported by the government of the day to establish a mission. The traditional people lost their lands through many different processes, including the issuing of pastoral leases, the discovery of gold and the influx of non-Aboriginal people onto their lands.

Before and after the atomic nuclear testing near Maralinga in South Australia in the 1950s, many Aboriginal people from at least three different tribal and language groups were forced to live within the mission site. This created many conflicts and the legacy continues today. Much traditional knowledge and skill exists today amongst the Aboriginal residents and visitors.

The existence of a historical Club Hotel, a dilapidated relic of the town's former heyday, created much conflict with many people opposed to its presence as an operating pub arising from the conflict and trauma associated with alcohol abuse.

In 2019, a major renovation converted the Club Hotel into the Shire of Wiluna administration buildings.

The town also has a general store, petrol station, caravan park, sports oval, public swimming pool, school, and health clinic.

Local water holes are much damaged and overused after years of cattle use.

During the wet season, large lakes may form that attract an array of wildlife. The region has snakes, kangaroos, bungarras (large lizard/goanna), bush turkeys, donkeys, horses, camels and dingoes.

Willuna is home to VMW, a marine weather transmitter operated by the Bureau of Meteorology.

Parts of the unsealed and flood-prone road between Wiluna and Meekatharra, the Goldfields Highway, are as of July 2020 being sealed, as part of a pilot program in which the Government of Western Australia provided A$1 million for road work contractors in collaboration with the Martu-ku Yiwarra Training Centre.

=== Mines ===
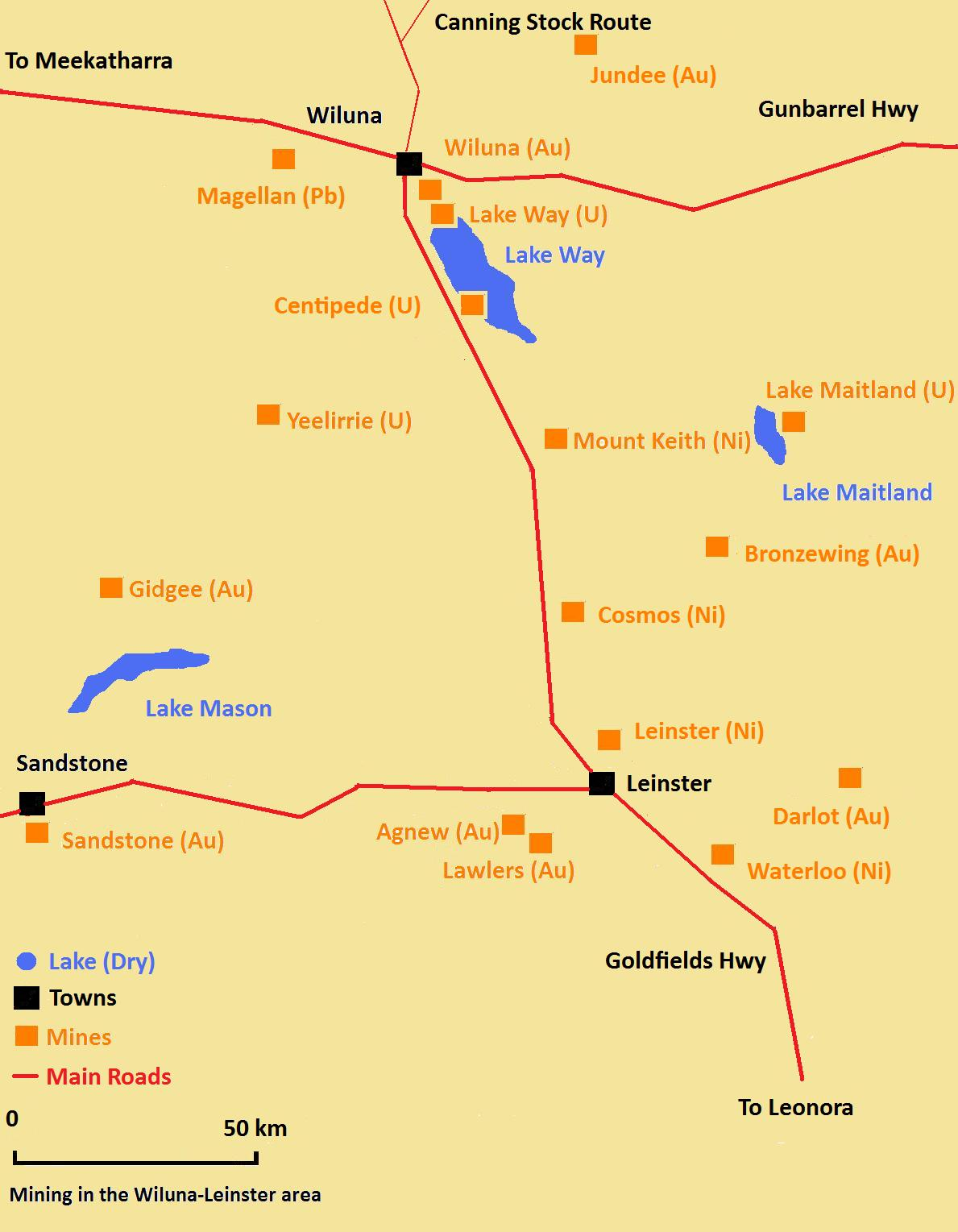
Mining in the Wiluna-Leinster area.

The Wiluna area was explored by Lawrence Wells in 1892. Gold was discovered in the area in 1896, and within a few months over 300 prospectors were in the area. The town of Wiluna was gazetted in 1898, the name Wiluna being the Wati (Aboriginal language) name for the area. By the 1930s, the town had a population of over 9,000 people, but World War II severely affected the gold mining industry, and many mines were shut down. By 1963 the population had fallen to less than 100. Gold mining resumed in the area in 1981.

The closest mine site to town is the Wiluna Gold Mine, approximately 3 km (1.9 mi) south of Wiluna. The mine is operated by Wiluna Mining Corporation and currently produces gold from re-processing of legacy mine tailings.

Yeleeri site, located 100 km (62 mi) south has uranium ore, and the region boasts much mineral wealth.

The Paroo Station lead carbonate open pit mine is located 30 km (19 mi) west of Wiluna. As of January 2015 it was being placed into care and maintenance due to low global prices for lead.

Wiluna and the Mid-West region are the site of Western Australia's most advanced uranium mining projects. Three projects are in the approval process, with the Lake Maitland uranium project and the Lake Way uranium project both owned by Toro Energy Ltd, and the Yeelirrie uranium project which BHP Billiton sold to Cameco. All three are located within 100 km (62 mi) of Wiluna. All three projects were opposed by environmental groups and some local people. Yeelirrie is most fiercely opposed, with over 40 years of clear opposition from traditional owners.

=== Meteors ===
In October 1960, two station workers named Fred Vincenti and Frank Quadrio were opening a fence gate on the Millbillillie-Jundee track 11 km (6.8 mi) from Wiluna when they witnessed a bright fireball falling into spinifex (Triodia) grassland to the north. The debris from this meteor became known as the Millbillillie meteorite and is understood to be pieces of the asteroid Vesta that had at some point been knocked off by a collision in the asteroid belt. Although no official specimens were recovered until 1970 it is understood that members of the local Aboriginal community had collected pieces.

Another meteorite fall was recorded near Wiluna on 2 September 1967. This meteorite was a H5-class object; specimens were collected and housed in the Western Australian Museum.

== Education ==
Wiluna Remote Community School is a school that provides education for students from year 1–12, currently having a student population of between 85 and 115 students.

The school provides a bus as transport to and from the school for the students. The indigenous language of the area is Martu Wangka dialect, however most students speak Aboriginal English.

== Origin of name ==
An early mining settlement of Lake Way Gold, named after the dry Lake Way south of Wiluna, established around 1896, was called Weeloona, derived from an Aboriginal word meaning Place of wind or Windy place. However, the name is also sometimes claimed to come from the cry of the curlew, which is frequent in the area.

== Geography ==
=== Climate ===
Wiluna experiences a desert climate (Köppen climate classification BWh), though like most of inland Western Australia it has seen its rainfall increase by around 40 percent since 1967. The heaviest rainfall, however, was associated with the April 1900 floods when the town received 527.1 mm (20.75 in), two-and-a-half-times its normal annual rainfall.

Climate data for Wiluna (1901–2019); 521 m AMSL; 26° 35′ 29.04″ S
Month	Jan	Feb	Mar	Apr	May	Jun	Jul	Aug	Sep	Oct	Nov	Dec	Year
Record high °C (°F)	48.0 (118.4)	46.8 (116.2)	44.0 (111.2)	40.0 (104.0)	37.2 (99.0)	32.2 (90.0)	29.7 (85.5)	33.4 (92.1)	37.5 (99.5)	42.9 (109.2)	43.3 (109.9)	47.0 (116.6)	48.0 (118.4)
Mean daily maximum °C (°F)	38.0 (100.4)	36.6 (97.9)	34.0 (93.2)	29.3 (84.7)	23.9 (75.0)	19.9 (67.8)	19.5 (67.1)	22.0 (71.6)	26.4 (79.5)	30.5 (86.9)	34.0 (93.2)	36.9 (98.4)	29.3 (84.6)
Mean daily minimum °C (°F)	23.0 (73.4)	22.2 (72.0)	19.7 (67.5)	15.2 (59.4)	10.0 (50.0)	6.7 (44.1)	5.4 (41.7)	6.8 (44.2)	10.0 (50.0)	13.9 (57.0)	17.9 (64.2)	21.1 (70.0)	14.3 (57.8)
Record low °C (°F)	8.3 (46.9)	12.1 (53.8)	9.4 (48.9)	3.9 (39.0)	−0.6 (30.9)	−2.0 (28.4)	−2.2 (28.0)	−2.3 (27.9)	1.2 (34.2)	4.2 (39.6)	4.4 (39.9)	8.3 (46.9)	−2.3 (27.9)
Average precipitation mm (inches)	37.2 (1.46)	38.7 (1.52)	36.0 (1.42)	28.6 (1.13)	25.1 (0.99)	23.6 (0.93)	14.7 (0.58)	9.9 (0.39)	5.0 (0.20)	7.3 (0.29)	12.1 (0.48)	22.1 (0.87)	260.3 (10.26)
Average precipitation days (≥ 0.2 mm)	4.5	4.3	4.7	3.8	4.0	4.8	3.9	2.8	1.6	1.8	2.8	3.5	42.5
Source: Australian Bureau of Meteorology

== Railways ==
Wiluna was the furthest away from Perth that the narrow gauge Western Australian Government Railways system reached. The Wiluna branch was connected to the main Northern Railway at Meekatharra. The branch opened to Wiluna on 2 November 1932. The line was closed on 5 August 1957.

== People from Wiluna ==
The Indigenous people who have always lived in the region come from different tribal groups. Accomplished hunters, crafts people, pastoralists, bush mechanics and people with many other skills exist today within the community.

The former Governor-General of Australia, Major General Michael Jeffery was born in Wiluna on 12 December 1937. A new primary school was constructed in Wiluna after Jeffery visited the town in 2006 and criticised the condition of the existing school.

Warri and Yatungka were a famous Aboriginal couple who died in Wiluna in 1979. They were the last of the Mandildjara people to leave their country and the hunter-gatherer lifestyle. Their Romeo and Juliet-like story was recorded in the best-selling book The Last of the Nomads by Dr W J Peasley. This story is recounted as Peasley, organising the expedition, although it was Stan Gratte of Geraldton (OAM) who organised this party to recover them when urged by Warri's brother Moodjeren, who was concerned, due to old age and the lack of young people who would normally assist the elderly, they would not survive the extended drought which was now gripping Central Australia. Emaciated and likely close to death, the couple were brought to Wiluna where they were forgiven by their people for breaking the Mandildjara marriage laws decades before. They died in 1979 within four weeks of each other.

== See also ==
- Wiluna Airport

== Sources ==
- Liberman, Kenneth (Spring 1980). "The Decline of the Kuwarra People of Australia's Western Desert: A Case Study of Legally Secured Domination". Ethnohistory. 27 (2): 119–133. doi:10.2307/481223. JSTOR 481223.
