= Sunstate Airlines =

Regional airline of Australia

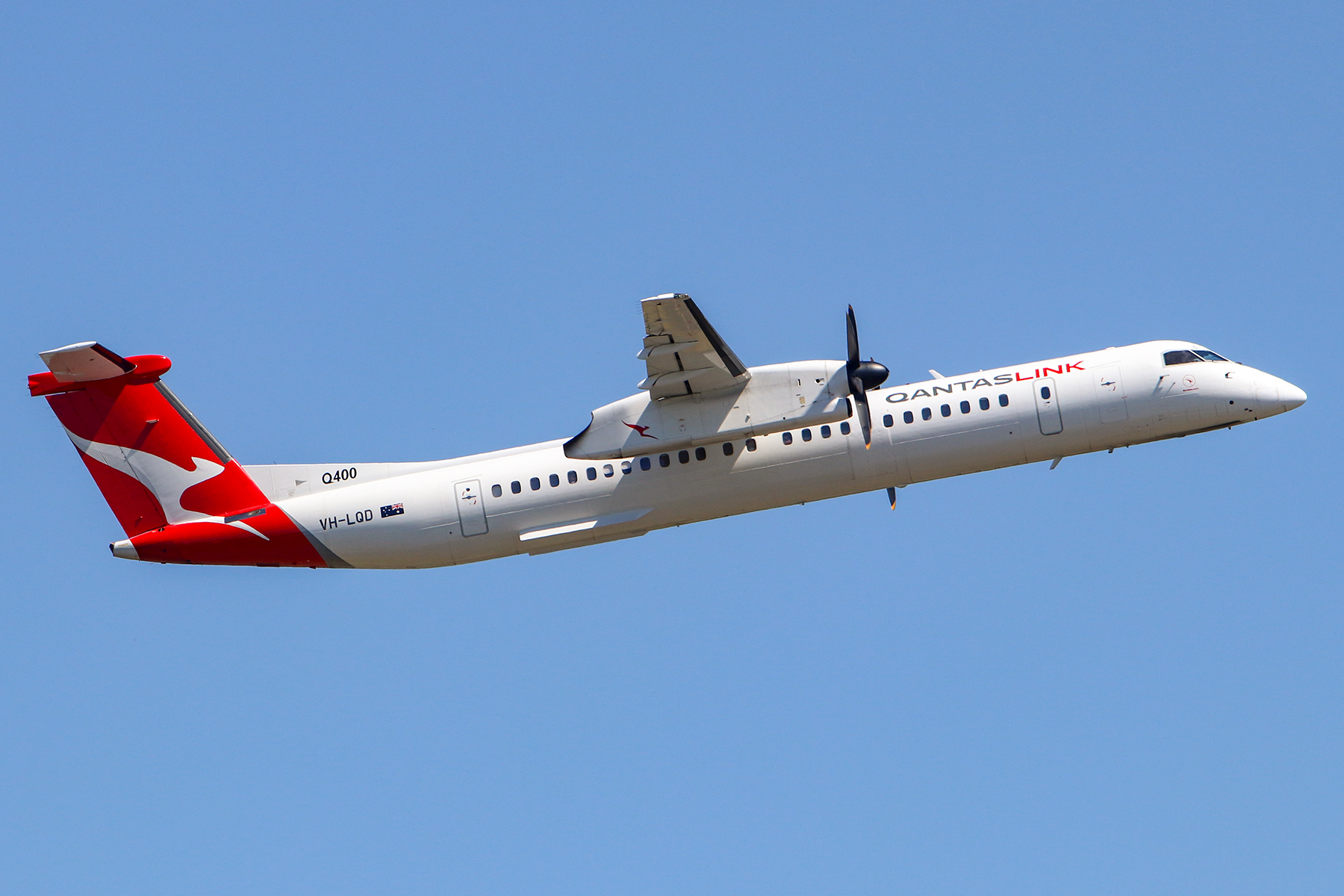
- Sunstate Airlines De Havilland Canada Dash 8
IATA	ICAO	Call sign
—	QLK	Q-LINK
- Founded: 1981; 45 years ago
- AOC #: CASA.AOC.0004
- Operating bases: Adelaide; Brisbane; Cairns
- Frequent-flyer program: Qantas Frequent Flyer
- Alliance: Oneworld (affiliate)
- Fleet size: 36
- Destinations: 46
- Parent company: Qantas
- Headquarters: Mascot, New South Wales, Australia

Sunstate Airlines is a subsidiary of Qantas which operates regional flights under the QantasLink banner throughout New South Wales, Queensland, Victoria and to Canberra, Australian Capital Territory. Its head office is in Mascot, New South Wales, Australia.

== History ==
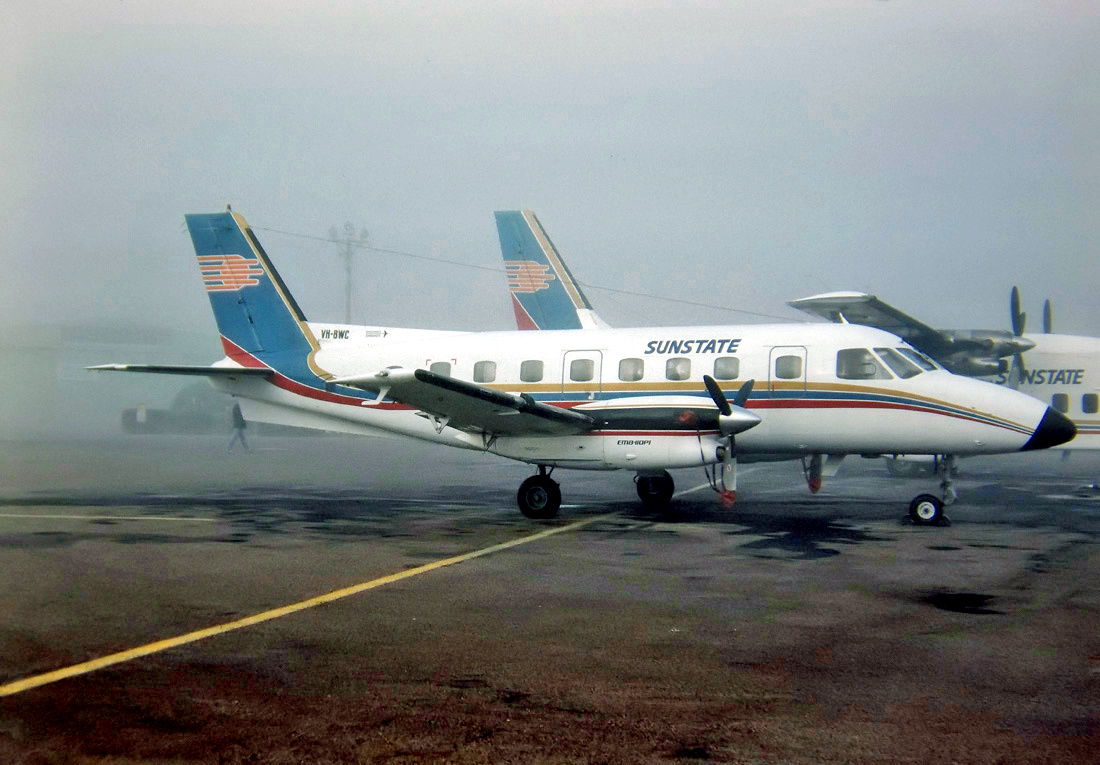
A former Sunstate Airlines Embraer EMB 110 Bandeirante in 1988

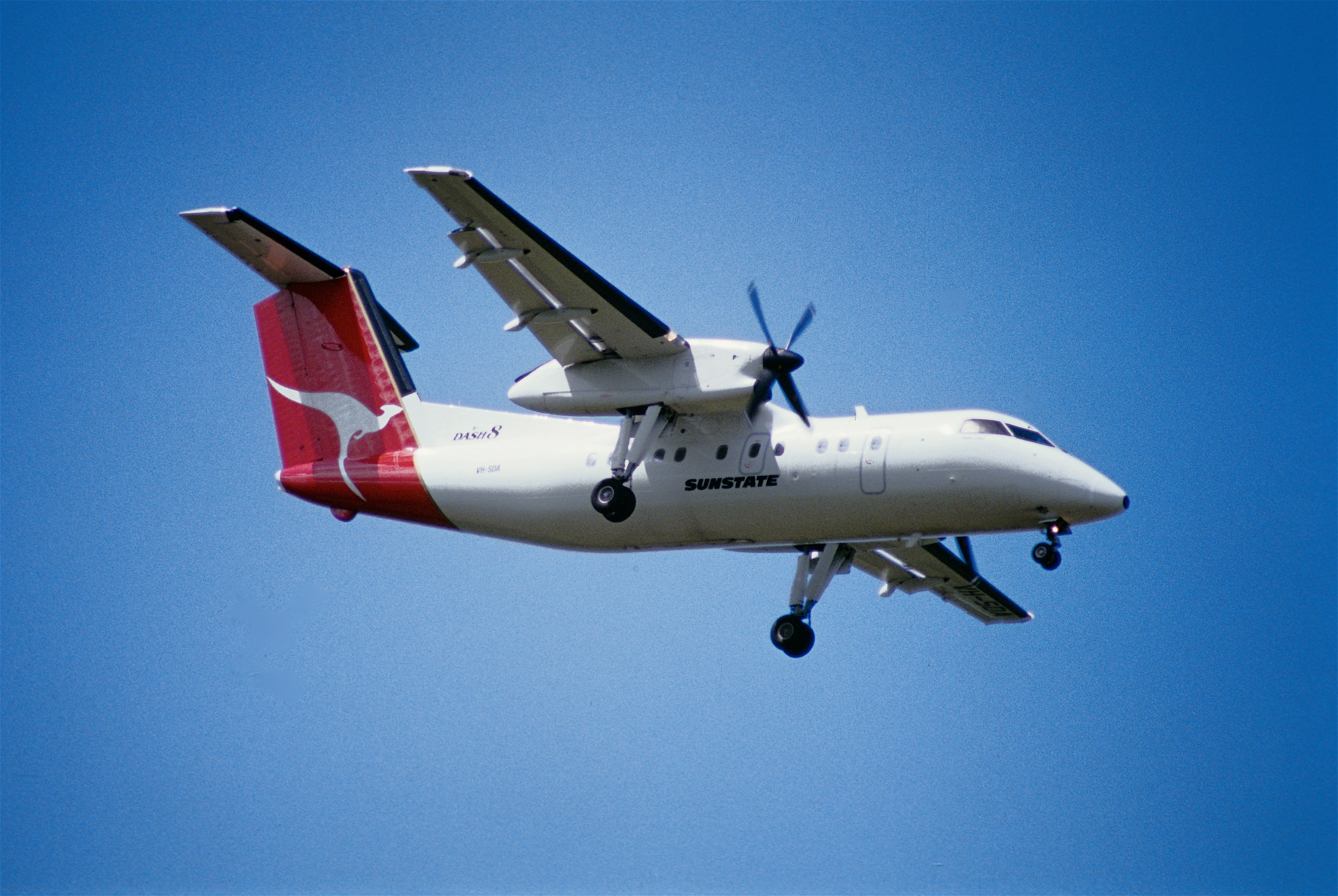
A former Sunstate Airlines De Havilland Canada Dash 8-200 in 1999

The company's roots extend back to 1975, when Noosa Air began operating in December of that year between Noosa and Brisbane using a Britten-Norman Islander. Maryborough businessman Bevan Whitaker, owner of the parent company of Noosa Air, Whitaker Pty Ltd, set up a second airline that commenced operations in December 1981, serving intrastate routes in Queensland vacated by Trans Australia Airlines (TAA) with Embraer EMB 110 Bandeirante aircraft. This second airline was called Sunstate Airlines.

Initially the two airlines used separate airline codes. In 1983, Sunstate changed its code to that of Noosa Air, and by the end of the year, the two airlines had merged fully. From 1 January 1984, all flights were conducted under the Sunstate name as part of TAA's Queensland network. The diverse, combined fleet consisted of two Islanders, two Bandeirantes, three de Havilland Canada DHC-6 Twin Otters and a Short 330. Within a few months, the Islanders and the Short 330 were replaced by a GAF N.24A Nomad and a Short 360, with the Islanders going to associated company Whitaker Air Services.

In 1986, Sunstate purchased a share in Victorian airline, Mildura-based Murray Valley Airlines (MVA), which was established in 1975 but ceased operations in October 1986 due to financial problems. Operations recommenced on 9 November 1986 as Sunstate Airlines (Mildura) on the old MVA routes from Mildura to Melbourne, to Adelaide via Renmark, and to Broken Hill. The airline now had two unconnected networks. The following year Sunstate expanded in its original territory when financially troubled Air Queensland gave up its routes in South East Queensland; Sunstate took over these routes on 1 June. The airline had prepared for the route handover by acquiring more aircraft, its fleet by then consisted of four Nomads (two N24As and two N.22s), three Bandeirantes, three Twin Otters, two Short 360s and a Short 330 in Queensland; and a Short 360 and Cessna 404 in Victoria.

In 1989, Australian Airlines, the successor to TAA and previously the owner of now-defunct Air Queensland, took a one-third share in Sunstate. Shortly afterwards, Sunstate commenced operations out of Cairns and the fleet was somewhat rationalised, now consisting of 3 Short 360s, 2 Short 330s, 2 Twin Otters, and a Bandeirante transferred from the Mildura operation. Meanwhile, Sunstate Airlines (Mildura) was awarded a five-year contract to operate air ambulance flights on behalf of the Ambulance services of Victoria. To serve the contract it took a Cessna 404 the Queensland operation had acquired from the break-up of Air Queensland, its own Cessna 404, and four others. To maintain its airline operations a succession of Cessna 404s were leased one at a time from Eastern Australia Airlines, Australian Airlines' regional subsidiary in New South Wales.

=== 1990s ===
In October 1990, Australian Airlines become the outright owner of Sunstate Airlines and Sunstate Airlines (Mildura). The Mildura operation was subsequently rebranded as Southern Australia Airlines, commencing operations under that name on 1 January 1992. The following month it took delivery of its first pressurised aircraft, a de Havilland Canada DHC-8-100 Dash 8. A second Dash 8 was delivered in March 1992 and the Short 360 was transferred to Sunstate Airlines in July. Southern Australia used the Dash 8s to expand its services, taking over Eastern Australia Airlines routes across Bass Strait from Melbourne to Launceston and Devonport in Tasmania.

Sunstate took delivery of three additional Dash 8s, placing them in service in mid 1992, and took over more routes from Australian Regional Airlines of Queensland, another Australian Airlines subsidiary operating in Queensland that rose after the demise of Air Queensland. It also commenced operations from Brisbane into New South Wales, flying once a week to Lord Howe Island from 20 September 1992. Both Southern Australia and Sunstate also started using Australian Airlines' 'TN' airline code for all of their services following the purchase.

On 1 October 1993, Sunstate absorbed Australian Regional Airlines, taking over its fleet and routes. Before and after the takeover Sunstate rationalised its fleet, now having the three Dash 8s, four Short 360s and five Twin Otters. At the end of that month, both Southern Australia and Sunstate changed airline codes again, now operating with the 'QF' of Qantas after that airline shut down Australian Airlines on 30 October. Qantas now found itself with some of the smallest aircraft in the Australian airline industry (Southern Australia's 2 Cessna 404s) and the biggest in the industry (its Boeing 747s and 767s and the former Australian Airlines Airbus A300s). Following Australian Airlines' ceasing operations, Southern Australia commenced flying between Melbourne and Canberra.

In the mid 1990s, both Southern Australia and Sunstate expanded steadily. In 1994, Southern Australia's air ambulance contract was renewed for another five years. Its fleet was expanded in December 1996 when it took delivery of two British Aerospace BAe 146s, using them to commence operations on trunk routes from Hobart and Launceston to Sydney, Melbourne and Adelaide. In 1998, Southern Australia withdrew from the Mildura - Broken Hill route in July, and from Mildura to Adelaide via Renmark in October, and the two airline Cessna 404s were taken out of service. The air ambulance contract and aircraft were taken over by the Royal Flying Doctor Service from 1 November that year.

By the end of 1997, Sunstate added another Dash 8 and more Short 360s, so that it was operating four of the former and eight of the latter, along with the five Twin Otters, to a network of 21 destinations in Queensland and New South Wales (including to Newcastle from May). The following year the Twin Otters and three Short 360s were withdrawn after Qantas sold the portfolio of islands in the Great Barrier Reef it had inherited from Australian Airlines (Brampton Island, Dunk Island, Great Keppel Island and Lizard Island); and a DHC-8-200 was added.

=== 2000–present ===
In 2001, both Sunstate and Southern Australia (as well as Eastern Australia Airlines, Impulse Airlines and National Jet Systems' Airlink operation) were rebranded as QantasLink, though each entity retained a certain amount of independence. The Southern Australia name subsequently disappeared when it was absorbed into Eastern Australia Airlines.

Also, in 2001, Sunstate began re-equipping with the Bombardier Dash 8 Q300. It eventually received six Q300s and disposed of its remaining Short 360s, thereby achieving an all-Dash 8 fleet. In 2006, Sunstate took delivery of seven Bombardier Dash 8 Q400. Five were placed in service on its Queensland routes, while two were used to commence new services between Sydney and Canberra. The Q400 fleet has since expanded, while the smaller variants of the Dash 8 were transferred to Eastern Australia Airlines, leaving Sunstate Airlines with a fleet of Q400 aircraft.

On 25 June 2024, Qantas announced an order for 14 mid-life Dash 8-400 (Q400) aircraft from WestJet Encore, to be operated by Sunstate Airlines. The first of these aircraft arrived in the QantasLink fleet in December 2024. Once all deliveries are completed, the order will bring the Q400 fleet total to 45, with a single aircraft type providing increased reliability and reducing complexity and cost for the group. The fleet renewal will lead to the Sunstate Airlines subsidiary operating all Dash 8 services for Qantaslink, as the Q200 and Q300 are retired from sister subsidiary, Eastern Australia Airlines.

== Destinations ==
From Adelaide

- Kingscote
- Mount Gambier
- Port Lincoln
- Whyalla

From Brisbane

- Barcaldine
- Blackall
- Bundaberg
- Cairns
- Canberra
- Charleville
- Cooma (seasonal)
- Emerald
- Gladstone
- Hervey Bay
- Longreach
- Miles
- Mackay
- Moranbah
- Newcastle
- Rockhampton
- Roma
- Townsville
- Wagga Wagga

From Cairns

- Horn Island
- Mackay
- Rockhampton
- Townsville
- Weipa

From Townsville

- Cloncurry
- Mount Isa
- Mackay
- Moranbah
- Rockhampton
- Brisbane

From Melbourne

- Albury
- Burnie
- Canberra
- Cooma (seasonal)
- Devonport
- Launceston
- Merimbula (seasonal)
- Mildura
- Wagga Wagga

From Sydney

- Albury
- Armidale
- Ballina (Byron Bay)
- Bendigo
- Broken Hill
- Canberra
- Cooma (seasonal)
- Coffs Harbour
- Dubbo
- Griffith
- Merimbula
- Mildura
- Moree
- Orange
- Port Macquaire
- Tamworth
- Toowoomba
- Wagga Wagga

== Fleet ==
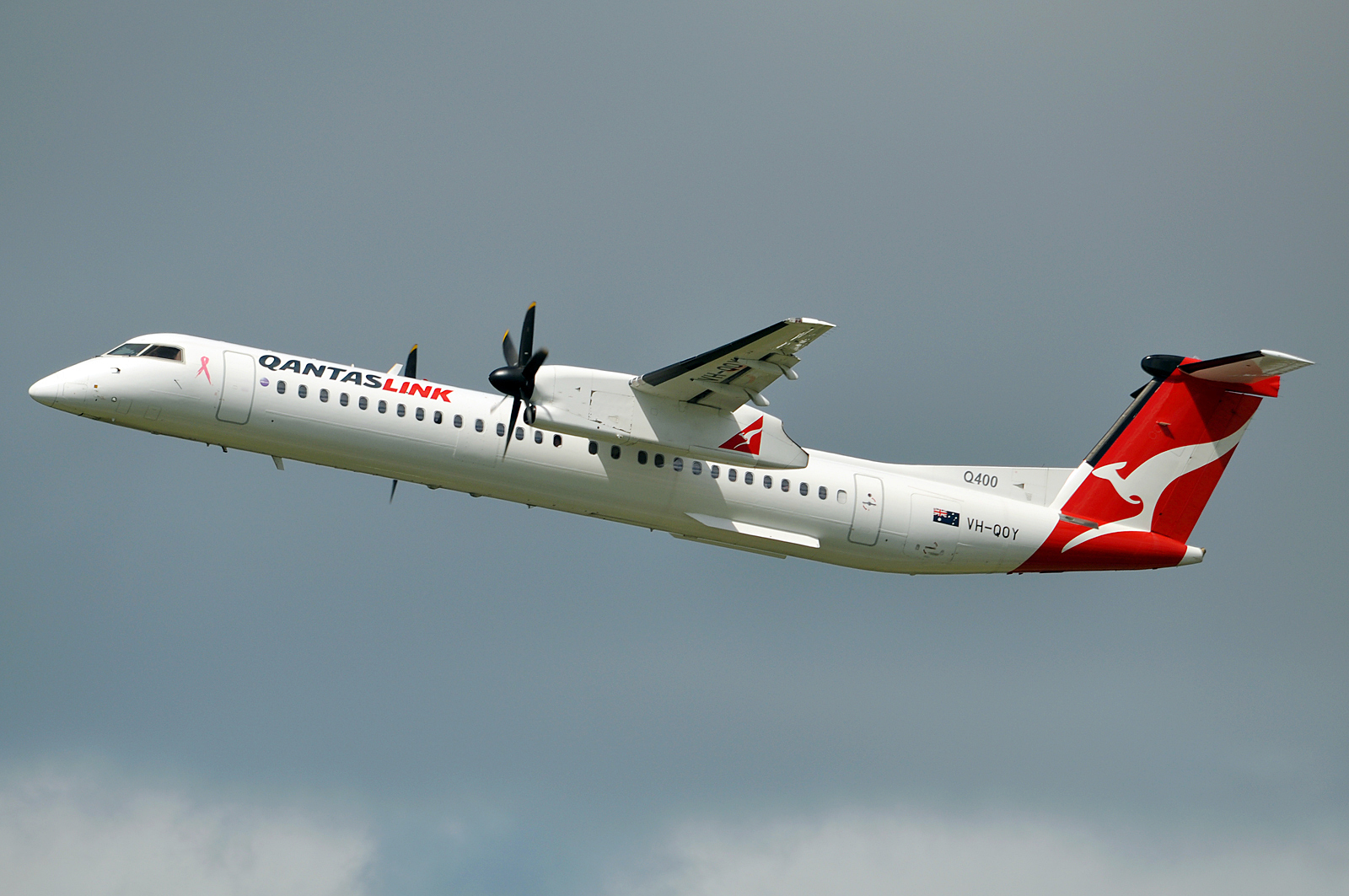
Sunstate Airlines De Havilland Canada Dash 8-400

As of August 2025, Sunstate Airlines operates the following aircraft:

Aircraft	In service	Orders	Passengers	Notes
De Havilland Canada Dash 8-400	30	—	74	
De Havilland Canada Dash 8-400	6	8	78	Mid-Life aircraft delivered from Q4 2024. Former WestJet aircraft.
Total	36	8		
