= Eastern Australia Airlines =

Regional airline of Australia (1949–2025)

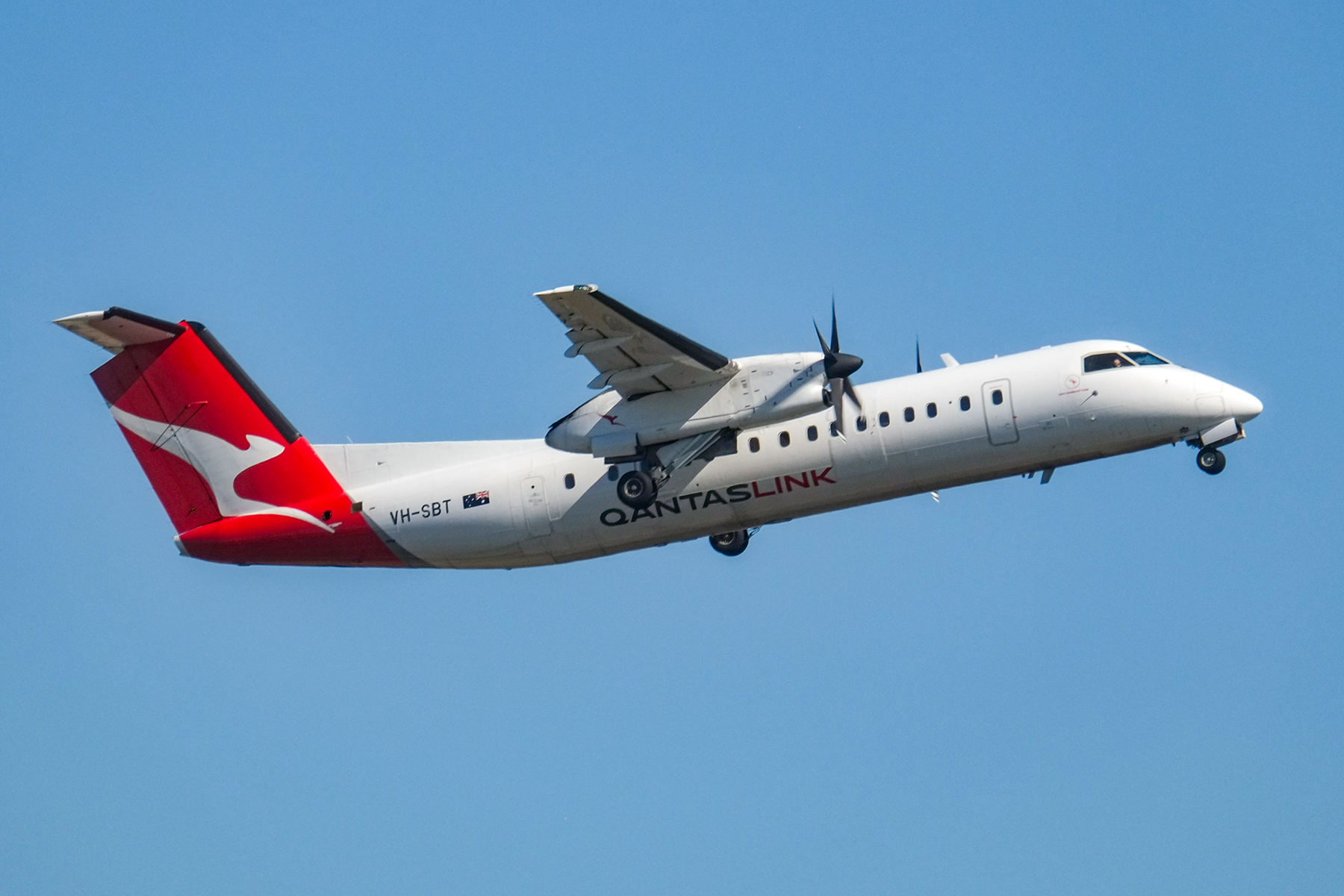
- Eastern Australia Airlines De Havilland Canada Dash 8-300 in 2023
IATA	ICAO	Call sign
—	EAQ	—
- Founded: 1949
- Ceased operations: 8 August 2025
- AOC #: CASA.AOC.0003
- Operating bases: Adelaide; Melbourne; Sydney
- Frequent-flyer program: Qantas Frequent Flyer
- Destinations: 15
- Parent company: Qantas
- Headquarters: Mascot, New South Wales, Australia

Eastern Australia Airlines was an airline based at Sydney Airport in Mascot, New South Wales, Australia. A subsidiary of Qantas, it was a regional domestic airline that served sixteen destinations within Australia under the QantasLink banner.

== History ==
Eastern Australia Airlines was founded by Jim Packer as Tamworth Air Taxi Service that was later abbreviated to Tamair. It commenced operations on 11 August 1949. In 1978, renamed Eastern Coast Airlines, it commenced regulat public transport operations.

In 1984, East-West Airlines purchased a 26% shareholding, with it renamed Eastern Airlines. After Ansett Transport Industries purchased East-West Airlines, the Trade Practices Commission ruled that East-West sell its now 36% shareholding. John Roworth held the remaining shares. In July 1988 East-West's shareholding was purchased by Australian Airlines with the airline renamed Eastern Australia Airlines.

In 1991 Australian Airlines became the sole owner. At this stage it operated nine Dash 8 and Jetstream 31s serving Armidale, Brisbane, Canberra, Cooma, Devonport, Glen Inness, Gold Coast, Grafton, Launceston, Lord Howe Island, Melbourne, Moree, Narrabri, Newcastle, Port Macquarie, Sydney, Tamworth and Taree.

In September 1992 Eastern Australia Airlines became a subsidiary of Qantas after it took over Australian Airlines. In 2002 Qantas merged Southern Australia Airlines into Eastern Australia Airlines.

In August 2008, it was announced that Eastern Australia would shortly commence operating 72-seat Bombardier Dash 8 Q400 aircraft on services to regional centres in New South Wales, supplementing services with smaller 50-seat Dash 8s and allowing the removal of 36-seat Dash 8s from service on some routes altogether with the retirement of all 100 series Dash 8s.

In June 2015, Qantas announced that Eastern Australia would operate regional services in New Zealand, using Jetstar-branded Bombardier Dash 8 turboprops.

In October 2019, Jetstar withdrew from regional flying in New Zealand citing soft demand, higher fuel costs and a loss making operation. Following the withdrawal, the five Jetstar branded Bombardier Dash 8 aircraft were transferred back to Australia.

On 25 June 2024, Qantas announced an order for 14 mid-life Dash 8-400 (Q400) aircraft to be operated by fellow QantasLink airline, Sunstate. This will begin the phasing out of the Q200 and Q300 aircraft, with the fleet replacement leading to all aircraft being retired from the Eastern Australia fleet.

On 8 August 2025, QantasLink operated its last flight with the Q300; it flew between Tamworth and Sydney as flight QF2003. To commemorate the retirement of the Q300, QantasLink operated flight QLK300, a celebratory flight for staff and crew, where the aircraft completed a scenic flight over Sydney and the Harbour Bridge. Following this flight, Eastern is no longer the registered operator of any aircraft on behalf of Qantas, with all regional turboprop flights operated by Sunstate Airlines Q400 aircraft.

== Destinations ==
Eastern Australia Airlines operates services to the following domestic scheduled destinations. Between December 2015 and November 2019, Eastern Australian Airlines operated regional domestic services within New Zealand under the Jetstar brand.

From December 2024, Eastern began gradually winding down its Q300 destinations from Melbourne and Adelaide, when the last aircraft was retired in August 2025 the following destinations were being served from Sydney: .

- Albury
- Armidale
- Bendigo
- Canberra
- Coffs Harbour
- Dubbo
- Griffith
- Merimbula
- Mildura
- Moree
- Orange
- Port Macquarie
- Tamworth
- Toowoomba
- Wagga Wagga

== Fleet ==
As at August 2025, Eastern Australia Airlines operated 17 Dash 8s. It previously operated British Aerospace Jetstream 31s.

== See also ==
- List of defunct airlines of Australia
