= Noosa Airport =

- IATA: NSV; ICAO: YNSH

Summary
- Airport type: Private (formally commercial)
- Owner/Operator: Salt Air Aviation
- Serves: Shire of Noosa, Queensland, Australia
- Location: Noosaville, Queensland, Australia
- Elevation AMSL: 0 ft (0 m)
- Coordinates: 26°25′24″S 153°03′55″E

Map
- Location in Queensland

Runways
Direction	Length		Surface
Direction	m	ft	Surface
11/29	800	2,625	Asphalt

Noosa Airport (IATA: NSV, ICAO: YNSH), is located at Noosaville, Queensland, Australia.

The Noosa Airport is the hub for Salt Air Aviation. It's is also used as an emergency airfield by the Queensland Fire Department

== History ==
The Noosa Airport opened in December 1975 as the hub for Noosa Air, owned by Whitaker Pty Ltd. In 1981, a second airline, Sunstate Airlines, used the airport as its hub before merging with Noosa Air in 1983. Sunstate was also owned by Whitaker Pty Ltd. In the 1980's the airport was closed to fixed-winged aircraft due to its proximity to the Maroochydore Airport. Sunstate Airlines was rebranded QantasLink in 2001.

== See also ==
- List of airports in Queensland
