= Renmark Airport =

Airport in South Australia

- IATA: RMK; ICAO: YREN

Summary
- Airport type: Public
- Operator: Renmark Paringa Council
- Serves: Renmark, South Australia, Australia
- Elevation AMSL: 115 ft / 35 m
- Coordinates: 34°11′48″S 140°40′24″E

Map
- Location in South Australia

Runways
Direction	Length		Surface
Direction	m	ft	Surface
07/25	1,740	5,709	Asphalt
18/36	1,024	3,360	Gravel
07/25	n/a	n/a	n/a
12/30	1,096	3,596	n/a
- Sources: Australian AIP and aerodrome chart

Renmark Airport (IATA: RMK, ICAO: YREN) is an airport serving Renmark, South Australia. It is located 4.25 nautical miles (7.9 km; 4.9 mi) southwest of Renmark and operated by the Renmark Paringa Council.

== Facilities ==
The airport resides at an elevation of 115 ft (35 m) above sea level. It has two main runways: 07/25 with an asphalt surface measuring 1,740 m × 30 m (5,709 ft × 98 ft) and 18/36 with a gravel surface measuring 1,024 m × 30 m (3,360 ft × 98 ft). There are two other runways, 12/30 1,096 m (3,596 ft) and a parallel 07/25. Both of these are marked as being for gliders only.

Commercial flights from Renmark between Adelaide and Mildura were formerly operated by Qantas subsidiary Sunstate Airlines, having been operated with Cessna 404 Titan aircraft from 1986, till the aircraft fleet and route were discontinued in 1998.

== Accidents and incidents ==
The 2017 South Australia Cessna Conquest crash occurred near Renmark airport on 30 May 2017, when a practice flight performed on a Cessna 441 Conquest II plane by charter airline Rossair crashed, killing its three occupants.

== See also ==
- List of airports in South Australia
