= Emerald Airport =

Airport in Queensland, Australia

- IATA: EMD; ICAO: YEML

Summary
- Airport type: Public
- Owner/Operator: Central Highlands Regional Council
- Serves: Emerald, Queensland, Australia
- Elevation AMSL: 624 ft / 190 m
- Coordinates: 23°34′03″S 148°10′45″E

Map
- Location in Queensland

Runways
Direction	Length		Surface
Direction	m	ft	Surface
06/24	1,900	6,234	Asphalt
15/33	926	3,038	Asphalt

Statistics (2014)
- Revenue passengers: 246,074
- Aircraft movements: 5,700
- Sources: Australian AIP and aerodrome chart BITRE

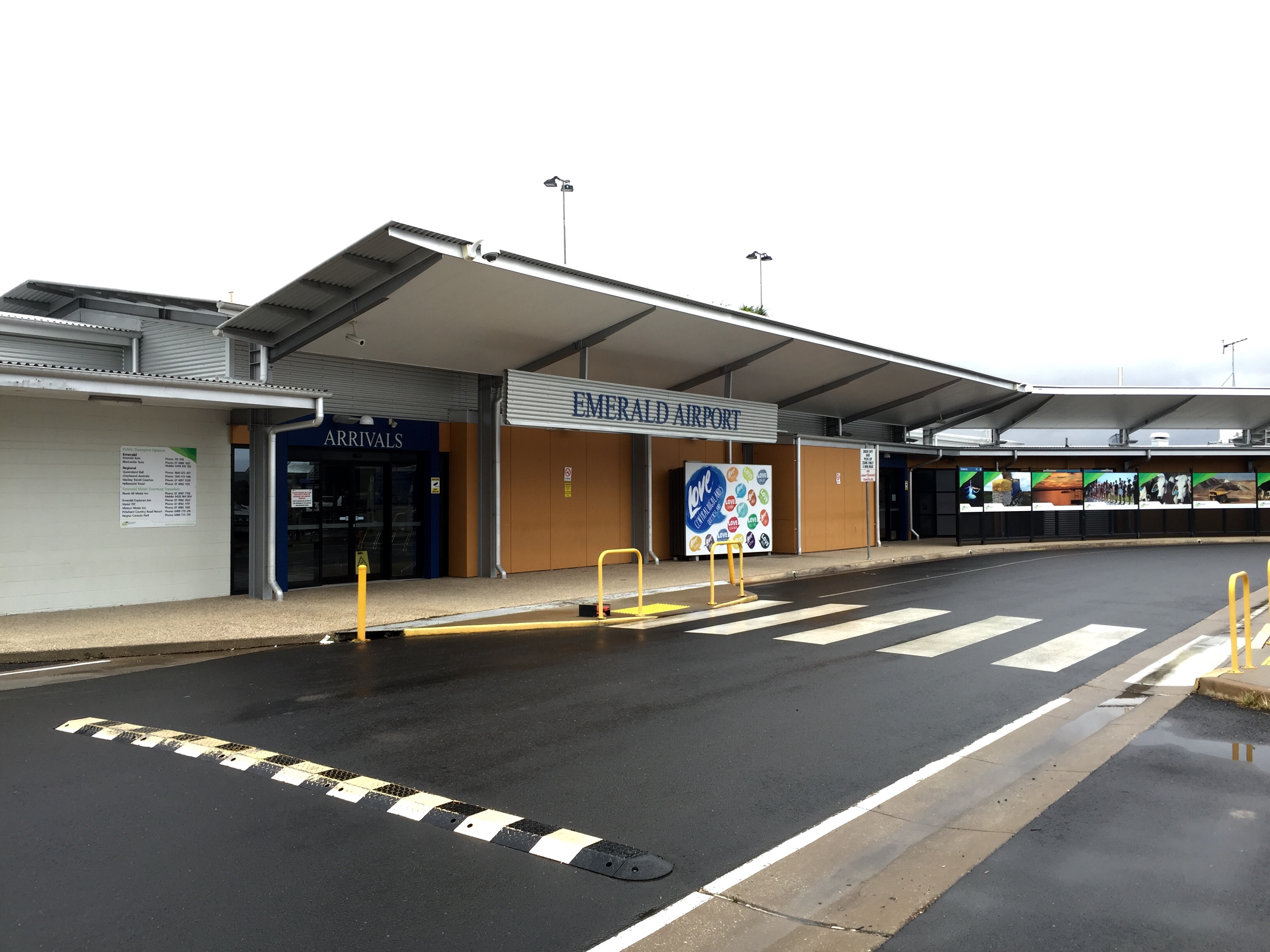

Emerald Airport (IATA: EMD, ICAO: YEML) is an airport serving Emerald, a town located in the Central Highlands district of Queensland, Australia. It is located 6 km (4 mi) south of the Emerald town centre, on the Gregory Highway (Springsure Road). The airport is operated by the Central Highlands Regional Council.

Emerald Airport is currently serviced by QantasLink and Virgin Australia Regional Airlines who operate a combined (on average) 54 return commercial services to Brisbane per week.

== Facilities ==
The airport is at an elevation of 624 ft (190 m) above sea level. It has two runways: 06/24 with an asphalt surface measuring 1,900 m × 30 m (6,234 ft × 98 ft) and 15/33 with an asphalt surface measuring 926 m × 18 m (3,038 ft × 59 ft).

Emerald Airport recently spent $7.7 million extending the terminal and refurbishing the old terminal. This was complete in the last quarter of 2010. This refurbishment, included security upgrades, improved amenities for passengers and a new flight status information system with displays throughout the airport and online.

In November 2014, work was completed on a $7.58 million upgrade to the Aircraft parking bays at the airport.

At the Australian Airport Association's 2021 National Airport Industry Awards, the airport was named Large Regional Airport of the Year.

== Airlines and destinations ==
Airlines	Destinations
Alliance Airlines	Brisbane, Sunshine Coast
QantasLink	Brisbane
Virgin Australia	Brisbane

== Statistics ==
Emerald Airport was ranked 29th in Australia for the number of revenue passengers served in calendar year 2014.

Annual passenger and aircraft statistics for Emerald
Year	Revenue passengers	Aircraft movements	National rank (passengers)
2005	69,928	2,375	46
2006	88,945	2,295	45
2007	98,677	2,278	42
2008	117,967	2,541	39
2009	119,008	2,450	39
2010	141,621	2,810	39
2011	193,341	3,474	36
2012	280,417	5,869	28
2013	283,233	6,585	26
2014	246,074	5,700	29

== See also ==
- List of airports in Queensland
