= QantasLink =

Regional airline of Australia

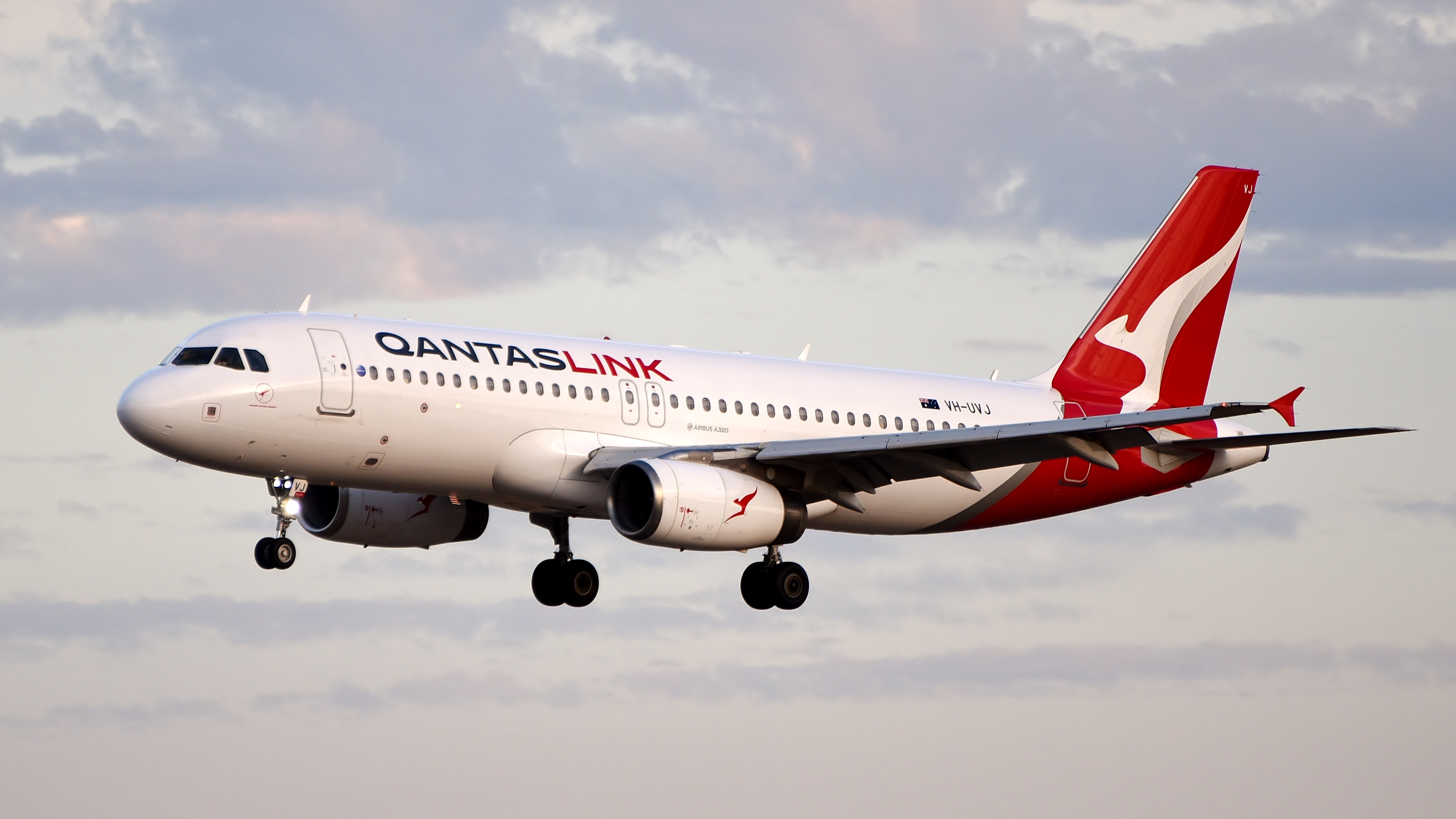
- QantasLink Airbus A320 operated by Network Aviation
IATA	ICAO	Call sign
QF	QLK (Note: On flights operated by Sunstate Airlines, Alliance Airlines and National Jet Systems); NWK (Note: On flights operated by Network Aviation)	Q LINK; NETLINK
- Founded: May 2001; 25 years ago
- Operating bases: Adelaide; Brisbane; Cairns; Canberra; Darwin; Hobart; Melbourne; Perth; Sydney
- Frequent-flyer program: Qantas Frequent Flyer
- Alliance: Oneworld (affiliate)
- Fleet size: 96
- Destinations: 68 (4 international)
- Parent company: Qantas
- Headquarters: Mascot, New South Wales, Australia
- Key people: Mark Dal Pra (CEO QantasLink)
- Website: www.qantaslink.com.au

QantasLink is a full-service, regional brand of Australian flag carrier airline Qantas. It serves regional and remote destinations in every Australian state and territory and in the Indian Ocean territories, as well as short-haul international routes to East Timor, New Caledonia, New Zealand and the Solomon Islands. Flights are operated by three Qantas-owned subsidiaries, National Jet Systems, Network Aviation and Sunstate Airlines, with Embraer E190s wet-leased from Alliance Airlines. QantasLink is an affiliate member of the Oneworld airline alliance.

The brand was introduced in May 2001 to bring together the regional airlines that Qantas had acquired through its 1992 takeover of Australian Airlines: Eastern Australia Airlines, Southern Australia Airlines, Sunstate Airlines and the jet operation Airlink, whose aircraft and crews were supplied by National Jet Systems. QantasLink expanded after the collapse of Ansett Australia later that year and took over the jets of Impulse Airlines, which Qantas bought in November 2001. Qantas acquired Network Aviation, a Perth charter airline serving the mining industry, in 2010 and bought National Jet Systems in 2020. QantasLink retired its Boeing 717s in 2024 in favour of Airbus A220s, and by 2025 had reduced its turboprop fleet to a single type, the Dash 8-400.

== History ==
=== Origins ===
QantasLink's constituent airlines were assembled in the late 1980s and early 1990s by the government-owned domestic carrier Australian Airlines (formerly Trans Australia Airlines), which was competing with Ansett for regional feeder traffic ahead of the deregulation of domestic aviation. In 1988 it bought a 36 per cent stake in Eastern Australia Airlines, later increased to 42 per cent; it formed Australian Regional Airlines from the remnants of Air Queensland; and it made commercial agreements with other regional operators, including Sunstate Airlines, which it bought in 1990. A jet operation, Australian Airlink, was set up in 1990 in the aftermath of the 1989 Australian pilots' dispute. From 1991 its British Aerospace 146 aircraft, pilots, flight attendants and maintenance were supplied under contract by the Adelaide-based National Jet Systems (NJS), whose lower salaries and overheads made the arrangement cheaper than operating the routes directly.

Qantas bought Australian Airlines for A$400 million in September 1992. In April 1993 the Qantas board decided to retire the Australian Airlines name, and the fleets of the regional subsidiaries – Australian Airlink, Eastern Australia, Southern Australia, Sunstate and Australian Regional – were to adopt a modified version of the Qantas livery. Airlink, which flew as Qantas Airlink, expanded through the mid-1990s. In June 1994 Qantas announced that NJS would replace Airlink's four BAe 146-100s with three larger 146-200s and two 146-300s, increasing its capacity by 38 per cent, and in November that year Airlink began intrastate flights in Western Australia, challenging Ansett's long-standing dominance there. In October 1994 the federal opposition told Parliament there were safety concerns about Airlink's maintenance. Qantas said its safety investigators had found no matters of substance in issues raised by Civil Aviation Authority officers, and that Airlink was subject to the same safety audits as its other services, although it confirmed that bird-strike damage to one aircraft at Alice Springs had been repaired by an unqualified person. Airlink's pilots, who were employed by NJS, were not covered by the award that applied to Qantas and Ansett pilots and were paid less than Ansett's BAe 146 pilots. By 1996 Qantas operated intrastate services only through wholly owned subsidiaries, including Airlink, Eastern Australia, Southern Australia and Sunstate, and by 2000 Airlink was flying twice daily between Darwin and Dili in East Timor.

=== Formation (2001–2004) ===
Qantas' regional airlines began flying under the single QantasLink brand in May 2001. That month the ACCC approved an arrangement under which the low-cost carrier Impulse Airlines, which was heading for insolvency, stopped competing on trunk routes and flew for Qantas under a wet-lease contract. Qantas' chief executive, Geoff Dixon, said that Eastern Australia, Southern Australia, Sunstate and the NJS-operated Airlink would be brought together under the QantasLink banner, each remaining a separate profit centre. Qantas acquired Impulse on 21 November 2001, and its eight Boeing 717s and thirteen smaller aircraft were folded into QantasLink, the 717s being redeployed in QantasLink colours.

The collapse of Ansett and its regional subsidiaries in September 2001, weeks after the failure of the Queensland carrier Flightwest, left many regional centres without air services. QantasLink and other regional airlines operated hundreds of additional flights, and according to Qantas, QantasLink carried more than 4,000 stranded passengers free or at heavily discounted fares and added nine ports previously served by Flightwest and Ansett to its permanent network. In January 2002 it added five Dash 8-300s and, three months later, six more leased 717s, which it used to open non-stop routes such as Sydney–Rockhampton, Sydney–Mackay and Adelaide–Gold Coast; Qantas said the jet expansion would create 150 jobs, including 80 pilots and flight attendants based in Hobart. By mid-2002 QantasLink operated more than 2,700 flights a week to 55 destinations and employed about 1,600 people.

A 2002 cost review proposed merging QantasLink's five divisions – Eastern, Southern, Airlink, Sunstate and AirConnex – into separate jet and turboprop operations and reducing their five air operator's certificates to two, with job losses expected mainly in administration. Over the following year the managements of the Impulse and Airlink jet operations were combined, Southern Australia Airlines was absorbed into Eastern Australia Airlines and Airlink, and the Beechcraft 1900 and Shorts 360 fleets were withdrawn, leaving the Dash 8 as QantasLink's only turboprop. QantasLink also won a five-year Queensland Government contract to operate regulated routes to Weipa, Horn Island, Longreach, Barcaldine, Blackall, Roma and Charleville. In May 2004 the 14 Boeing 717s then flying under the QantasLink brand were transferred to Qantas' new low-cost airline, Jetstar, leaving QantasLink with Dash 8s and BAe 146s.

=== Expansion and fleet renewal (2004–2012) ===
In January 2005 QantasLink ordered seven Bombardier Q400s for $200 million; when the first arrived in January 2006, Qantas said QantasLink had become the first airline in the Southern Hemisphere to operate the type. From July 2005 its BAe 146s were progressively replaced by 717s released by Jetstar, which National Jet Systems operated and maintained for QantasLink under an agreement signed in June 2005. A network review in mid-2006, prompted by rising fuel prices and falling patronage, ended QantasLink services to Kangaroo Island and Port Lincoln in June and to Burnie in July, leaving those routes to Regional Express (Rex), which said it would add flights if demand justified it; at the same time twice-daily QantasLink Dash 8 flights replaced Qantas' daily Boeing 737 service between Melbourne and Launceston. Qantas then described QantasLink as Australia's largest regional carrier, operating more than 1,800 flights a week to 48 destinations.

In October 2007 Qantas announced an order for twelve more Q400s for QantasLink, with options on a further 24, which would allow it to retire its 36-seat Dash 8-100s; in July 2010, with 21 already bought, it ordered seven more. A nationwide shortage of pilots, whom larger airlines were recruiting from regional carriers, forced QantasLink to suspend some New South Wales and Queensland services in early 2008, and in June that year, citing record fuel prices, it announced that it would leave the Melbourne–Wollongong route, permanently end its suspended Newcastle services, retire its six remaining Dash 8-100s early and close its Mildura maintenance base, with the loss of 20 jobs.

In December 2010 Qantas bought Network Aviation, a Perth-based charter airline that flew fly-in fly-out workers to Western Australian mine sites, for about $30 million. Network, then the state's third-largest fly-in fly-out airline, operated two Fokker 100s and six 30-seat Embraer turboprops and kept its own management.

=== 2013–2019 ===
In November 2013 QantasLink began flying Boeing 717s fitted with a business-class cabin on some of Qantas' Canberra routes, and from mid-April 2014 its 717s replaced Qantas' Boeing 737s on flights between Hobart and the mainland. The change was accompanied by the redundancy of Qantas' 35 ground-handling staff in Hobart, which the federal MP Andrew Wilkie described as "another alarming downgrade of Tasmania". Qantas said the changes were about having "the right aircraft on the right routes", added a daily return flight between Hobart and Melbourne and said QantasLink would recruit 15 pilots and 30 flight attendants to be based in Hobart. The redeployment made QantasLink the Qantas Group's fastest-growing division by capacity in July 2014. From December 2015 QantasLink 717s also flew between Sydney and the Sunshine Coast.

On 31 July 2015 Qantas announced that all of Network Aviation's services would be operated under the QantasLink brand and that its 14 Fokker 100s would be repainted in QantasLink colours, unveiling the first repainted aircraft; Network kept its own air operator's certificate.

=== 2020–present ===
On 20 May 2020, Qantas announced the purchase of Cobham Australia's National Jet Systems subsidiary, which had operated the Boeing 717-200 on behalf of QantasLink for 15 years, bringing both employees and the fleet in-house. In August 2020 QantasLink announced that it would close its Boeing 717 bases in Perth and Cairns, moving eight of the aircraft from Perth to Brisbane and basing six in Melbourne.

On 4 February 2021, Qantas announced an initial three-year deal with Alliance Airlines to wet-lease three Embraer E190 aircraft, with the option of up to 14, to operate on routes such as Adelaide–Alice Springs, Darwin–Alice Springs and Darwin–Adelaide. Qantas progressively expanded the arrangement, and by February 2025 it had called up all 30 aircraft available under the agreement. In August 2026 the agreement was renegotiated – a move signalled in late 2025 because of unexpectedly high costs – to reduce the wet-leased fleet from 30 to 23 aircraft over the 2026–27 financial year, with higher prices paid by Qantas.

John Gissing, QantasLink's chief executive, retired in November 2023 and was succeeded by Rachel Yangoyan. In December 2025 Qantas placed QantasLink under the chief executive of its domestic airline, Markus Svensson, while keeping the airlines' separate air operator's certificates. Yangoyan became the group's chief technology, AI and transformation officer and was replaced at QantasLink by Jetstar's Mark Dal Pra, who reports to Svensson and does not sit on the group's leadership team.

In October 2025 QantasLink announced that it would close its pilot and cabin crew bases in Canberra, Hobart and Mildura in April 2026. About 70 staff were affected; they were offered support to commute from those cities or to relocate to Sydney, Melbourne or Brisbane. The airline said that concentrating crews at its larger bases would help it respond to disruptions and reduce delays and cancellations, and that flights to the three cities would not be affected. The federal transport minister, Catherine King, called the decision disappointing, and it was criticised by unions and by local, state and federal politicians, although the chief executive of Mildura Airport said Qantas had "maintained open and transparent communication" with the airport. In February 2026 the Senate Rural and Regional Affairs and Transport References Committee found that the decision had been "poorly communicated and managed", described Qantas executives' evidence about when it had been made as "evasive and inconsistent", said it was unconvinced that the change would reduce cancellations and delays on regional flights, and warned that consolidating QantasLink's operations in the major cities risked "making QantasLink a regional airline in name only".

In November 2025 QantasLink began twice-weekly flights from Perth to Christmas Island and the Cocos (Keeling) Islands under a five-year passenger and freight agreement with the federal government, taking over the service from Virgin Australia. In 2026 island residents criticised its decision to cut the included baggage allowance from 30 to 23 kilograms and to raise the price of excess baggage, and the local federal MP asked it to reverse the changes; Qantas said they would help manage aircraft weight, reduce baggage offloads and make more seats available. In April 2026, citing higher fuel costs and falling demand, Qantas cut its Adelaide–Mount Gambier flights indefinitely and suspended four other routes.

== Competition and market position ==
Qantas has described QantasLink as a full-service regional airline that feeds regional business and leisure travellers into its domestic network. According to the ACCC, around 60 per cent of regional routes and 70 per cent of remote routes in Australia were served by a single airline group in early 2026, and Qantas, predominantly through QantasLink, carried a much larger share of passengers on remote routes than any other airline: 63.7 per cent in January 2026. Qantas has said that it is the largest provider of regional air services in Australia but is the sole airline on only 38 of the more than 100 domestic routes it serves, and that the concentration of the domestic market is "a product of Australia's geography and population profile" rather than of barriers to entry.

Qantas' entry to or expansion on routes served by smaller airlines has repeatedly led to accusations of predatory conduct, which Qantas has rejected. In December 2009 Rex complained to the ACCC that QantasLink had responded to its entry on the Mackay–Townsville route by cutting its lowest one-way fare to $99 and adding about 40,000 seats a year. Rex withdrew from the route three months after launching it; QantasLink said its decisions were made "purely on a commercial basis" and rejected the suggestion that it had engaged in predatory pricing.

In early 2020 Rex complained to the ACCC that Qantas was "dumping excess capacity" on three routes, including Adelaide–Kangaroo Island, and announced that it would stop flying to Kangaroo Island and Ballina; Qantas denied the claims and, after Rex's announcement, added seven weekly return flights to the island. In February 2021 Rex, which was about to enter the capital-city market, announced that it would drop five routes by the end of March, blaming what it described as intimidation by Qantas, which had added 26 regional routes since the start of the COVID-19 pandemic. Rex said it needed to defend eight other routes that Qantas had expanded into and that had previously supported only one regional airline, and that it could no longer justify marginal services once government support for them ended. Qantas flew only one of the five routes Rex was dropping, and QantasLink's chief executive, John Gissing, called the decision "a classic Rex tantrum". The ACCC chair, Rod Sims, told a Senate inquiry in March 2021 that it was "a bit hard to call that predatory" when Qantas was making a cash contribution by flying the routes, although he said the assessment might differ once conditions returned to normal. In March 2022 the ACCC completed an investigation, prompted by Rex's complaints, into whether Qantas' entry onto low-traffic regional routes historically served by Rex, and its addition of capacity on intercity routes after Rex began flying them, was a misuse of market power. It took no action, noting that COVID-19 restrictions had affected competition at the time, and said it would "continue to pay close attention to any behaviour that may be anti-competitive". In June 2022 Rex, which had dropped Melbourne–Albury, said it had been forced off the route by Qantas' "predatory entry"; Gissing said that what Rex called predatory behaviour was "actually competition which provides these regional communities with choice, more services and lower fares". QantasLink's arrival at Mount Gambier in March 2021 ended Rex's 14 years as the city's only airline; in April 2026 Qantas suspended the route indefinitely, citing fuel costs and falling demand.

Qantas' relationship with Alliance Airlines has also drawn regulatory attention. In February 2019 Qantas bought a 19.9 per cent stake in Alliance, a long-standing QantasLink contractor, for $60 million, with a view to eventually taking majority control. The ACCC investigated the shareholding, describing Alliance as "a close, important and growing competitor to Qantas"; Qantas, which said it had remained a passive investor and saw no evidence that its stake had lessened competition, paused its takeover plans and agreed not to buy more shares. The ACCC said it would consider the 2021 E190 wet-lease agreement as part of the investigation, which it closed in April 2022 without taking enforcement action. In May 2022 Qantas agreed to buy the rest of Alliance for $614 million, but in April 2023 the ACCC opposed the acquisition, finding that the two companies were each other's closest competitors in supplying charter flights with mid-sized jets to resources industry customers, with a combined market share of more than 60 per cent in Western Australia and 70 to 80 per cent in Queensland. The takeover was abandoned in October 2023, the companies saying that pursuing it would require expensive legal action; Qantas kept its stake.

== Airfares ==
The cost of regional flights, particularly on routes with a single airline, has been examined by several parliamentary inquiries. At a 2017 Western Australian parliamentary inquiry, Qantas executives declined to provide a breakdown of the airline's regional fare modelling, citing commercial confidentiality, and attributed high fares to operating costs, airport charges and the one-directional nature of fly-in fly-out demand, although Australian Airports Association data showed that most regional airports operated at a loss. Qantas later gave the committee confidential information showing that average one-way fares to Kalgoorlie, Karratha and Broome had been lower in 2016–17 than in 2011–12. The committee found that most of the state's unregulated regional routes were flown by both Qantas and Virgin Australia, a "duopolistic market structure" that "may prevent the effective operation of market forces"; noted that Qantas' regional flights in the state were operated by QantasLink (Network Aviation) or by code-share partners; found that the aircraft used by all airlines on the state's regional routes were significantly older than those on routes elsewhere in Australia; and described Qantas' new residents' discount fare as "a welcome step" while questioning whether it offered a long-term solution.

A Senate committee inquiry into regional air services heard complaints of very high fares in remote towns, but concluded in 2019 that it "could not form the view that there was 'price gouging' or other market manipulation taking place by airlines operating in regional areas". Submitters told it that resident discounts had "negligible impact" on high fares, a criticism made particularly of the Qantas scheme, which did not apply to sale fares. In August 2019 Qantas announced that it would cap return fares booked at peak times or at short notice at about $800 for residents of 16 remote towns in Queensland, the Northern Territory and Western Australia, starting with seven towns whose airports and councils had agreed to lower their passenger charges; Qantas valued the discounts at up to $10 million a year.

In October 2025 the federal government asked the Productivity Commission to inquire into regional airfares, after its 2024 aviation white paper found that fares on flights involving regional airports were on average 52 per cent higher per kilometre than those between capital cities. In its submission the ACCC said that the lack of competitive pressure on regional and remote routes had "likely contributed to persistently high airfares and limited available services for many communities". Qantas told the inquiry that fewer than 2 per cent of non-corporate passengers on its regional turboprop network had bought full economy fares in the previous twelve months, that the average economy base fare on that network, excluding airport and government charges, was under $200, and that more than 200,000 discounted resident fare trips were booked each year.

== Reliability and customer satisfaction ==
In August 2023 QantasLink cancelled 14.8 per cent of its flights between Canberra and Sydney, against 3.8 per cent for Virgin Australia, and Canberra Airport called on Qantas to give affected passengers a free flight. Qantas acknowledged that cancellations had been "unacceptably high" and moved more of the route's flights from Dash 8s to Boeing 737s. In June 2025 Qantas, including QantasLink, cancelled 14.7 per cent of its flights on the route; the airlines cited poor weather, the ACCC said that aircraft engineering issues were another significant factor, and Qantas was replacing the route's Q300s with Q400s. Across its regional network QantasLink cancelled 3 per cent of flights in December 2025, when Virgin Australia's regional arm cancelled none; Qantas said its regional operations were more susceptible to weather and that "many routes are not covered by other airlines". A government-commissioned survey of 4,000 Australians, published in 2026, found that satisfaction with Virgin Australia, Qantas, Jetstar and QantasLink was almost 15 percentage points lower than satisfaction with international airlines on international flights; the industry body Airlines for Australia and New Zealand, to which Qantas referred questions, said disruption was "not a massive and wholesale problem".

== Labour relations ==
In 2007 more than 100 QantasLink pilots employed by National Jet Systems on individual Australian Workplace Agreements voted to take industrial action to win a collective agreement. At the time the federal Workplace Ombudsman was prosecuting the company over alleged duress on two pilots to sign the agreements and the alleged underpayment of 33 pilots; the company had denied applying duress.

In October 2010 licensed engineers at Sunstate Airlines, whose union was negotiating a new enterprise agreement, reported what they said were defects in the cockpit door locks of its Dash 8s; the union said the new locks could be opened "with anything from paddle pop sticks to boarding passes" and called for the aircraft to be grounded, and the federal Office of Transport Security investigated. Qantas said the doors met all regulatory requirements, that upgrades had begun before the claims were made public and that the union was engaged in an "irresponsible escalation of an industrial campaign". Sunstate stood down six engineers whose defect reports had grounded almost all of the Dash 8s due to fly from Brisbane on the morning of 20 October, and later gave them formal warnings. The union's claim in the Federal Court that this was unlawful adverse action was dismissed in November 2012: the judge found that the aviation regulations the union relied on did not give the engineers a "workplace right" under the Fair Work Act, and described the grounding as "one more chapter in a saga of industrial action" that had accompanied the bargaining.

In 2021 about 450 QantasLink pilots accepted agreements that included a two-year wage freeze, the first major unionised group at Qantas to do so during the COVID-19 pandemic; because the agreements were backdated to 2019, the freeze had already elapsed and the pilots would receive 2 per cent rises in 2021 and 2022. Network Aviation's pilots, whose previous agreement had expired in 2020, voted down proposed agreements in four ballots between October 2023 and March 2024 and held a series of strikes, some lasting several consecutive days. The first, a 24-hour stoppage on 4 October 2023, forced the airline to cancel half its planned flights, although it rebooked three-quarters of the 3,500 affected passengers on other flights the same day. In March 2024 the Fair Work Commission granted the company's application for an intractable bargaining declaration under provisions that had taken effect in June 2023, allowing the commission to arbitrate the terms of a new agreement.

== Fleet ==
=== Current fleet ===
QantasLink flights, except the Embraer E190s wet-leased from Alliance, are operated by the individual airlines that make up the group – National Jet Systems, Network Aviation and Sunstate Airlines. All flights use QF IATA codes. All airlines except Network Aviation operate under QantasLink's ICAO designator, QLK, while Network Aviation aircraft operate under their own, NWK. The callsigns for the two designators are "Q LINK" and "NETLINK" respectively.

As of July 2026, QantasLink operates the following aircraft:

QantasLink fleet
Aircraft	In Service	Orders	Passengers			Operator	Notes
Aircraft	In Service	Orders	J	Y	Total	Operator	Notes
Airbus A220-300	16	13	10	127	137	National Jet Systems	Deliveries began in December 2023.
Airbus A319-100	9	—	—	150	150	Network Aviation	Former Spirit Airlines aircraft.
Airbus A320-200	19	—	—	180	180	Network Aviation	Former Jetstar aircraft. Cabin and Wi-Fi retrofit due to be completed in early 2027
De Havilland Canada Dash 8-400	31	—	—	74	74	Sunstate Airlines	
De Havilland Canada Dash 8-400	12	—	—	78	78	Sunstate Airlines	Former WestJet aircraft.
Embraer 190	—	3	—	100	100	Network Aviation	Replacing Fokker 100; Up to 14 aircraft to be sourced for F100 replacement Mid-life aircraft deliveries began in September 2026; Aircraft to enter service in January 2027 following cabin and Wi-Fi retrofit
Fokker 100	11	—	—	100	100	Network Aviation	Former Tyrolean Airways, Germania and Avianca aircraft. To be retired and replaced by Embraer 190; Four of the older aircraft were to be replaced by four ex-Jetstar Asia Airbus A320s.
Total	98	16					

=== Fleet development ===
Current fleet of QantasLink

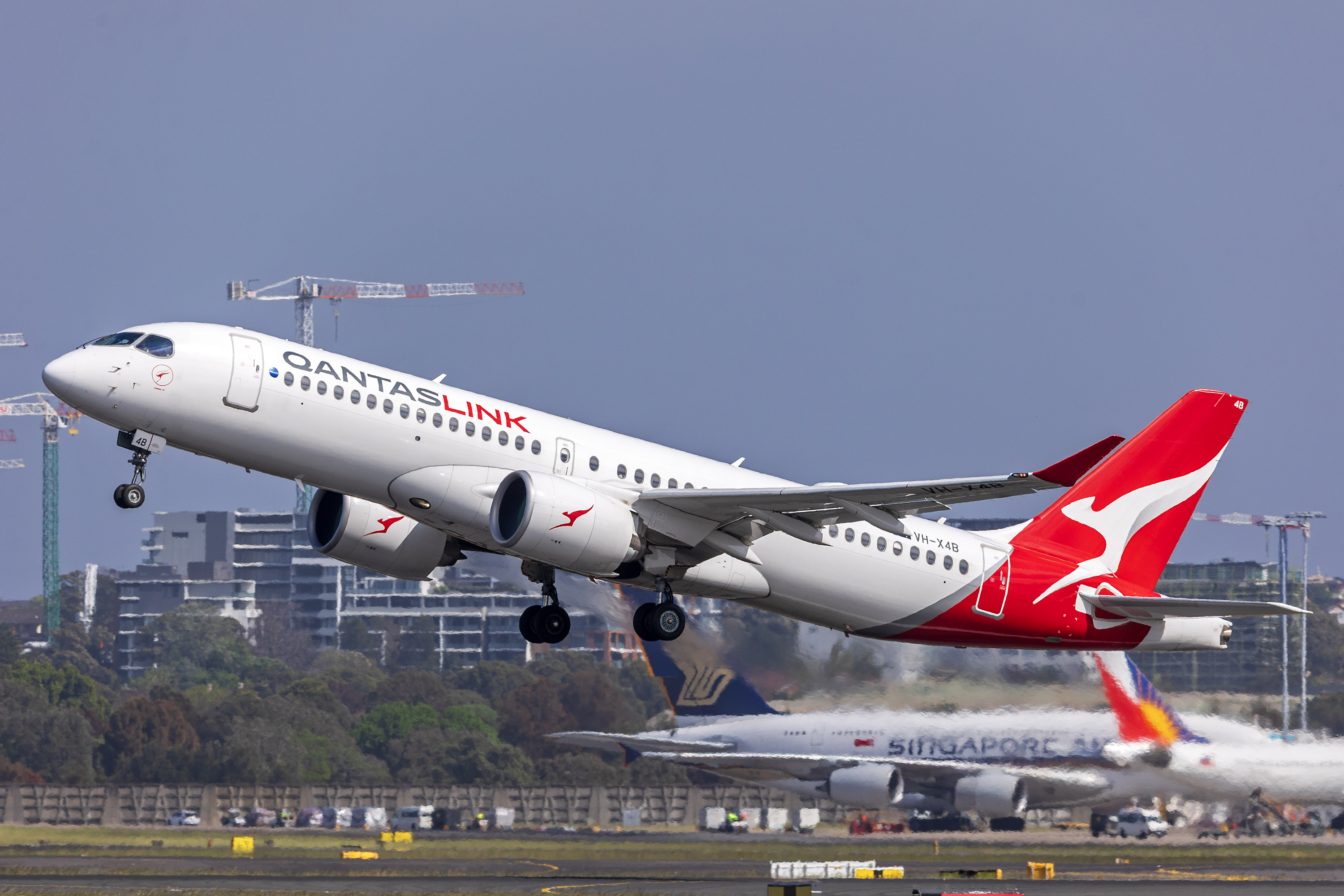
Airbus A220-300

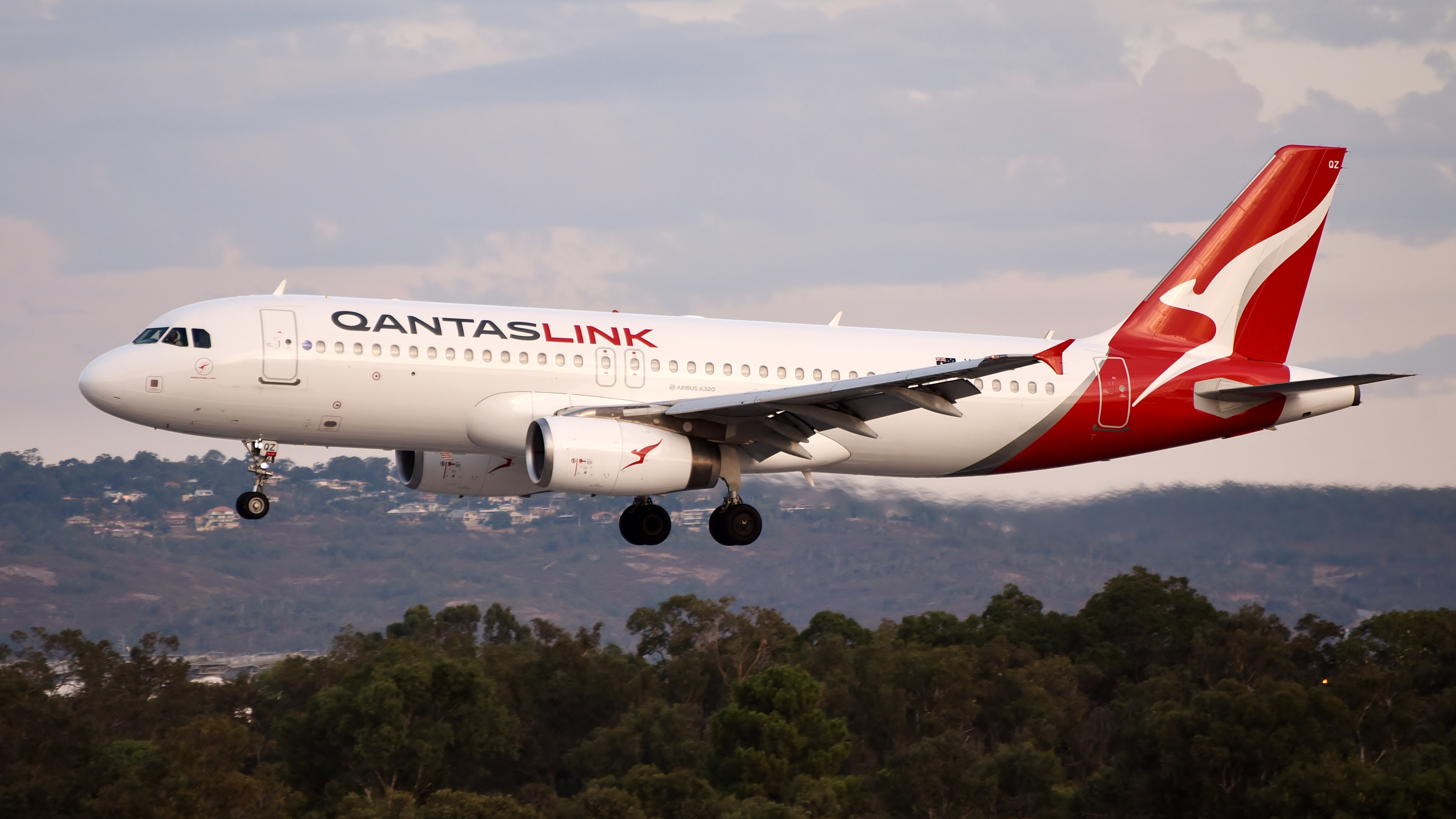
Airbus A320-200

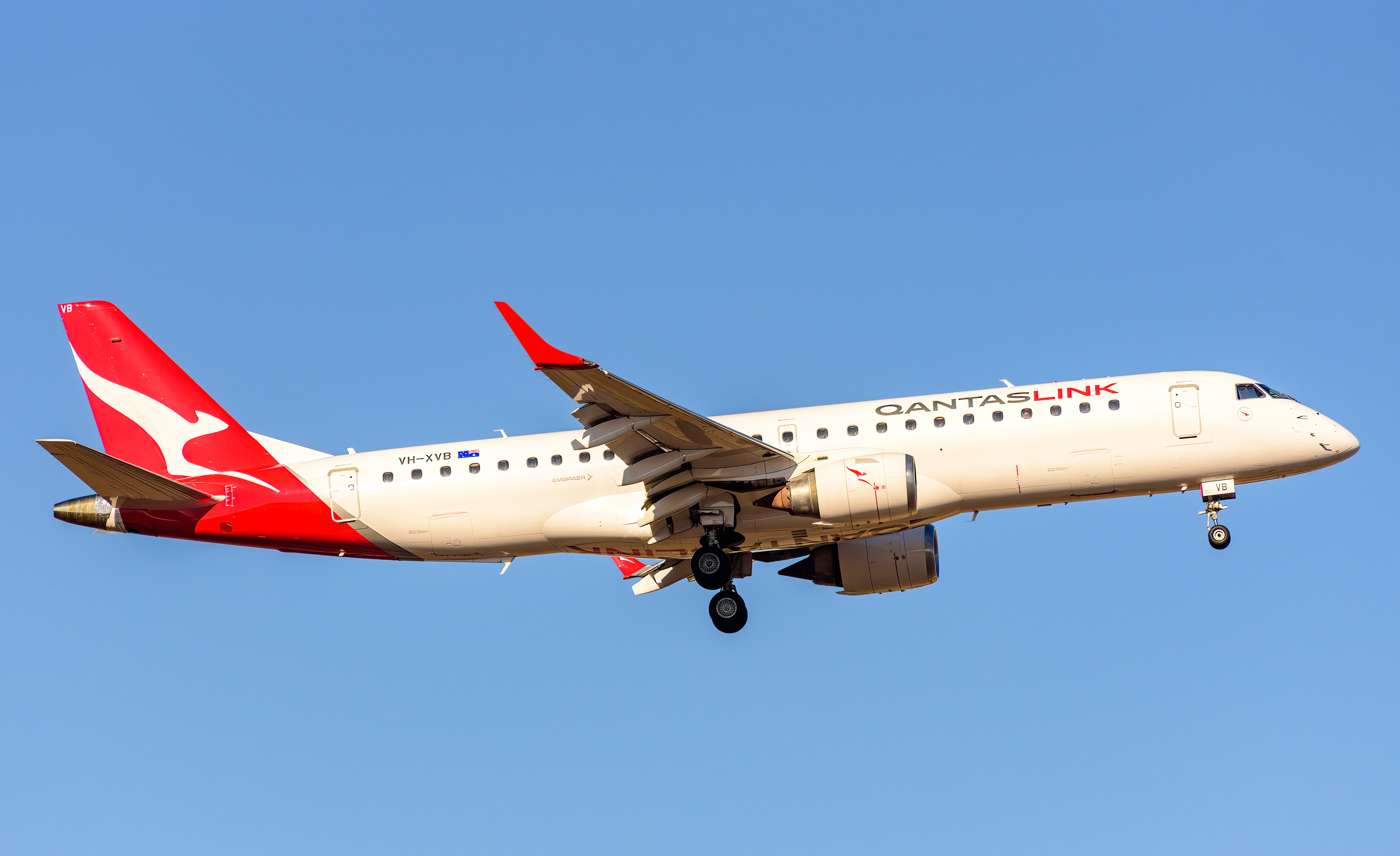
Embraer E-190

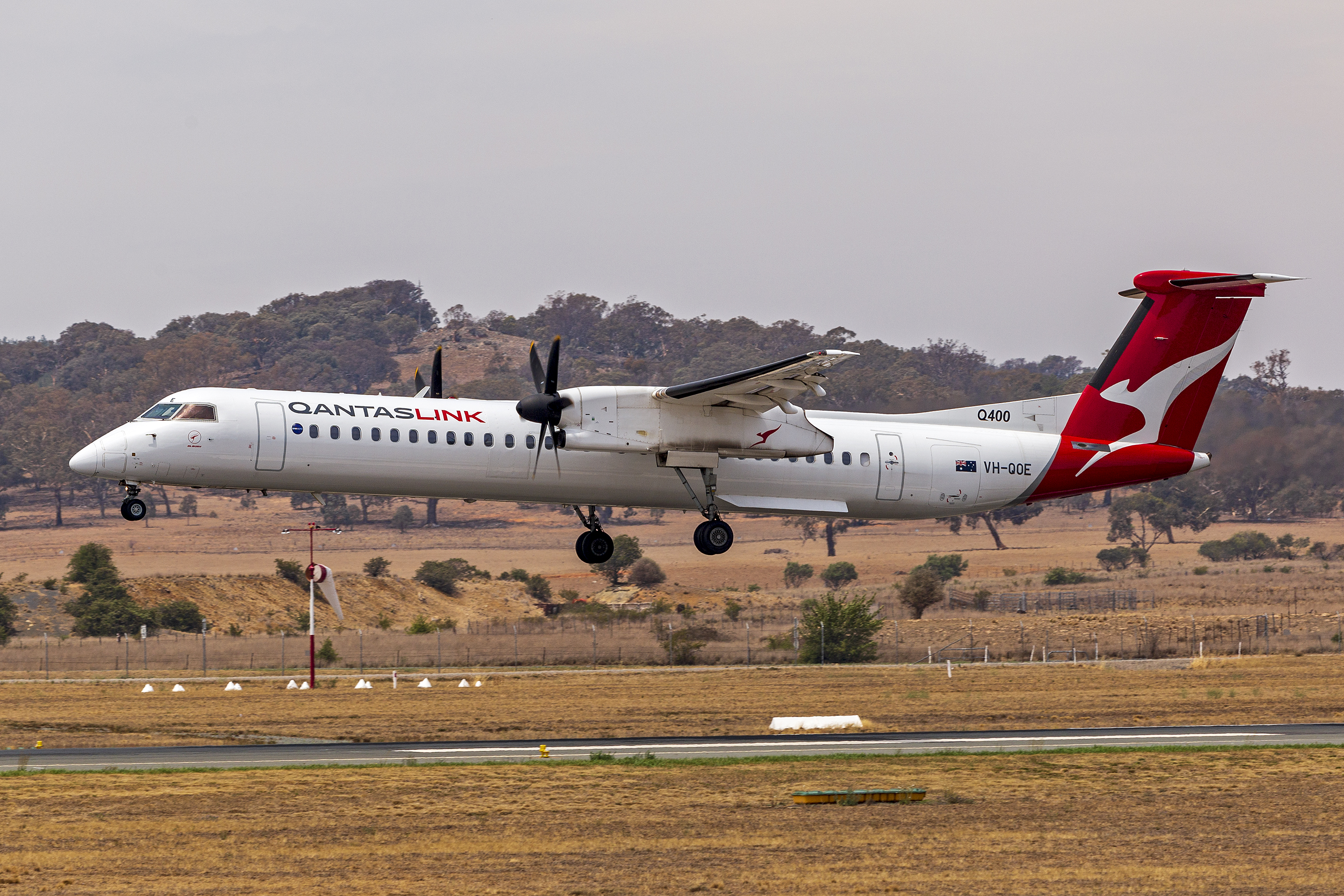
De Havilland Canada Dash 8-400

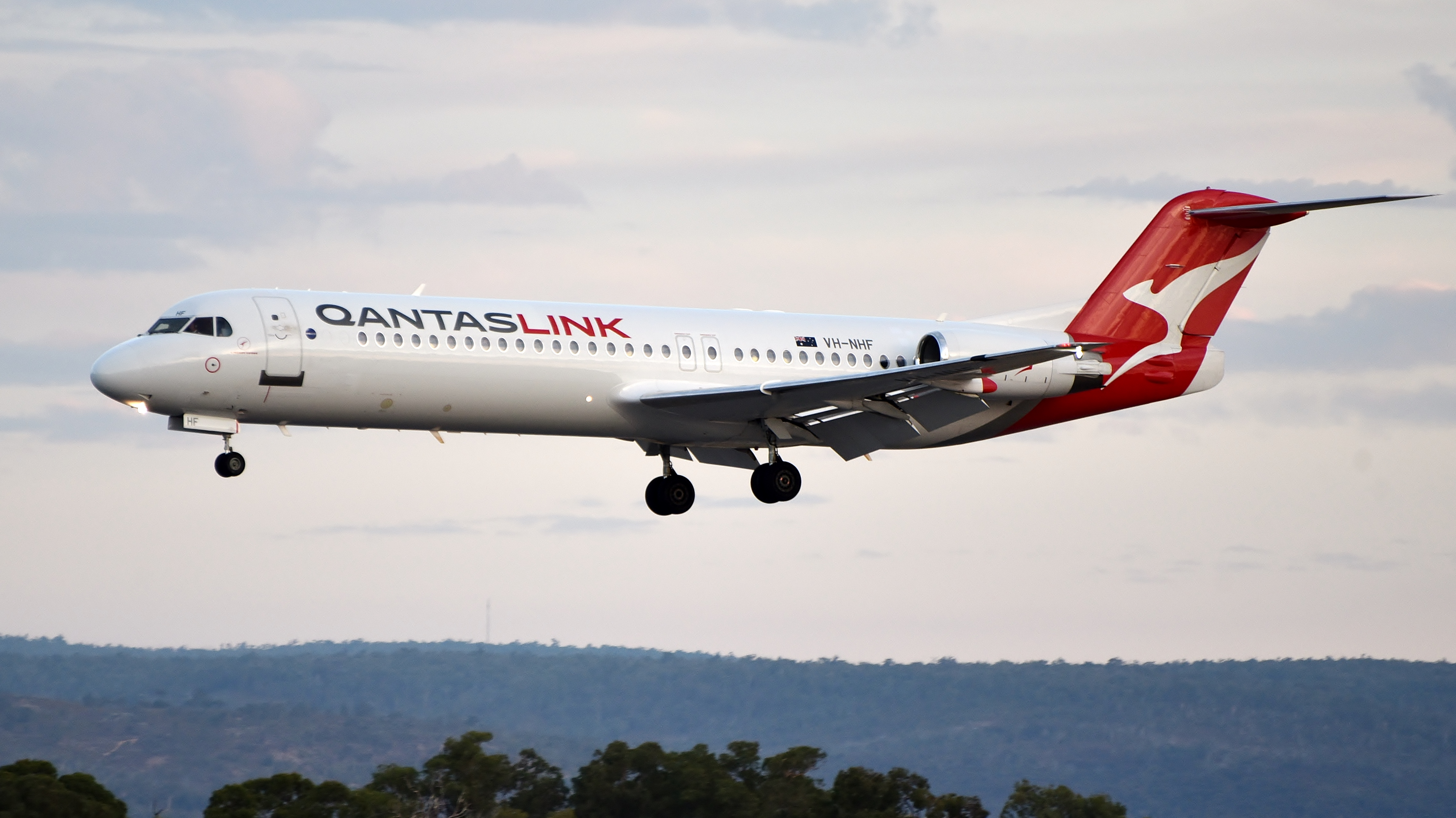
Fokker 100

From 2006 QantasLink increased capacity by adding Q400s, which were to replace its smaller Dash 8-100s. QantasLink continued to acquire the Q400 despite landing gear problems experienced by other airlines during this period. In September 2007 six of its seven Q400s were grounded for a day for inspections ordered after landing-gear failures on Scandinavian Airlines aircraft; when SAS withdrew its Q400s the following month, Qantas said it had no plans to do the same, having just ordered twelve more. In August 2010 five of its 21 Q400s were grounded after cracks were found in a main landing gear component; Qantas said the problem was not an immediate safety concern but had to be fixed before the aircraft returned to service.

From July 2005 QantasLink's Boeing 717s were operated under contract by National Jet Systems, initially on routes in Western Australia, the Northern Territory and Queensland; from late 2013 they also flew to Canberra and, from 2014, to Hobart.

In March 2007 QantasLink announced that it would expand its 717 fleet from eight to eleven aircraft under a renewed contract with National Jet Systems, which had by then provided crews for Qantas' regional jet operations for 15 years.

In May 2008 QantasLink announced that Tamworth would be the first of its New South Wales regional destinations to be served by the Q400, from August that year.

On 8 December 2009, QantasLink announced that it would re-enter the Adelaide to Port Lincoln market from February 2010, using Q400 aircraft flying 23 return services a week.

In March 2010, QantasLink and the Qantas Group announced that QantasLink would start its first international route, from Cairns to Port Moresby, using Q400 aircraft already based in Cairns. The service commenced in July 2010. A QantasLink spokesperson said that the airline would not turn into a fully fledged international airline, but could operate international routes in the future. QantasLink operated the route until 2016 and resumed it in March 2019.

In November 2014 QantasLink began Q400 flights between Sydney and the newly built Brisbane West Wellcamp Airport (now Toowoomba Wellcamp Airport). QantasLink had been the first airline to commit to serving the airport, and in February 2016 it added two weekday flights, taking the service to fifteen return flights a week; the airport said travellers wanted more options for same-day return trips.

On 18 December 2014, QantasLink announced that it would add Whyalla, South Australia, to its network, with double daily flights to commence on 13 April 2015. The route was initially served by 50-seat Q300s.

In July 2016, Alliance Airlines delivered the first of three additional Fokker 100s, with two more delivered by the end of the year.

In June 2017 QantasLink announced that it would resume flights to Kangaroo Island in December 2017, from Adelaide and, during the peak summer season, from Melbourne.

In January 2018 QantasLink announced that two Airbus A320s would be transferred from Jetstar and operated by Network Aviation for flights to and from Perth. Network Aviation has steadily increased its use of ex-Jetstar Airbus A320s, and by September 2026 had 19 based in Perth.

In December 2021, Qantas announced an initial order for 20 Airbus A220-300 aircraft with additional purchase options to replace its Boeing 717s. In June 2023 Qantas finalised an order for nine more A220-300s, bringing its firm order for the type to 29 aircraft.

In February 2023 Qantas announced that it would source five mid-life Airbus A319 or A320 aircraft for Network Aviation to meet continued growth in demand from resources clients in Western Australia. In February 2024 Qantas announced that it had bought four more mid-life A319s for Network Aviation, to be based in Western Australia to help meet demand from the resources sector, taking its A319 fleet to nine.

On 25 June 2024 Qantas announced that it would acquire 14 mid-life Dash 8-400s (Q400s) and gradually phase out QantasLink's 19 smaller Q200s and Q300s, increasing its Q400 fleet to 45 aircraft. The Qantas Group's chief executive, Vanessa Hudson, said that consolidating the turboprops into a single type would improve reliability and reduce complexity and cost, and that the aircraft would "provide certainty to the regions over the next decade while we work with aircraft manufacturers and other suppliers on electric or battery powered aircraft that are the right size and range for our network". The first of them, a former WestJet aircraft, arrived in Brisbane on 8 December 2024.

Qantas marked what it called the final day of Boeing 717 flying in Australia on 26 October 2024, when VH-YQS operated flights between Sydney, Launceston and Canberra, the last of them, QF1511, landing in Canberra; the 717s had flown for QantasLink and Jetstar for more than 20 years. However, another 717, VH-YQW, was brought back into service, reportedly to support Network Aviation. It flew between Perth and Paraburdoo from 6 to 26 November, on some Sydney–Hobart services in December and between Canberra and Melbourne from mid-December, before being flown to Brisbane on 30 December 2024. In January 2025 QantasLink said it would donate the aircraft to the new Qantas Group Engineering Academy in Brisbane so that apprentices could do part of their training on a jet.

On 28 October 2024, QantasLink and Skytrans announced that Skytrans, which had been awarded the New South Wales Government's licence for the Lord Howe Island route until March 2030, would take over the island's flights, acquiring QantasLink's three De Havilland Canada Dash 8-200s. The flights were to be codeshared with Qantas and operated from Qantas' Terminal 3 at Sydney Airport.

By late May 2025 the last Qantas-crewed flight had landed on Lord Howe Island, and Skytrans, which had acquired QantasLink's Q200s – the only aircraft in the Qantas fleet able to use the island's short runway – had begun taking over the route. Skytrans has operated all the flights since 1 December 2025, with the services still bookable through Qantas under a codeshare agreement.

On 25 June 2025, QantasLink announced that it had chosen the Embraer E190 as its preferred replacement for the Fokker 100s, with up to 14 mid-life aircraft to be sourced and the first expected towards the end of 2026. Four Airbus A320s from Jetstar Asia, which Qantas had announced it would close, were to allow four of the Fokker 100s to be retired early, and were due to begin entering service before the end of 2025.

On 8 August 2025 QantasLink operated its last Q300 flight, QF2003 from Tamworth to Sydney, leaving it with an all-Q400 turboprop fleet. To commemorate the retirement of the Q300, QantasLink operated QLK300, a celebratory flight for staff and crew, where the aircraft completed a scenic flight around Sydney and the Harbour Bridge. The Q400s are operated by Sunstate Airlines, and by late August 2025 the CASA aircraft register listed no aircraft for Eastern Australia Airlines. QantasLink spent about $230 million replacing its Q200s and Q300s with mid-life Q400s.

On 19 January 2026, QantasLink announced it had secured the first three Embraer E190 aircraft, with deliveries expected to begin by the end of 2026. The carrier reaffirmed its plans to source up to 14 aircraft for the gradual replacement of the Fokker 100 aircraft. The airline also announced cabin upgrades for the A320 aircraft and Wi-Fi installation across its A319 and A320 fleet.

=== Former fleet ===
QantasLink previously operated the following types:

QantasLink former fleet
Aircraft	Total	Introduced	Retired	Notes
BAe 146-100	7	2001	2005	
BAe 146-200	9	2001	2005	
BAe 146-300	2	2001	2006	
Beechcraft 1900	12	2001	2002	
Boeing 717-200	23	2001	2024	
De Havilland Canada Dash 8-100	16	2001	2008	Last aircraft disposed of in 2010
De Havilland Canada Dash 8-200	5	2001	2025	
De Havilland Canada Dash 8-300	19	2001	2025	
Short 360	4	2001	2002	

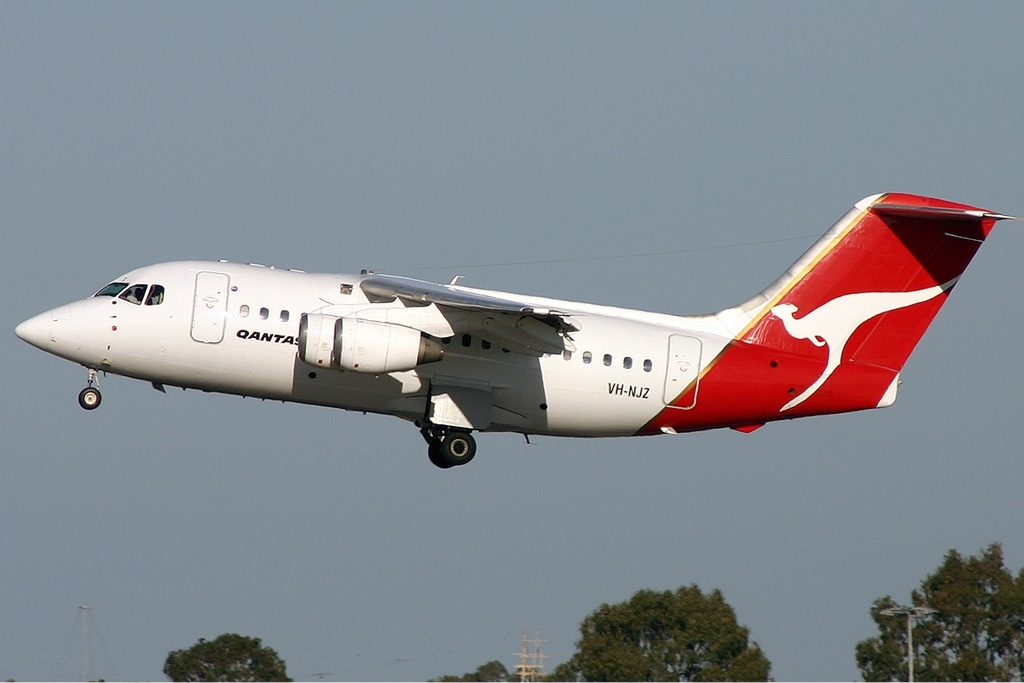
BAe 146–100 in 2003

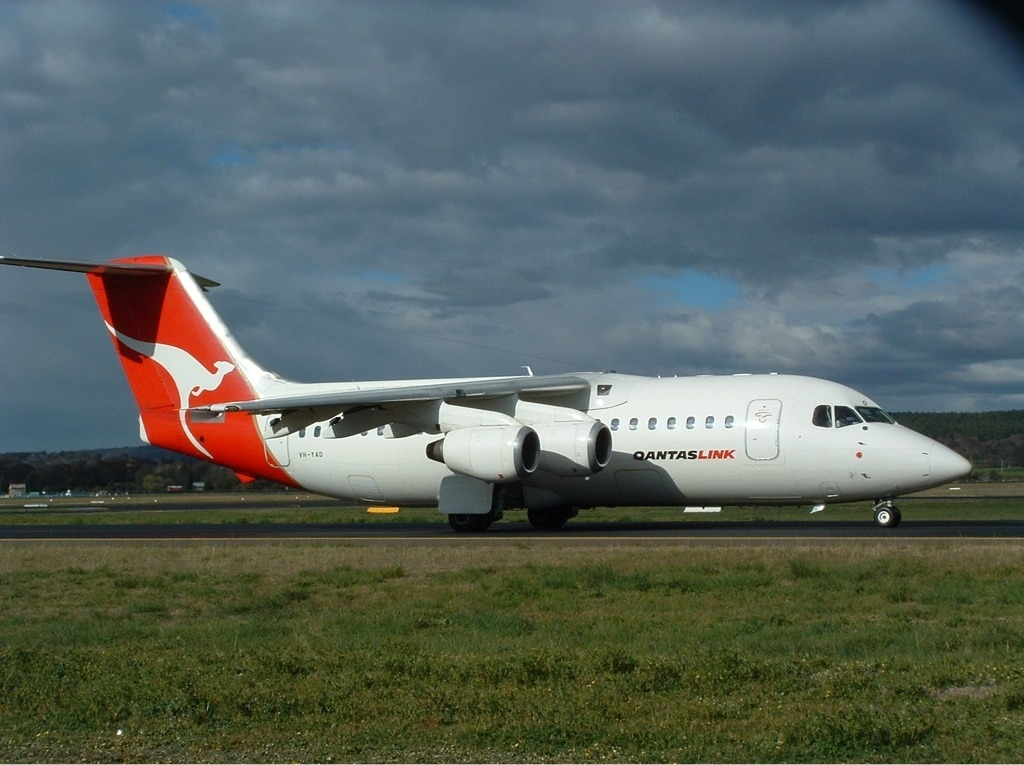
BAe 146–200 in 2003

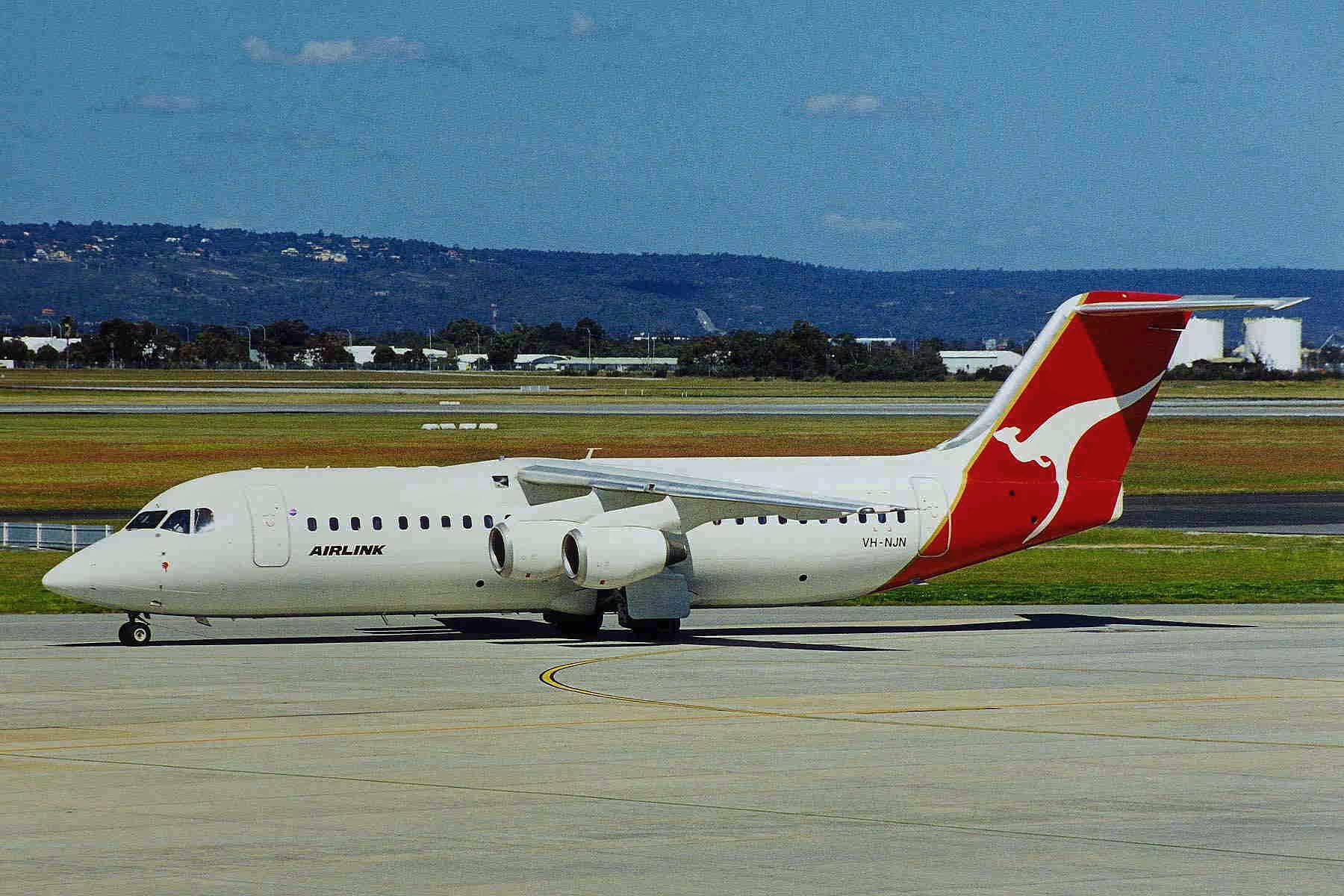
BAe 146–300 in 1999 (operating as Airlink)

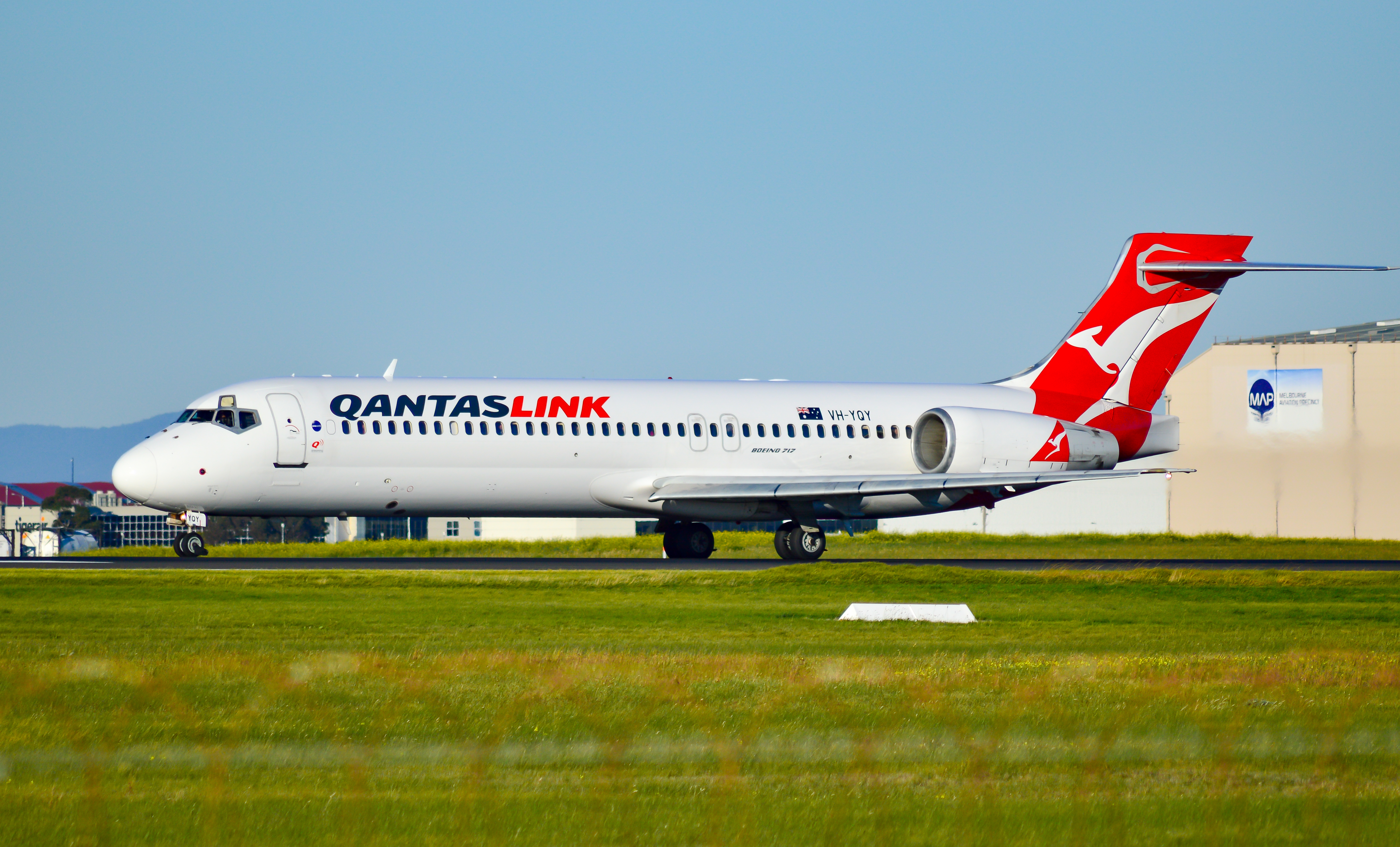
Boeing 717–200 in 2017

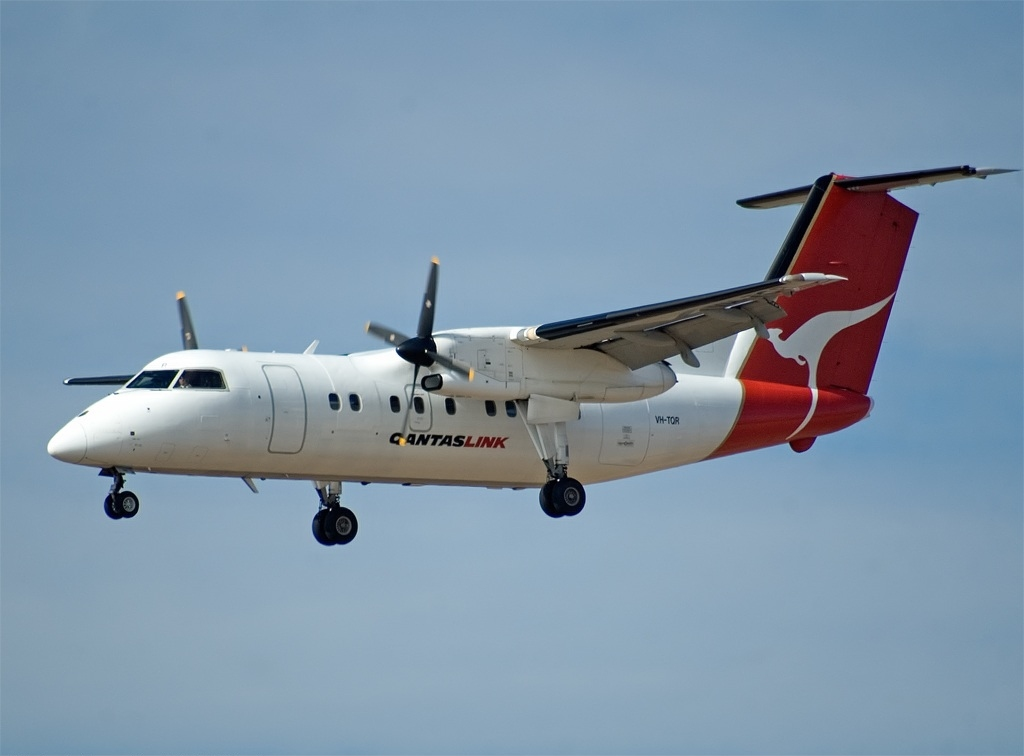
De Havilland Canada Dash 8-100 in 2004

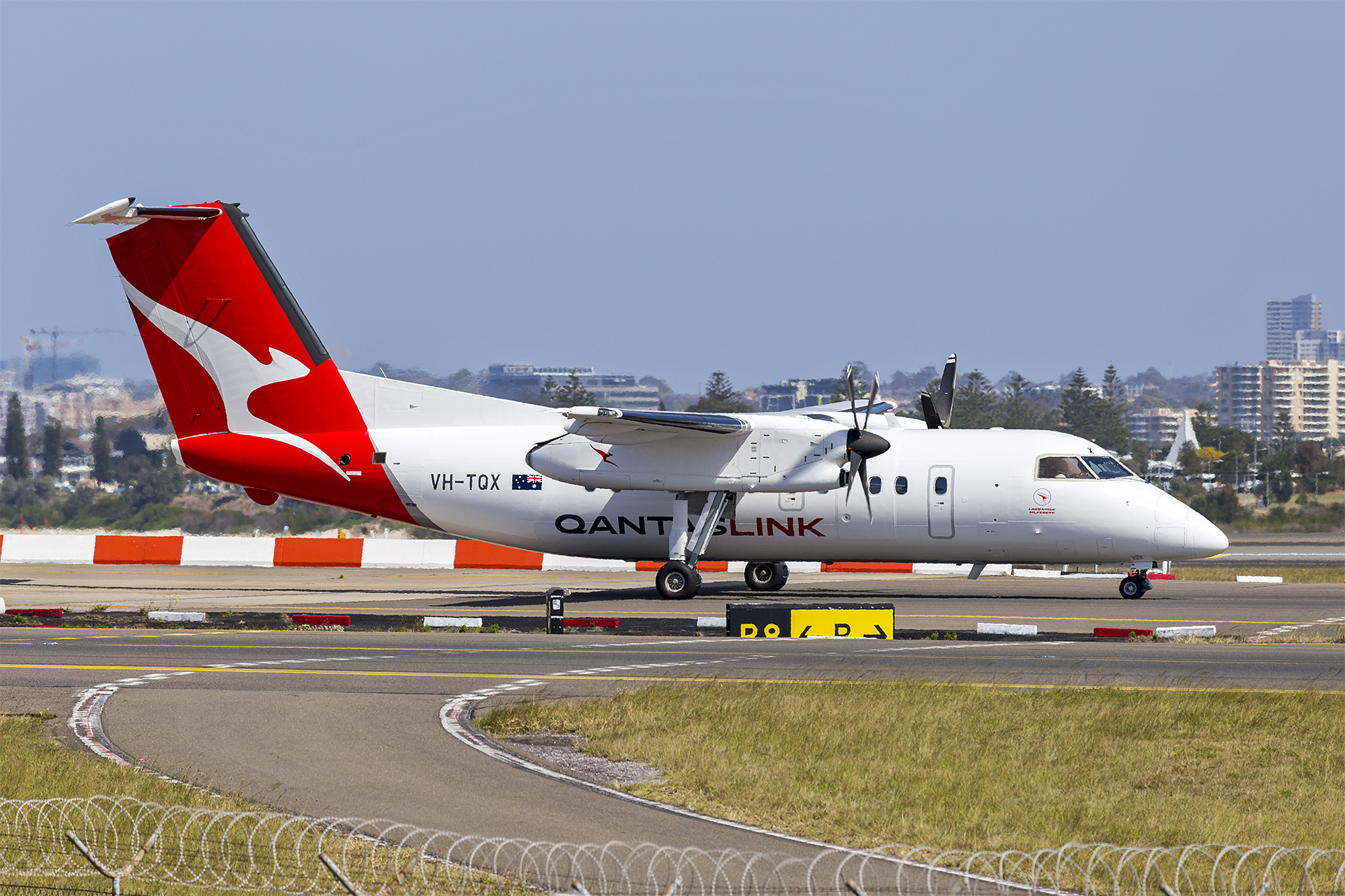
De Havilland Canada Dash 8-200 in 2018

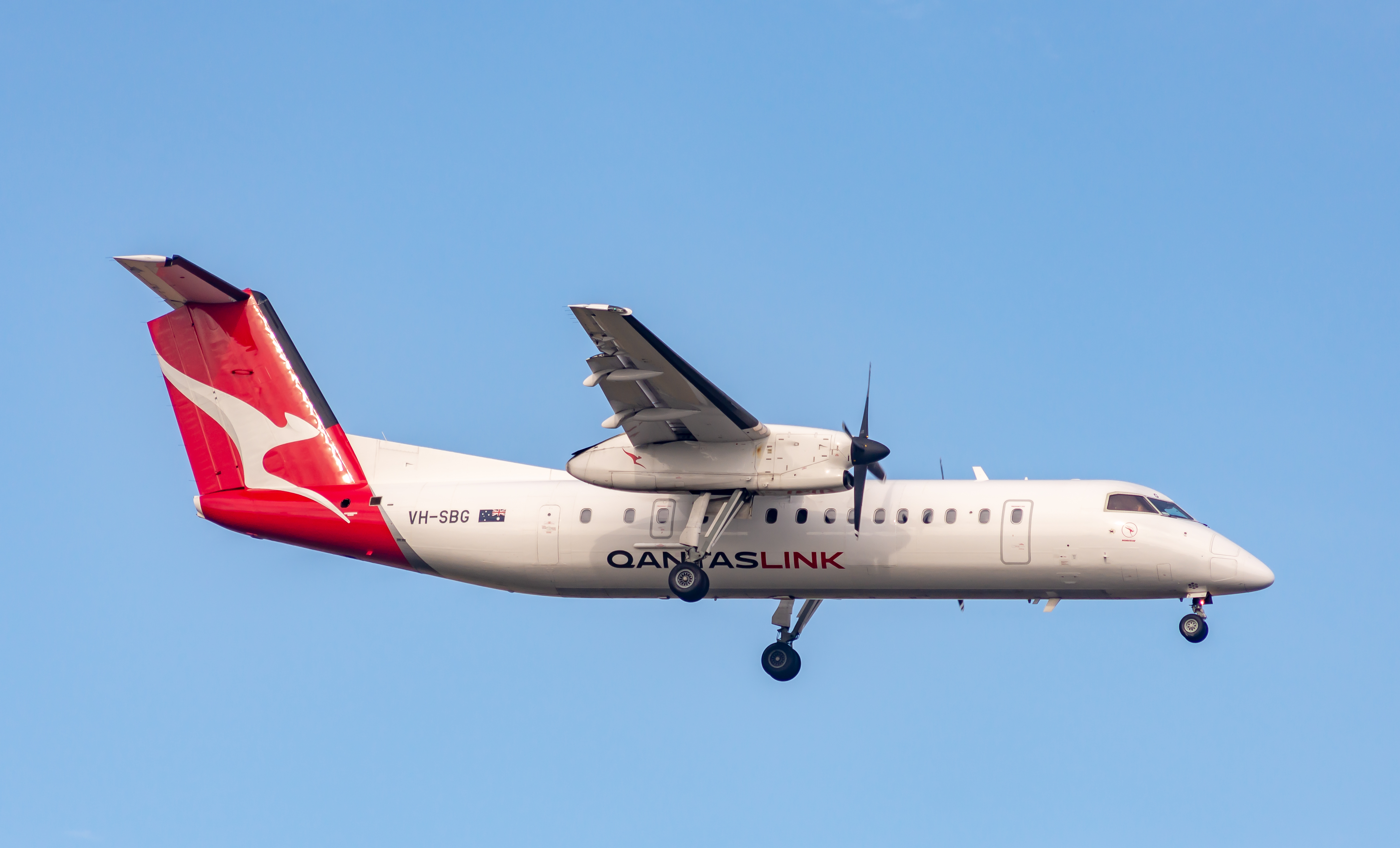
De Havilland Canada Dash 8-300 in 2022

== Destinations ==
QantasLink serves destinations through various different airlines, including Alliance Airlines, National Jet Systems, Network Aviation, and Sunstate Airlines.

=== Alliance Airlines ===
- Australia
  - Australian Capital Territory
    - Canberra – Canberra Airport
  - New South Wales
    - Albury – Albury Airport
    - Newcastle – Newcastle Airport
    - Sydney – Sydney Airport
  - Northern Territory
    - Alice Springs – Alice Springs Airport
    - Darwin – Darwin International Airport Hub
    - Nhulunbuy – Gove Airport (charter)
    - Yulara – Ayers Rock Airport
  - Queensland
    - Brisbane – Brisbane Airport Hub
    - Cairns – Cairns Airport
    - Emerald – Emerald Airport
    - Gladstone – Gladstone Airport
    - Mackay – Mackay Airport
    - Mount Isa – Mount Isa Airport
    - Rockhampton – Rockhampton Airport
    - Townsville – Townsville Airport
  - South Australia
    - Adelaide – Adelaide Airport Hub
  - Tasmania
    - Hobart – Hobart Airport
    - Launceston – Launceston Airport (seasonal)
  - Victoria
    - Melbourne – Melbourne Airport
- East Timor
  - Dili – Presidente Nicolau Lobato International Airport
- New Caledonia
  - Nouméa – La Tontouta International Airport
- Solomon Islands
  - Honiara – Honiara International Airport

=== National Jet Systems ===
- Australia
  - Australian Capital Territory
    - Canberra – Canberra Airport Hub
  - New South Wales
    - Coffs Harbour – Coffs Harbour Airport
    - Sydney – Sydney Airport
  - Northern Territory
    - Alice Springs - Alice Springs Airport (ends 14 November 2026)
  - Queensland
    - Brisbane – Brisbane Airport
    - Cairns - Cairns Airport
    - Coolangatta - Gold Coast Airport
    - Hamilton Island – Hamilton Island Airport
    - Maroochydore - Sunshine Coast Airport
    - Townsville - Townsville Airport
  - South Australia
    - Adelaide - Adelaide Airport
  - Victoria
    - Melbourne – Melbourne Airport Hub
  - Tasmania
    - Hobart – Hobart Airport Hub
    - Launceston – Launceston Airport
- New Zealand
  - Wellington - Wellington Airport

=== Network Aviation ===
- New South Wales
  - Newcastle – Newcastle Airport
- Northern Territory
  - Darwin – Darwin International Airport
- Tasmania
  - Hobart - Hobart Airport
- Western Australia
  - Broome – Broome International Airport
  - Busselton – Busselton Margaret River Airport (charter)
  - Exmouth – Learmonth Airport
  - Geraldton – Geraldton Airport
  - Kalgoorlie – Kalgoorlie-Boulder Airport
  - Karratha – Karratha Airport
  - Newman – Newman Airport
  - Onslow – Onslow Airport
  - Paraburdoo – Paraburdoo Airport
  - Perth – Perth Airport Hub
  - Port Hedland – Port Hedland International Airport
- Overseas Territories
  - Christmas Island - Christmas Island Airport
  - Cocos (Keeling) Island - Cocos (Keeling) Island Airport

=== Sunstate Airlines ===
- Australian Capital Territory
  - Canberra – Canberra Airport
- New South Wales
  - Albury – Albury Airport
  - Armidale – Armidale Airport
  - Ballina – Ballina Byron Gateway Airport
  - Broken Hill – Broken Hill Airport
  - Coffs Harbour – Coffs Harbour Airport
  - Cooma – Cooma–Snowy Mountains Airport (charter)
  - Dubbo – Dubbo City Airport
  - Griffith – Griffith Airport
  - Merimbula – Merimbula Airport
  - Moree – Moree Airport
  - Newcastle – Newcastle Airport
  - Orange – Orange Airport
  - Port Macquarie – Port Macquarie Airport
  - Sydney – Sydney Airport Hub
  - Tamworth – Tamworth Airport
  - Wagga Wagga – Wagga Wagga Airport
- Queensland
  - Barcaldine – Barcaldine Airport
  - Blackall – Blackall Airport
  - Brisbane – Brisbane Airport Hub
  - Bundaberg – Bundaberg Airport
  - Cairns – Cairns Airport Hub
  - Cloncurry – Cloncurry Airport
  - Emerald – Emerald Airport
  - Gladstone – Gladstone Airport
  - Hervey Bay – Hervey Bay Airport
  - Horn Island – Horn Island Airport
  - Longreach – Longreach Airport
  - Mackay – Mackay Airport
  - Miles – Miles Airport
  - Moranbah – Moranbah Airport
  - Mount Isa – Mount Isa Airport
  - Rockhampton – Rockhampton Airport
  - Toowoomba – Toowoomba Wellcamp Airport
  - Townsville – Townsville Airport
  - Weipa – Weipa Airport
- South Australia
  - Adelaide – Adelaide Airport Hub
  - Kingscote – Kingscote Airport
  - Port Lincoln – Port Lincoln Airport
  - Whyalla – Whyalla Airport
- Tasmania
  - Burnie – Burnie Airport
  - Devonport – Devonport Airport
  - Launceston – Launceston Airport
  - Hobart - Hobart Airport
- Victoria
  - Bendigo – Bendigo Airport
  - Melbourne – Melbourne Airport Hub
  - Mildura – Mildura Airport

== Incidents and accidents ==
- On 29 May 2003, QantasLink Flight 1737, a domestic flight from Melbourne to Launceston operated by a QantasLink Boeing 717 registered VH-NXN, was subject to an attempted hijacking.

== See also ==
- Regional airline
