= Miles Airport =

Airport in Queensland, Australia

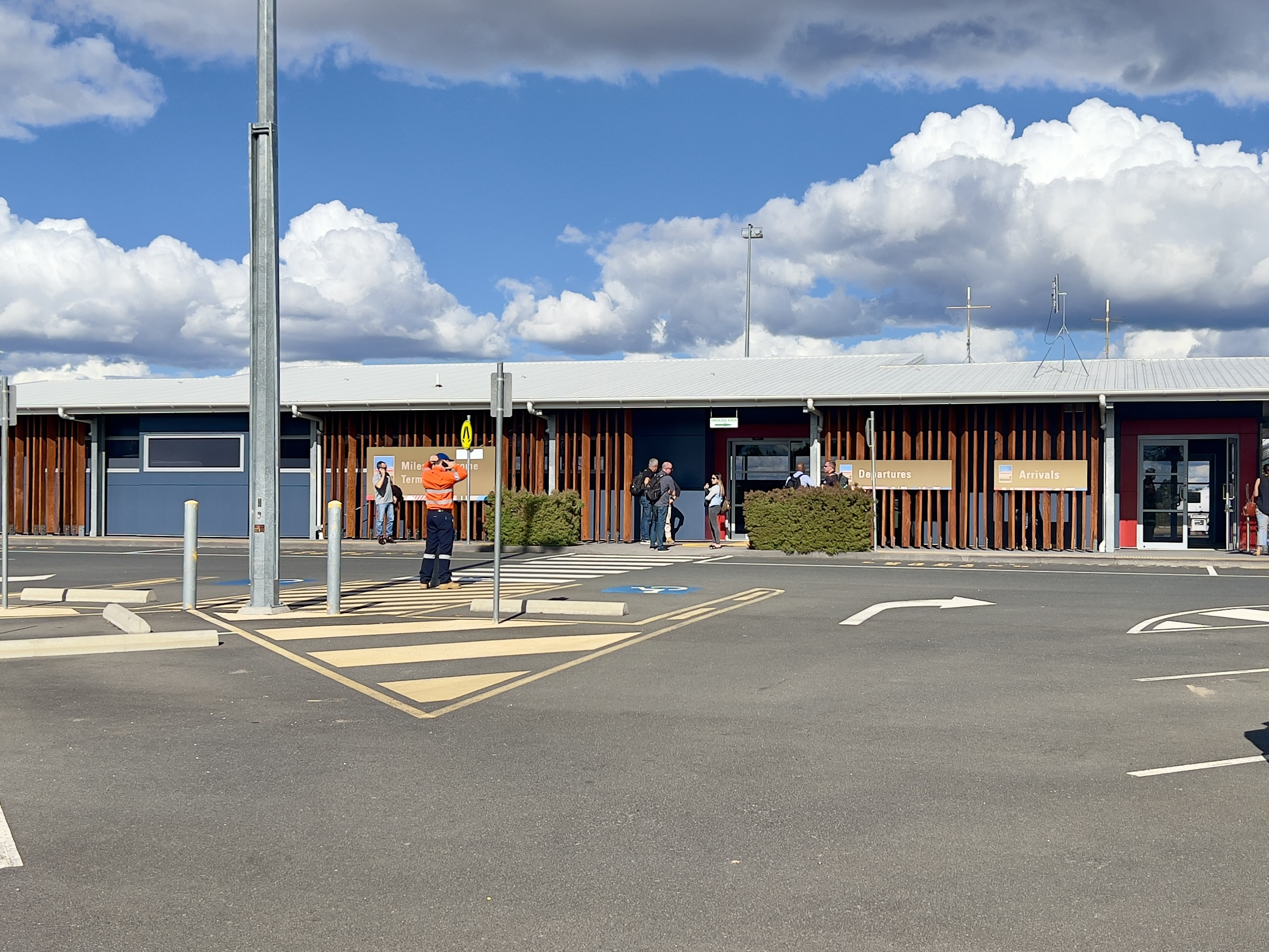
- Miles Airport Terminal, 2023
- IATA: WLE; ICAO: YMLS

Summary
- Airport type: Public
- Serves: Miles, Queensland, Australia
- Elevation AMSL: 455 m / 1,492 ft
- Coordinates: 26°48′33″S 150°09′54″E

Map
- Location of the airport in Queensland

Runways
Direction	Length		Surface
Direction	m	ft	Surface
05L/23R	1,600	5,249	Asphalt
- Sources:, STV

Miles Airport or Aerodrome (IATA: WLE, ICAO: YMLS) is an airport serving the small towns of Miles and Condamine, and surrounding rural residents in Queensland, Australia.

The airport is located along the Leichhardt Highway approximately 19 km (12 mi) south of the Leichhardt and Warrego Highway intersection, Miles, Queensland, and 14 km (8.7 mi) north of the Leichhardt Highway and Roma-Condamine Road intersection, Condamine, Queensland.

The aerodrome underwent a major expansion in 2013 to meet the Fly-in fly-out needs of the coal seam gas industry in that region (Coalbed methane), and is capable of taking aircraft with 50 to 74 seats. The runway is 1,590 meters long and 30 meters wide.

== Airlines and destinations ==
Airlines	Destinations
QantasLink	Brisbane

== See also ==
- List of airports in Queensland
- Western Downs Regional Council
- Western Downs Regional Council
