= Moranbah Airport =

- IATA: MOV; ICAO: YMRB

Summary
- Airport type: Private
- Operator: BHP Mitsubishi Alliance
- Serves: Moranbah, Queensland, Australia
- Elevation AMSL: 770 ft / 235 m
- Coordinates: 22°03′27.4″S 148°04′34.7″E

Map
- Location in Queensland

Runways
Direction	Length		Surface
Direction	m	ft	Surface
16/34	1,524	5,000	Asphalt
- Sources: Australian AIP and aerodrome chart

Moranbah Airport (IATA: MOV, ICAO: YMRB) is an airport serving Moranbah, Queensland, Australia. It is located 3.25 nautical miles (6.02 km; 3.74 mi) south of Moranbah and operated by BHP Mitsubishi Alliance, a coal mining company.

== Overview ==
The airport averages 40 QantasLink flights each week, most of these being Dash-8 Q400 aircraft. In July 2012, Virgin Australia commenced charter flight operations using Skywest ATR-72 aircraft. At one point, Virgin Australia Regional Airlines (VA) offered three daily return flights on weekdays and one on Sundays using ATR 72 aircraft, however with the withdrawal of their ATR aircraft from Queensland, the airline has now ceased operating into the airport.

In 2010, to accommodate the growth and demand for more flights, BMA provided $47 million in funding to upgrade the runway and build a new terminal. The new terminal was completed in June 2012 and now services approximately 160,000 public and charter passengers each year.

All private general aviation aircraft are required to contact BMA's Airports Team for slot times and permission to land at the aerodrome.

Hertz, Budget and Avis car rental companies all operate from the terminal. Short-term car parking is free for the first hour and $2/hr after that, or $21/day. Long term car parking is $8/day for the first 14 days and $10/day thereafter.

BMA Coal Operations Pty Ltd is a jointly owned entity of BHP and Mitsubishi Development Pty Ltd.

== Facilities ==
The airport resides at an elevation of 770 ft (235 m) above sea level. It has one runway designated 16/34 with an asphalt surface measuring 1,524 m × 30 m (5,000 ft × 98 ft).

== Airlines and destinations ==
Airlines	Destinations
Alliance Airlines	Brisbane
National Jet Express	Charter: Brisbane
QantasLink	Brisbane, Cairns
Skytrans	Cairns

== See also ==
- List of airports in Queensland
