= Bendigo Airport (Victoria) =

- IATA: BXG; ICAO: YBDG

Summary
- Airport type: Public
- Operator: City of Greater Bendigo
- Location: East Bendigo, Bendigo, Victoria
- Elevation AMSL: 705 ft (215 m)
- Coordinates: 36°44′22″S 144°19′47″E
- Website: Official website

Map
- Location in Victoria

Runways
Direction	Length		Surface
Direction	m	ft	Surface
17/35	1,600	5,249	Asphalt
05/23	767	2,516	Partially asphalt
- Sources: Australian AIP and aerodrome chart

Bendigo Airport (IATA: BXG, ICAO: YBDG) is a regional airport located in East Bendigo, 2.7 nautical miles (5.0 km; 3.1 mi) northeast of Bendigo, Victoria, Australia. The airport handles QantasLink flights to Sydney and is a base for Ambulance Victoria's HEMS 3 helicopter.

== History ==
In 2017, Bendigo Airport was upgraded with a new 1.6 km north-south runway, a new taxiway system, new lighting, and signage.

In December 2018, QantasLink announced it would operate regular passenger transport flights to Sydney with flights commencing in March 2019. The flights operated for 12 months before being suspended in March 2020 due to the COVID-19 pandemic. Flights resumed in December 2020.

In 2022, construction on a new terminal building commenced with the works to deliver a new, larger building with a check-in foyer, cafe, departure gates, and provision for a security screening area. The first stage of the new terminal development opened in June 2023, with the old terminal building demolished shortly after. The completed airport terminal opened in April 2024.

== Facilities ==
Bendigo Airport has a modern terminal building, which is located on the western side.

The airport has over 40 private hangars for small aircraft. The hangar precinct is located to the north of the terminal.

== Airlines and destinations ==
Airlines	Destinations
QantasLink	Sydney

== Statistics ==
Bendigo Airport statistics
Year	Domestic passengers	Aircraft movements	Notes
2019	18,822	513	Passenger services commenced on 31 March 2019.
2020	5,689	207	Passenger services suspended from March 2020 to December 2020 due to the COVID-19 pandemic.
2021	6,738	414	Passenger services impacted by multiple lockdowns and border closures due to the COVID-19 pandemic.
2022	20,720	833	
2023	18,812	720	
2024	21,104	659	Passenger services upgraded to larger De Havilland Canada Dash 8-400 aircraft in October 2024.
2025	29,712	538	

== Other operators ==
- Air Ambulance Victoria
- Bendigo Aviation Services (BAS)
- Bendigo Flying Club (BFC)
- Comfly - Bendigo Recreational Aviation School
- Department of Energy, Environment and Climate Action
- RMIT Flight Training School

== Accidents and incidents ==
- On 19 May 2015, a Cirrus SR22T registered VH-EPG from Moorabbin to Mildura declared a PAN PAN after smoke built up in the cockpit. On approach, the aircraft cleared a row of trees and made a final landing on runway 17. Emergency crews responded to the emergency. The pilot and passenger were not injured.
- On 17 December 2017, an ultralight plane crashed during takeoff. The aircraft was registered 23-8769. The pilot and the instructor were taken to Bendigo Hospital with minor injuries. Emergency services were called to the scene. The cause of the crash remains unknown. Recreational Aviation Australia investigated the accident.
- On 15 August 2019, an ultralight plane experienced a hard landing, resulting in a nose wheel collapse during a training flight. The aircraft was an ICP Savannah registered 24-7795. The main north–south runways 17/35 were closed for 3 hours. En route, aircraft were diverted to nearby airstrips. Emergency services responded, and firefighters used foam on a small fuel leak from the plane. The two pilots were uninjured.

== See also ==
- List of airports in Victoria
