= Griffith Airport =

Airport in Griffith, New South Wales, Australia

Griffith Regional Airport
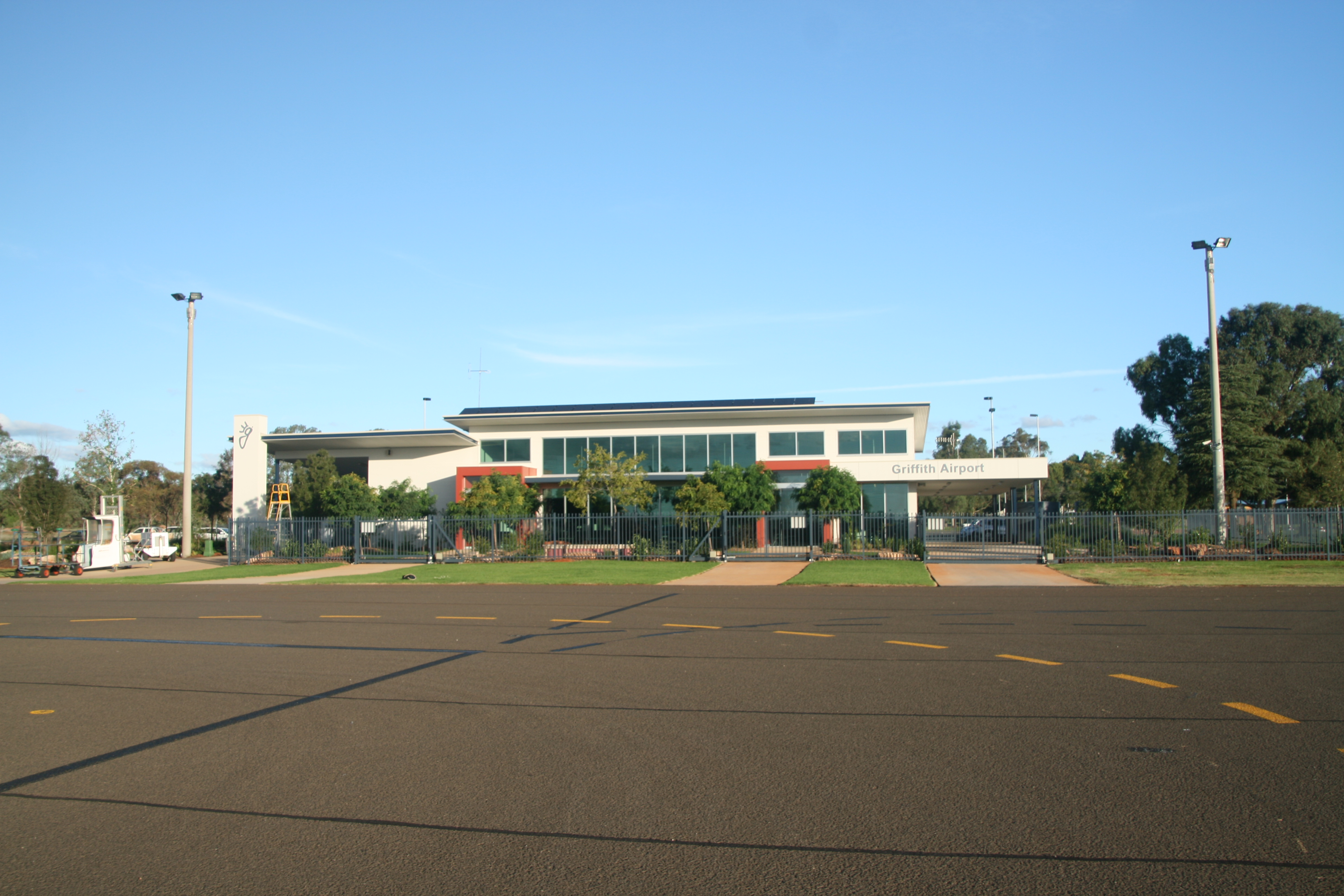
- IATA: GFF; ICAO: YGTH

Summary
- Airport type: Public
- Operator: Griffith City Council
- Serves: Griffith, New South Wales, Australia
- Elevation AMSL: 439 ft (134 m)
- Coordinates: 34°15′06″S 146°04′00″E
- Website: griffith.nsw.gov.au/Business/Airport

Map
- Location in New South Wales

Runways
Direction	Length		Surface
Direction	m	ft	Surface
06/24	1,704	5,591	Asphalt
18/36	600	1,969	Clay
- Sources: Australian AIP

Griffith Airport (IATA: GFF, ICAO: YGTH) is an airport serving Griffith, New South Wales, Australia. It is located 3 nautical miles (5.6 km; 3.5 mi) north of Griffith and operated by the Griffith City Council.

== Facilities ==
The airport is at an elevation of 439 ft (134 m) above sea level. It has two runways: 06/24 with an asphalt surface measuring 1,704 m × 30 m (5,591 ft × 98 ft) and 18/36 with a clay surface measuring 600 m × 30 m (1,969 ft × 98 ft).

== Airlines and destinations ==
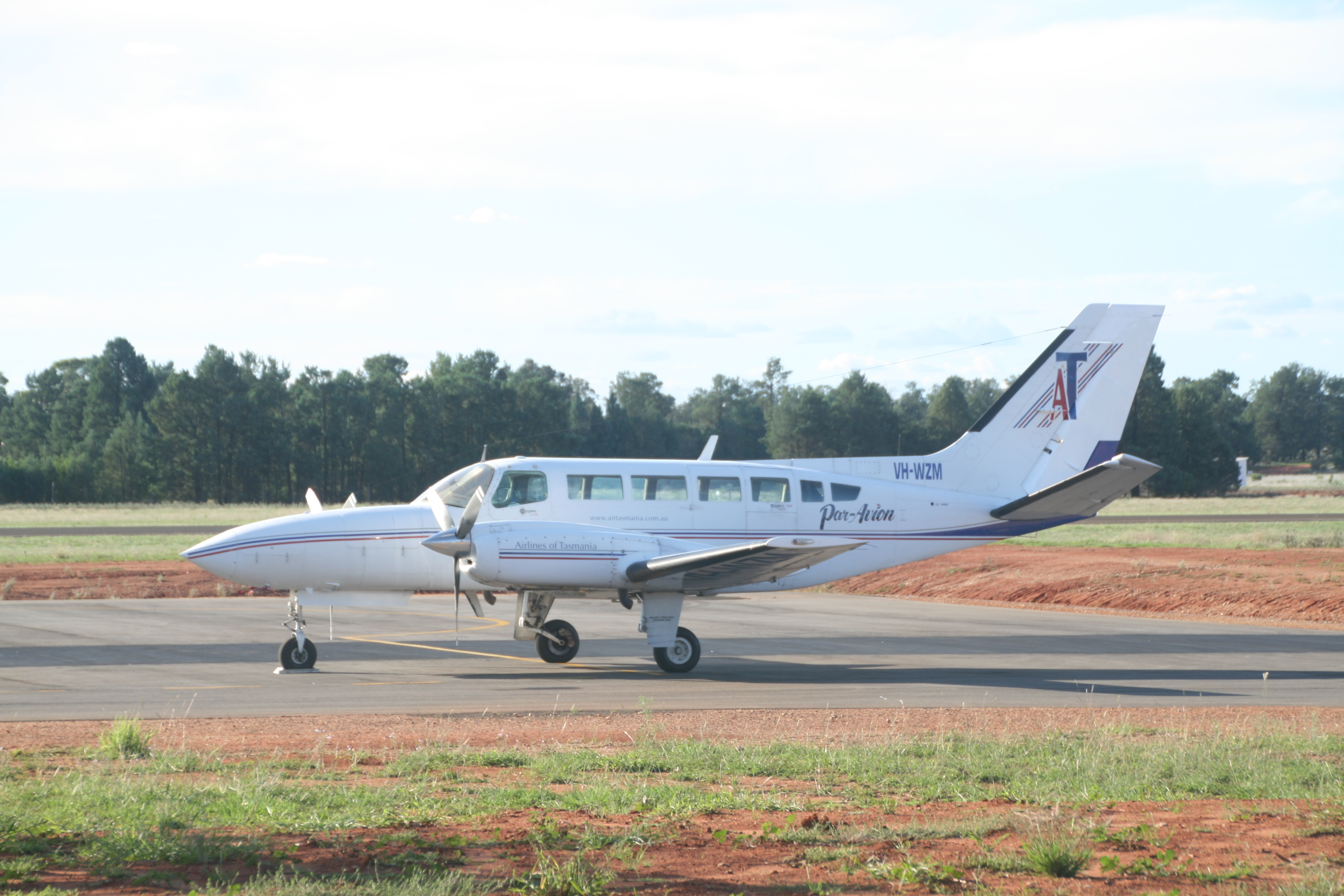
A Par-Avion Cessna 404 Titan at Griffith Airport

Airlines	Destinations
QantasLink	Sydney
Rex Airlines	Narrandera, Sydney

Sharp Airlines formerly ran services to Melbourne, which ceased in March 2022. The route was also previously operated by Rex Airlines, which ceased in July 2012.

== Statistics ==
Griffith Airport was ranked 45th in Australia for the number of revenue passengers served in calendar year 2018.

Annual passenger and aircraft statistics for Griffith Airport
Year	Revenue passengers	Aircraft movements
2001–02	31,419	2,845
2002–03	32,230	3,183
2003–04	42,596	3,232
2004–05	53,675	3,536
2005–06	60,066	3,128
2006–07	62,625	2,692
2007–08	79,430	3,937
2008–09	58,799	2,822
2009–10	64,410	3,392
2010–11	69,266	3,626
2011–12	71,200
2012–13	64,300
2013–14	67,600
2014–15	66,900
2015–16	68,600
2016–17	71,500
2017–18	75,500

== See also ==
- List of the busiest airports in Australia
- List of airports in New South Wales
