= Mildura Airport =

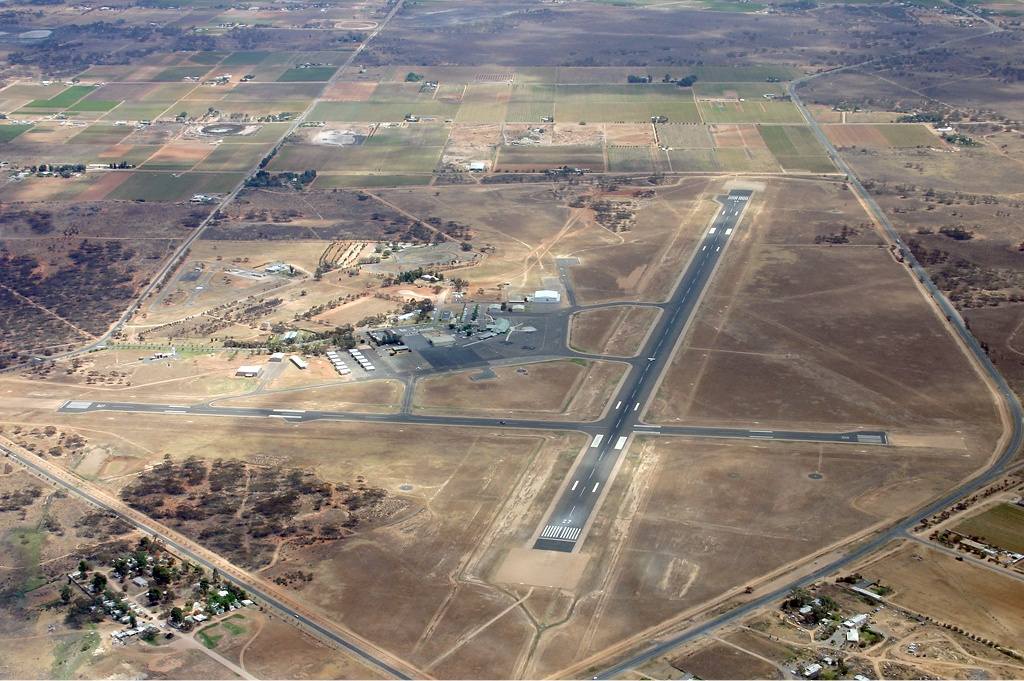
- Overview of Mildura Airport
- IATA: MQL; ICAO: YMIA; WMO: 94693

Summary
- Airport type: Public
- Operator: Mildura Airport Pty Ltd.
- Location: Mildura, Victoria, Australia
- Opened: 1923
- Elevation AMSL: 167 ft (51 m)
- Coordinates: 34°13′45″S 142°05′08″E
- Website: milduraairport.com.au

Map
- Location in Victoria YMIA (Australia)

Runways
Direction	Length		Surface
Direction	m	ft	Surface
09/27	1,830	6,004	Grooved asphalt
18/36	1,139	3,737	Asphalt

Statistics (2024)
- Passengers: 209,300
- Sources: Passenger movements from BITRE

Mildura Airport (IATA: MQL, ICAO: YMIA) is domestic airport located 4 nautical miles (7.4 km; 4.6 mi) southwest of Mildura, Victoria, Australia. It is the busiest regional airport in Victoria and the 32nd busiest Australian airport, servicing 209,300 passengers in FY 2024. It has twice been named Australia's Rural Airport of the Year.

== History ==
The airport was first established in 1920 as a landing ground for the Royal Flying Doctor Service. In 1923, the airport was officially opened as a commercial airport.

During World War II from 1942 until 1946 it was taken over by the Royal Australian Air Force as RAAF Base Mildura. From 1961 to 1976, Australia and the United States Atomic Energy Commission conducted "Project HIBAL" Upper Atmosphere Sampling at Mildura Airport.

In 1967 the Airport was used to launch balloons for the French National Center for Scientific Research.

QantasLink de Havilland Dash 8 400 and Rex Airlines Saab 340 offer scheduled air services. Virgin Australia Boeing 737-800 began the first scheduled jet service from 13 October 2008 before the route was withdrawn in 2020. It is also home to Cobden Air and the Mildura Aero Club.

Its terminal facilities underwent renovation in September 2012, a $6.4 million revamp by builders Mossop Construction + Interiors. This was completed to modernise the airport, as well as increase its passenger handling capabilities to support future air travel growth.

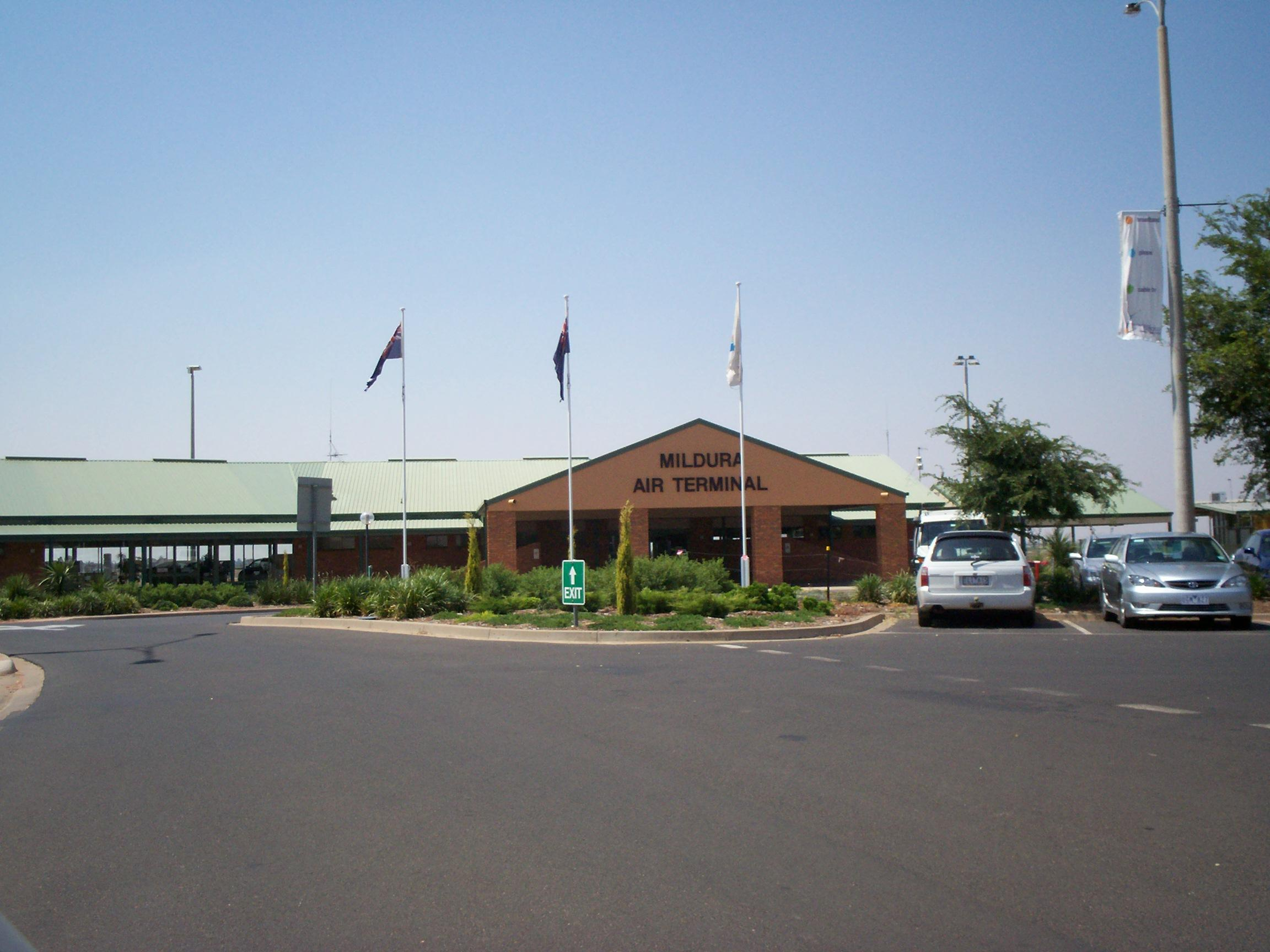
Exterior view of Mildura Airport terminal, 2007 (prior to renovations).

Flights from Mildura to the Gold Coast and the Sunshine Coast, as well as flights to Adelaide and Broken Hill were formerly operated by Bonza and Rex Airlines, respectively.

== Airlines and destinations ==
Airlines	Destinations
QantasLink	Melbourne, Sydney
Rex Airlines	Melbourne

== Operations ==
Busiest domestic routes into and out of Mildura Airport (FY 2024)
Rank	Airport	Passengers carried	% Change
1	Melbourne	159,700	▼-4.1

== Accidents and incidents ==
- On 18 June 2013, a Virgin Australia Boeing 737-800 operating a flight from Brisbane to Adelaide with 91 passengers and crew on board diverted to Mildura due to heavy fog which had closed Adelaide airport. The flight carried enough fuel to allow roughly 30 minutes holding. A Qantas 737 had also diverted to Mildura, arriving after the Virgin flight and radioed that they were running low on fuel. This was interpreted by the Virgin crew as an urgent situation and they allowed the Qantas flight to land ahead. With the airport's automated weather service unavailable and the visibility deteriorating, the Virgin flight conducted a missed approach and now critically low on fuel were forced to commit to an immediate emergency landing. Mildura was not equipped with an Instrument Landing System approach aid at the time and the crew performed the landing without visual reference to the runway on the second attempt. The aircraft landed with 535 kg (1,179 lb) remaining fuel.
- On 6 November 2015, the pilot of a Cessna 310R, on a private flight from Moorabbin, lost control and crashed on approach to land at Mildura, after the left engine was starved of fuel. The pilot was fatally injured and the aircraft destroyed.

== See also ==
- List of airports in Victoria
- Transport in Australia
