= Broken Hill Airport =

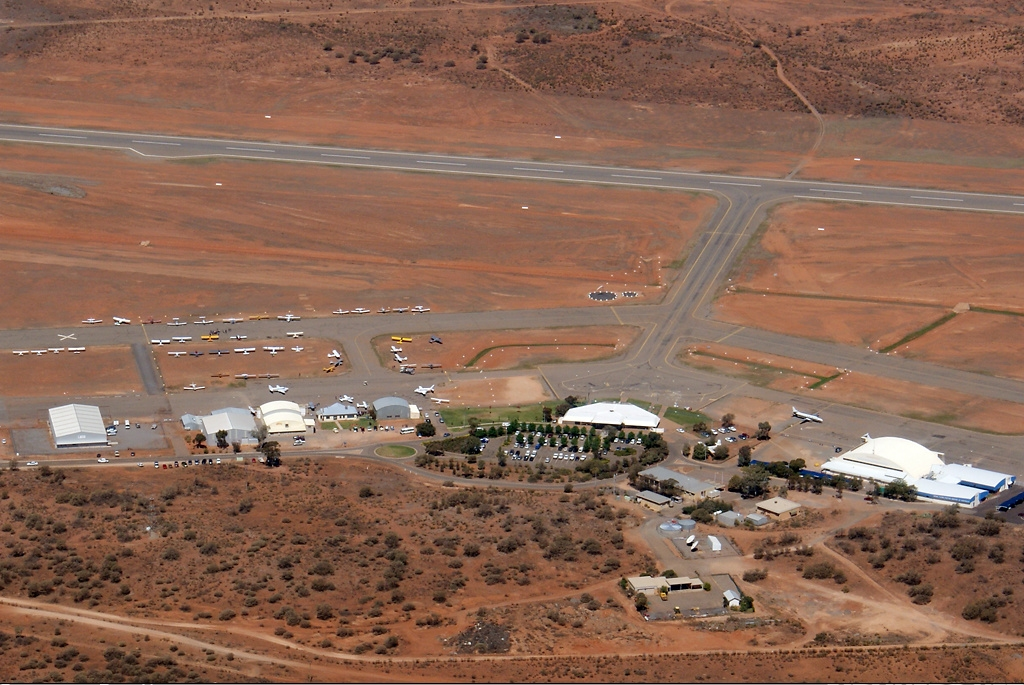
- IATA: BHQ; ICAO: YBHI

Summary
- Airport type: Public
- Operator: Council of the City of Broken Hill
- Location: Broken Hill, New South Wales
- Elevation AMSL: 959 ft / 292 m
- Coordinates: 32°00′06″S 141°28′18″E
- Website: brokenhill.nsw.gov.au

Map
- Location in New South Wales

Runways
Direction	Length		Surface
Direction	m	ft	Surface
05/23	2,515	8,251	Asphalt
14/32	1,000	3,281	Grass

Statistics (2010–11)
- Passengers: 63,098
- Aircraft movements: 2,846
- Sources: AIP, Statistics from the Bureau of Infrastructure & Transport Research Economics

Broken Hill Airport (IATA: BHQ, ICAO: YBHI) is an airport located 2.5 nautical miles (4.6 km; 2.9 mi) southeast of Broken Hill, New South Wales, Australia.

The airport is used as a base of operations for the Royal Flying Doctor Service, South Eastern Operations, thus making it a very important hub for this service.

It is also used extensively by the mining industry.

== Airlines and destinations ==
Airlines	Destinations
QantasLink	Sydney
Rex Airlines	Adelaide, Dubbo, Sydney

== Statistics ==
Broken Hill Airport was ranked 51st in Australia for the number of revenue passengers served in financial year 2009–2010.

Annual passenger and aircraft statistics for Broken Hill
Year	Revenue passengers	Aircraft movements
2001–02	28,287	1,998
2002–03	29,168	2,215
2003–04	34,457	2,313
2004–05	39,281	2,412
2005–06	43,631	2,441
2006–07	48,405	2,453
2007–08	59,561	2,841
2008–09	55,809	2,738
2009–10	60,469	2,682
2010–11	63,098	2,846
