= Rex Airlines =

Regional airline in Australia

Rex Airlines Pty. Ltd.

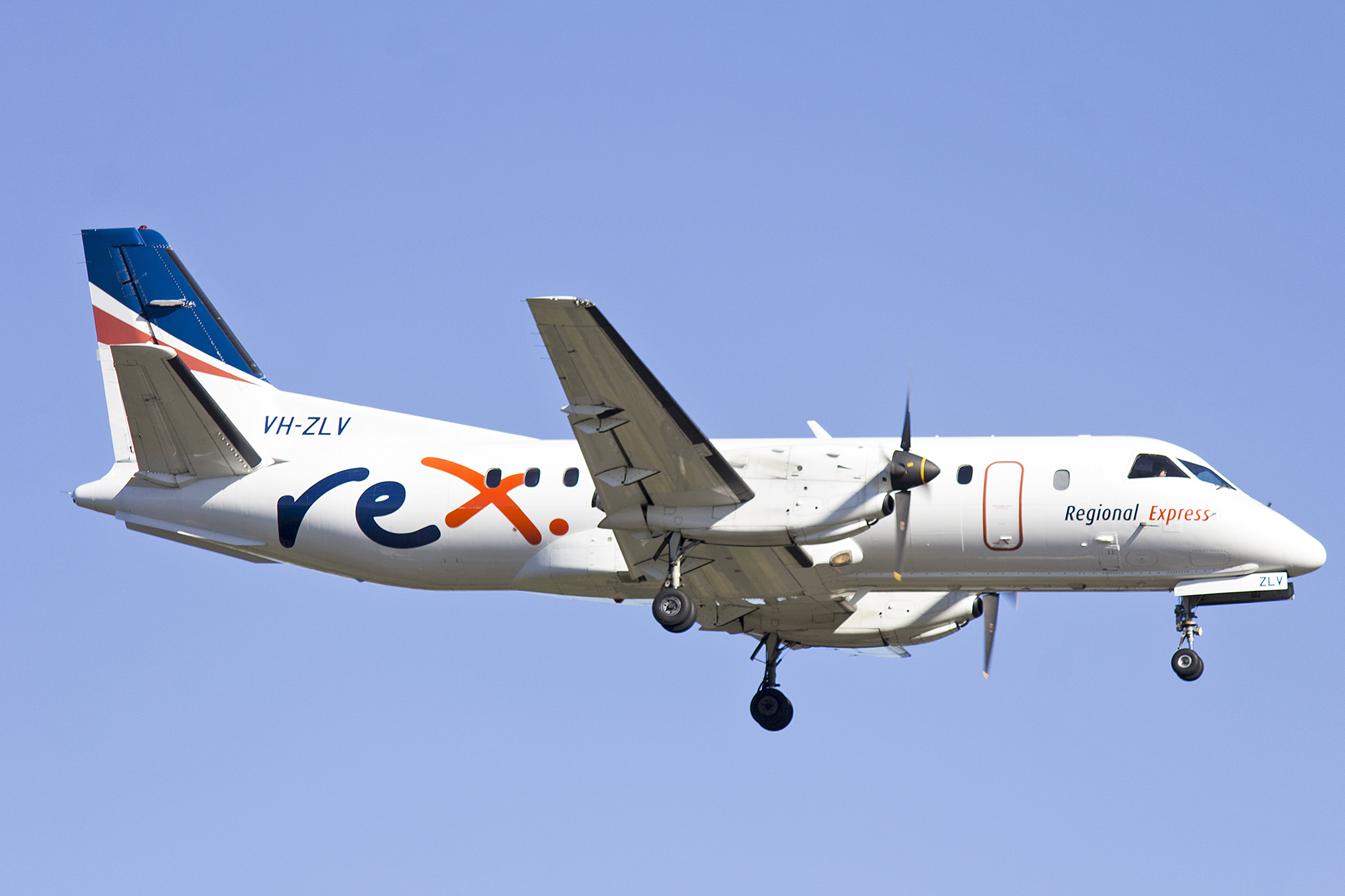
- Saab 340
IATA	ICAO	Call sign
ZL	RXA	REX
- Founded: 11 July 2002; 24 years ago (amalgamation)
- Commenced operations: 2 August 2002; 24 years ago
- AOC #: CASA.AOC.0109
- Operating bases: Adelaide; Albury; Brisbane; Cairns; Dubbo; Melbourne; Orange; Perth; Sydney; Townsville; Wagga Wagga
- Frequent-flyer program: Rex Flyer
- Fleet size: 58
- Destinations: 51
- Parent company: Regional Express Holdings
- Headquarters: Mascot, New South Wales, Australia
- Key people: Neville Howell (CEO)
- Website: www.rex.com.au

Rex Airlines Pty Ltd is an Australian regional airline based in Mascot, New South Wales. It operates scheduled regional services using turboprop aircraft. Between 2021 and 2024, Rex also operated jet services between selected major Australian cities. In July 2024, it collapsed and was placed into voluntary administration, which it exited in December 2025 after its acquisition by American airline holding company Air T.

It is the primary subsidiary of Regional Express Holdings, itself owned by American airline holding company Air T. Rex is Australia's second-largest regional airline by number of regional destinations, serving 51 regional destinations, behind QantasLink, who serve 55 regional destinations across Australia.

On 30 July 2024, the airline ceased all bookings for domestic jet service routes to capital cities and fell into voluntary administration, appointing joint administrators from EY. It came one day after Rex requested a trading halt on the Australian Securities Exchange (ASX), amid fears the airline could halt all operations. Rex continues to operate regional services, with the Government of Australia having underwritten its continuing operations.

In September 2024, two months after the commencement of the administration, no buyer was found, with fears the company could be liquidated. It did, however, previously get an extension from the Federal Court of Australia to further facilitate the sale process.

In November 2024, the company received another extension of the administration and received funding from the government to keep it afloat. It also had previously started stripping a few subsidiaries, such as Pel-Air to Toll Group.

In January 2025, the federal government bought $50 million debt from the senior lender PAG in another effort to secure the future of the airline, and supported administrators in again finding a buyer.

In October 2025, administrator EY entered a sale agreement with Air T to purchase the airline. The sale was completed on 18 December 2025.

== History ==
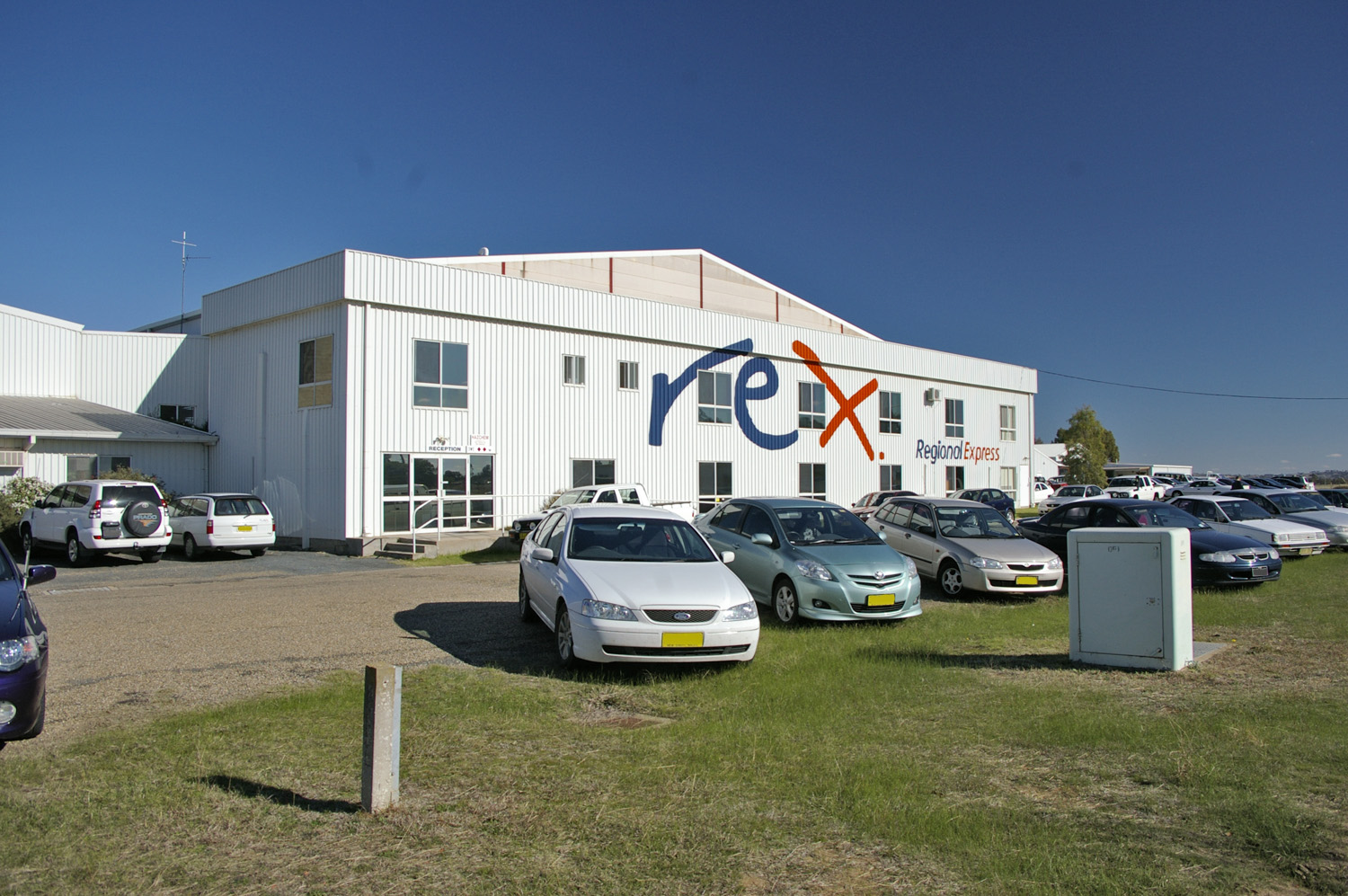
Rex's facility at Wagga Wagga Airport in June 2008

The airline was established in 2002 when the Australiawide Airlines consortium (set up by former Ansett Australia employees) acquired Hazelton Airlines and Kendell Airlines, before merging the companies and starting operations as Rex in August 2002. In 2005, Australiawide Airlines was renamed Regional Express Holdings and partially floated on the Australian Securities Exchange. On 30 November 2005, Rex announced the acquisition of the Dubbo-based Air Link, another regional airline.

In October 2007, Rex expanded into Queensland when it commenced operations between Brisbane and Maryborough. This exacerbated an existing problem within the company of not having enough pilots to crew its flights (due to the expansion of larger airlines, especially Jetstar and Virgin Blue), and Rex suspended operations out of Brisbane (and from Sydney to Cooma during the summer "low season" for this route to the NSW ski fields) in November 2007. To provide a medium-term solution to the pilot shortage, Rex announced that it was establishing a cadet-pilot flight-training programme.

In November 2015, Rex announced the resumption of services to the NSW Snowy Mountains in conjunction with Snowy Mountains Airport Corporation, with the flights resuming in March 2016. In December 2015, Rex announced that it would be commencing operations in Western Australia in February the following year after being selected by the Government of Western Australia to be the operator of regulated RPT routes after a tender process. Initially operating from Perth to Albany and Esperance, in July 2018 the Western Australian operations expanded to include Carnarvon and Monkey Mia. It brought Rex's weekly flights to roughly 1,500 across 60 destinations.

Starting on 6 April 2020, Rex significantly scaled back all its regional services due to the COVID-19 pandemic, continuing to only offer government-subsidised services within Queensland and Western Australia and one flight a week between all 54 regional and remote communities within its route network. Services including Adelaide to Port Augusta, Sydney to Newcastle and Sydney to Armidale were suspended.

In June 2020, eyeing the demise of Tigerair Australia, Rex announced interest in expanding into the domestic airline market between Sydney, Melbourne and Brisbane. Rex leased six Boeing 737-800s previously leased by Virgin Australia to operate the new services, with the first delivered in November 2020. The first jet operations began on 1 March 2021 on the Melbourne to Sydney route. Also in June 2020, Rex announced that it had entered into a memorandum of understanding with ATR to explore options for replacing the Saab 340 fleet with ATR 42 and ATR 72 aircraft. Following the airline's launch of jet services in March 2021, Rex replaced the announced Brisbane jet services in early April with services to Adelaide and Gold Coast, with the start of services occurring between 29 March and 1 April. The airline later cancelled all 737 flights and went into administration.

== Competition with Qantas ==
From late 2020 Rex publicly accused Qantas of anti-competitive conduct. After Rex announced plans to operate Boeing 737 services between capital cities, Qantas's regional subsidiary QantasLink began services on several regional routes on which Rex had been the sole operator, and Qantas added capacity on intercity routes that Rex had entered. In March 2021 Rex deputy chairman John Sharp said Qantas had embarked on a "deliberate strategy" of entering Rex's routes in an attempt to "intimidate and damage" the airline, and argued the routes carried too few passengers to sustain two operators. QantasLink chief executive John Gissing dismissed the complaint as a "classic Rex tantrum", saying "Rex's idea of competition is that it's something that happens to other people". Rex announced that it would withdraw from five regional routes—Sydney–Bathurst, Sydney–Cooma, Sydney–Grafton, Sydney–Lismore and Adelaide–Kangaroo Island—but reversed the decision later that month after the Commonwealth extended its regional route subsidies.

The Australian Competition and Consumer Commission (ACCC) examined Rex's complaints. In its March 2021 airline competition report the ACCC noted that Qantas had announced 26 new routes since the start of the pandemic and that Rex was the sole operator on only eight of them, and said that Rex's own expansion "does not suggest that the entry of Qantas on particular routes is impeding Rex from competing across the broader network" and that "competition appears to be increasing not decreasing". In June 2021 the ACCC said it would consider enforcement action if an airline's capacity or pricing practices had the purpose, effect or likely effect of substantially lessening competition. In August 2024, after Rex entered voluntary administration, the ACCC stated that it had "conducted a thorough investigation" of the concerns Rex raised in late 2020 and early 2021 and had concluded that "a range of factors impacted the competitive dynamics in the market at the time, particularly the COVID-19 movement restrictions and border closures".

The same report identified constraints on Rex's intercity expansion, including aircraft and pilot shortages, difficulty securing fleet financing, and Sydney Airport slot arrangements under which Rex's regional operations meant it "already held too many slots at the airport to be considered a 'new entrant'". Following Rex's withdrawal from capital-city routes, the ACCC reported that airfares on major city routes rose by 13.3 per cent to September 2024, and that by March 2025 the Qantas Group and Virgin Australia together carried 98.3 per cent of domestic passengers.

== Regional Express Holdings ==
Regional Express Holdings Limited
- Type: Subsidiary
- Industry: Air travel
- Founded: 2002
- Headquarters: Sydney, Australia
- Key people: John Sharp (Chairman)
- Products: Airlines, air cargo, air charter
- Revenue: A$354 million (2024)
- Net income: A$1.4 million (2024)
- Owner: Air T
- Website: www.rex.com.au

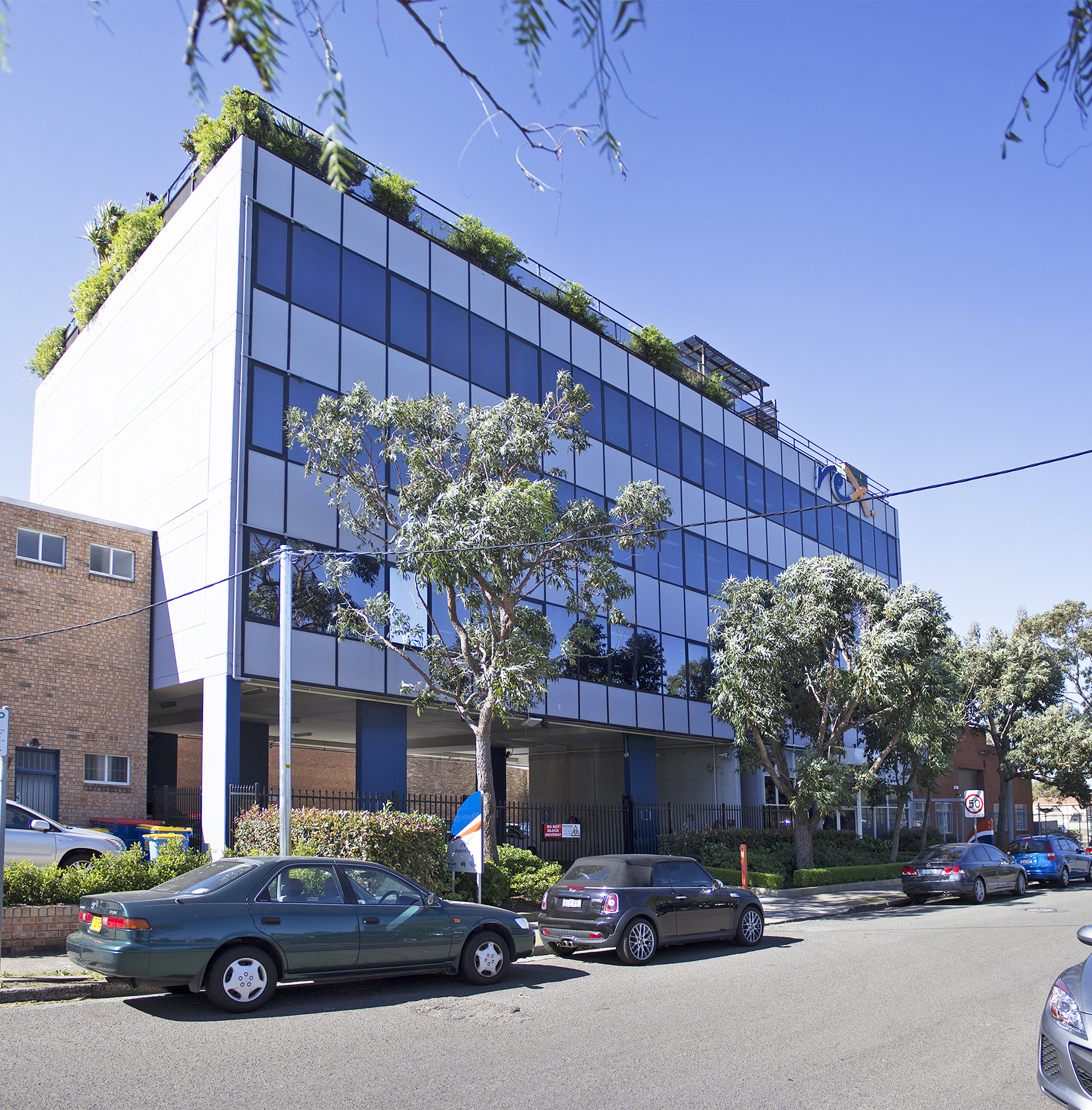
Regional Express Holdings' head office in Mascot

Regional Express Holdings is the parent company of a number of airline and associated companies in Australia. It is based in Mascot, New South Wales (a suburb of Sydney) and is a public listed company on the Australian Securities Exchange. Regional Express Holdings arose from the 2001 collapse of Ansett Airlines, which was the parent company of Kendell Airlines and Hazelton Airlines. A group of Singaporean investors and a collection of Australian private investors purchased the Hazelton and Kendell businesses, which were profitable entities before they were taken over by Ansett. The investors formed Australiawide Airlines, which was officially incorporated on 12 February 2002. The assets of the two airlines were purchased by Australiawide and merged to form the airline Regional Express, known as Rex. In 2005 Australiawide offered a percentage of the owners' shares (35 million out of 115 million shares, or 30.43%) to the public in a float. At the same time an agreement was reached with the owners of Pel-Air that Australiawide would purchase Pel-Air.

As part of the public float process, Australiawide Airlines' name was changed to Regional Express Holdings. Regional Express Holdings is the owner of a number of other companies. The main asset is Regional Express Pty Ltd. which is the company that operates the business of the airline Regional Express (Rex) and owns Rex Airlines Pty Ltd. Rex Airlines Pty Ltd was registered on the 6 July 2020 as part of Rex domestic expansion plans, responsible for issuing tickets on behalf of Regional Express Pty Limited. Another company is Air Partners Pty Ltd, which is the company that owns National Jet Express and Pel-Air and Rex Flyer. The third subsidiary company is Rex Investment Holdings Pty Ltd, which owns the Australian Aero Propeller Maintenance and Australian Airline Pilot Academies based in Wagga Wagga and Ballarat.

=== 2024 voluntary administration ===
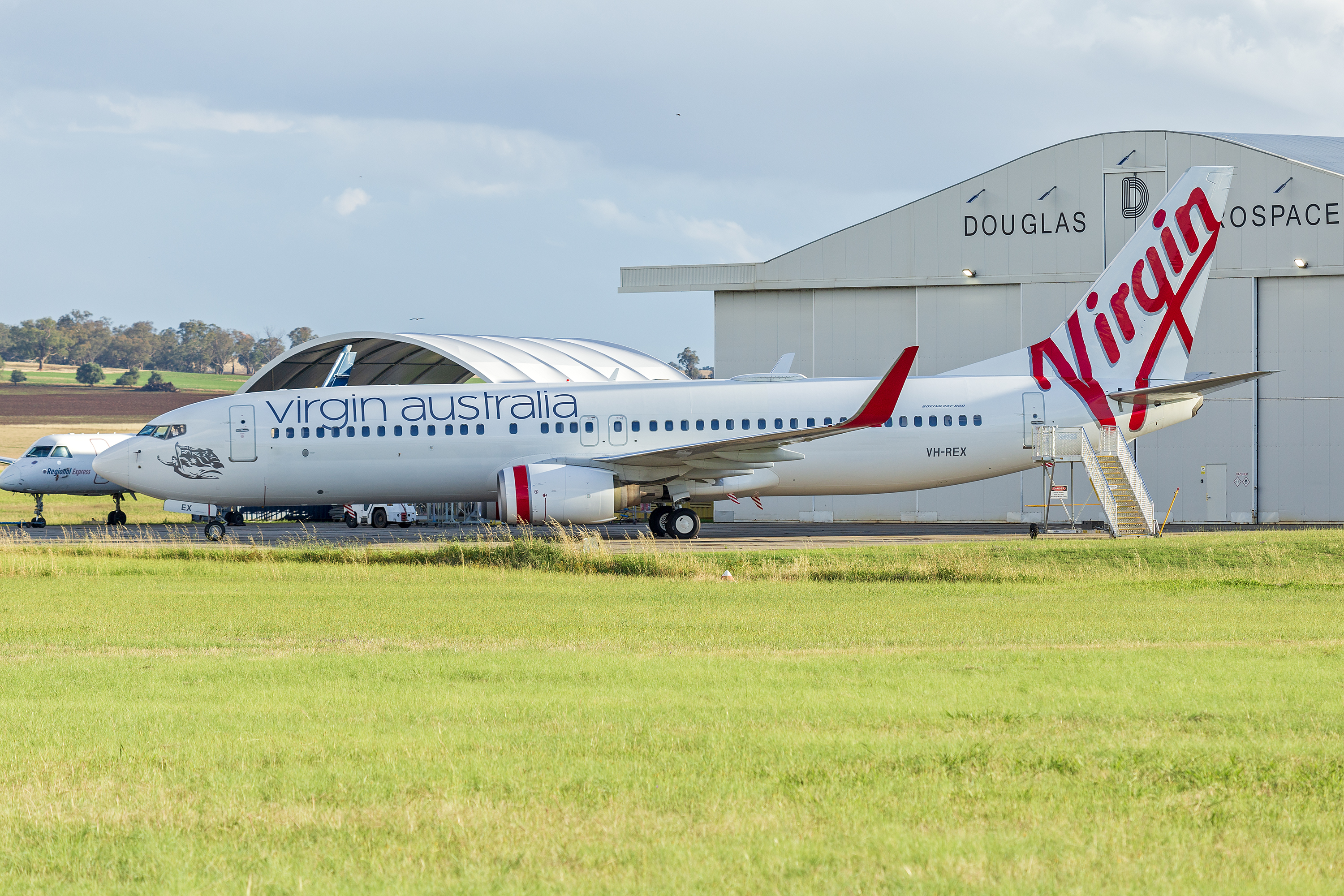
VH-REX in Virgin Australia livery

In July 2024, the company requested a trading halt. This sparked comparisons with Bonza, that had collapsed and later was wound up earlier that year, and calls by the Transport Workers' Union of Australia for government intervention, with Prime Minister Anthony Albanese asking for time and conditions and criticising the company's move away from regional service. It later suspended ticket sales with plans to exit out of the capital city market and appointed EY as administrators. Capital city flights were suspended, with an agreement reached with Virgin Australia to accommodate affected Rex customers between 30 July and 14 August 2024. On 31 July, the company was placed into voluntary administration and cancelled all capital cities flights, but continued to operate regional services. PAG has held off taking the company under receivership, with the hope that the company will be sold instead. The leases on three of its Boeing 737s were taken over by Virgin Australia.

In August, the federal government guaranteed flights with Rex or moneyback. Administrators thanked the move as added certainty for customers during the process. However, there has been no specific dollar metric set until the event of cancellation, or say on whether further intervention might be needed to support the business or find a buyer including an outright bailout. This has also drawn slight criticism from unions and the federal opposition, calling it a "stopgap measure" and calling to go further as stated, including guaranteeing staff on the Fair Entitlements Guarantee, a system that was put off in the case of Bonza, with fears also for keeping remote communities connected to transit and essential services. Meanwhile, after an extended investigation into the source of a $500 million debt or possible insolvent trading, the administrators blamed a series of factors principally a pilot shortage and other supply chain issues, ex-staff entitlements and half-empty seats for the collapse. The company is indebted to a total of 4,800 creditors including ex-staff, airports and funders.

It is estimated that the administration of Rex has resulted in about 600 job losses within the company and counting, with the assurance that business is not affected and that the staff are not being stripped right down but in fact were returned to original levels.

On 23 August, the company was granted an extension of the administration by the Federal Court of Australia to 25 November, allowing more time to process and bind expressions of interest but does not intend to use all of it to find a buyer. It was later revealed that there are reports of no real interest in buying the company and that the holding company may be either broken up and sold, placed into liquidation, and/or moved on to receivership. On 8 October, it was revealed a YouGov poll suggested high popular demand for further government intervention such as part-nationalisation of the company and setting up a separate industry commission, such as a "Safe & Secure Skies Commission", to reduce fierce monopoly and fair work and consumer affairs violations plaguing the industry.

In October 2024, Pel-Air was sold to the Toll Group. Wagga Wagga flight school, Australian Airline Pilot Academy was also put up for sale for $17 million.

In November 2024 its administration period was extended again to 30 June, with the government finally also in talks of giving the company $80 million and early access to the Fair Entitlements Guarantee. This move has angered rivals, who called out the government and administrators for not allowing for any discourse whatsoever and not looking into the greater competition or situation.

On 23 January 2025, the federal government announced it would acquire the $50 million in debt from the senior lender PAG in another effort to secure the future of the airline, becoming the new major creditor for the company and, as a creditor, filing to be a voting member in the administration's Committee of Inspection. The Government is reported to be supporting the company in finding a buyer, after the first effort did not find a buyer. While getting bipartisan support from the opposition, the announcement is made out by the government and analysts as a move to support regional areas in the near election.

On 12 February 2025, the federal government announced it would buy the airline if no buyer was found, coinciding with support of prospective buyers for the company.

In October 2025, the administrator entered a sale agreement with Air T to purchase the airline. The sale closed on 18 December 2025.

In May 2026, the federal government repaid Rex's outstanding debts to regional airports.

== Controversies ==
=== Political links criticism ===
Rex has been criticised for its close political and financial relationship with the Coalition, particularly the National Party of Australia. John Sharp, Rex's long-serving deputy chairman, was a National Party member of the Australian Parliament from 1984 to 1998. Rex has provided National Party members with flight tickets free of charge during election campaigns, and has been a donor to the party.

Rex was a substantial beneficiary of the more than $5.6 billion in Commonwealth aviation assistance committed during the COVID-19 pandemic. In May 2020 the Australian Financial Review reported that Rex had received more taxpayer funds than Qantas and Virgin Australia combined, despite being much smaller than either airline; Rex publicly disputed the comparison. The Australian National Audit Office (ANAO) subsequently reported that Rex was the largest recipient under the Regional Airline Network Support (RANS) measure, with approved funding of $64.2 million to August 2021, against $40.1 million for Qantas and $18.2 million for Virgin Australia. Across all aviation support measures, however, Rex's approved funding of $162.6 million represented 4.3 per cent of the total, compared with $2.13 billion (56.7 per cent) for Qantas and $1.08 billion (28.8 per cent) for Virgin Australia. Rex received a further $29.4 million under the JobKeeper scheme, compared with $856 million for Qantas and $285.9 million for Virgin Australia. The ANAO also found that Qantas and Virgin Australia were consulted on the design of every domestic support measure for which they were eligible, including RANS, while Rex and other regional operators were consulted on the design of only one measure.

In response to that reporting, the then-Labor opposition accused the then-Coalition Government of "supporting their National Party mates", a reference to the close friendship between John Sharp and then-deputy Prime Minister and Transport Minister Michael McCormack, who approved the funding. McCormack said in 2024 that he had been accused of being "the Minister for Rex" and "wore that as a badge of honour", while acknowledging that Rex had taken advantage of its rescue package.

In 2022, the year the Coalition lost government federally, Rex named a newly delivered 737-800 aircraft after McCormack at the airline's 20th anniversary celebrations.

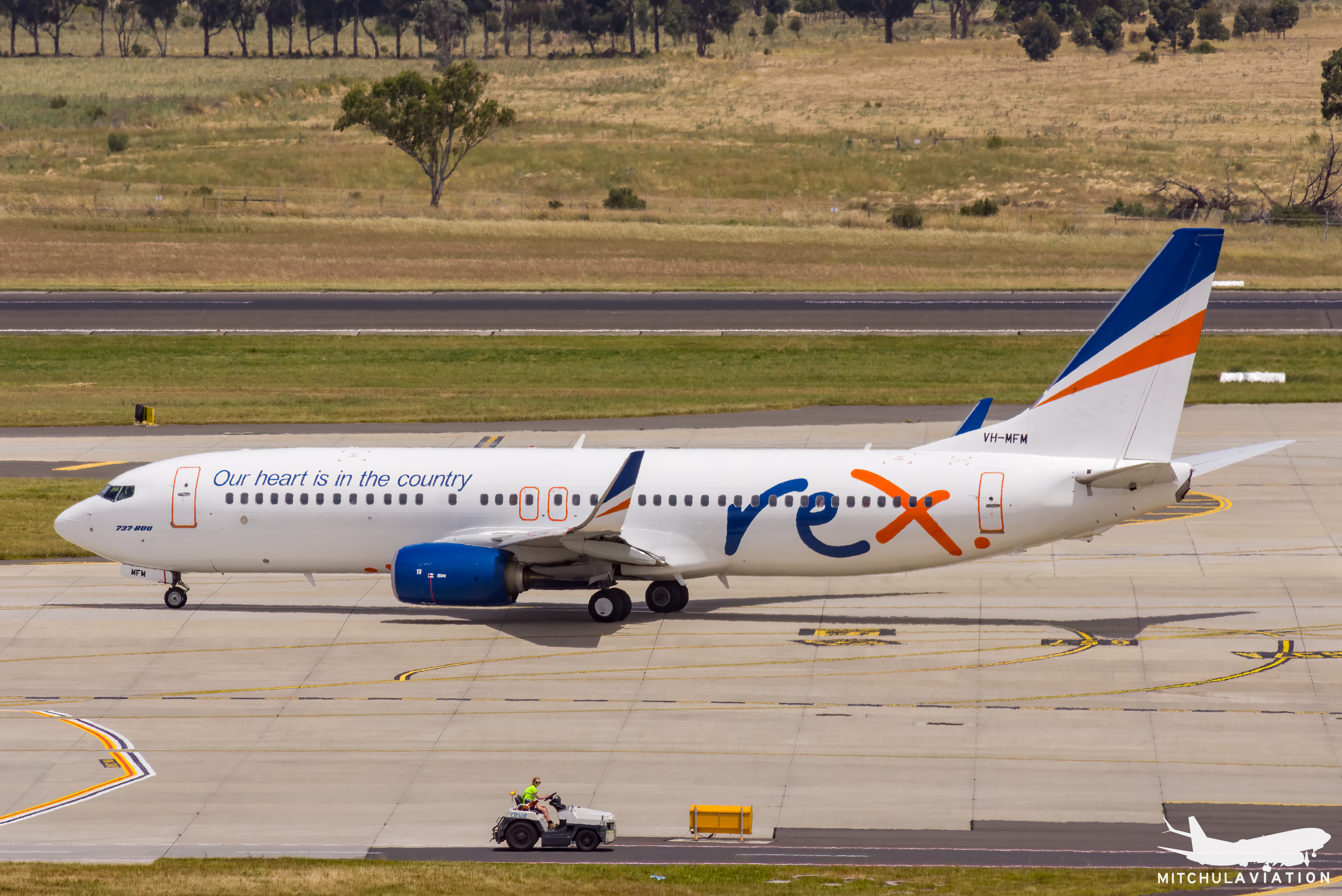
VH-MFM, Rex Boeing 737-800. The registration MFM stood for the initials of “Michael Francis McCormack” from its delivery to Rex in 2022 until the aircraft’s withdrawal from service after Rex’s collapse in 2024.

Commonwealth support for Rex was not confined to Coalition governments. After the airline entered voluntary administration in July 2024, the Albanese Labor government provided an $80 million funding facility, acquired $50 million of Rex's debt from senior lender PAG, and in November 2025 restructured about $90 million of debt owed to the Commonwealth and extended a new $60 million loan to support Air T's acquisition of the airline.

=== Hostilities with Australian regional councils ===
Since its inception, Rex has been involved in tense public disputes with many regional councils in Australia, whom operate many regional airports, over airport fees, high airfares and alleged price gouging, airport security costs, operational requirements as well as negative comments about the airline made by regional mayors and councillors, and have made various threats with the intention of pressuring councils to the point where they succumb to satisfying the company's demands. Threats made by Rex, which in many cases have been followed through, have included temporary or permanent suspension of flights to relevant cities and towns, alleged acts of blackmailing councils, and banning councillors from flying with the airline. In some cases Rex has directly withdrawn flights to towns in response, without engaging with affected councils. In some cases, Rex's withdrawal of services has left many towns across Australia without an air service.

=== Arizona aircraft theft ===
In September 2024, it was revealed that USA-based firm Jet Midwest Group filed a US$7,200,000 (AU$10,737,760) lawsuit alleging Rex unlawfully dismantled parts and scrapped 4 SAAB 340 aircraft in the firm's possession when they were stored at an aircraft boneyard in Kingman Airport, Arizona. The lawsuit, filed by the firm in the Supreme Court of New South Wales, alleges Rex instructed a third party to remove these parts, which included engines and propellers, as well as to scrap the airframes, and profited from the sale of these components.

The litigant was soon deterred from proceeding by the court, which agreed with the administrators citing that it would be a huge "costly" logistical distraction from the company which will affect the efficacy of the administration. Jet Midwest backed out agreeing that there is no "urgency" in the claim seeing it even took 4 years to take action.

=== ASIC lawsuit ===
In December 2024, following an investigation regarding an ASX tipoff, the Australian Securities & Investments Commission began legal proceedings against four former directors of the company over allegations of deceptive and misleading conduct and dereliction of directorial duty regarding accurately and timely reporting the company's financial performance to the market leading up to its collapse. The regulator alleges it was making baseless, disingenuous claims to investors regarding its financial position which also contradicted a massive $35 million profit downgrade forecast. The regulator clarified it is not looking to personally fine the company (especially "given its current circumstances") or claim outright insolvent trading, but leave it to the Supreme Court of New South Wales to declare contravention first which then may result in fines or bans targeted at the offenders themselves.

ASIC later alleged that Rex told investors it shall receive a full-year profit, whilst reeling from a EBT $7 million loss in February 2023 following a $109 million loss in 2022 and seeking $10 million funding citing its cash reserves being "critically low" and "disappointingly and bewilderingly" terrible sales. The airline would ultimately still go on to make a $32 million loss that year in total.

In October 2026, executive chairman Lim Kim Hai was fined $800,000 and banned from directing a company for 4 years. Charges against the other defendants were dropped by the Supreme Court. ASIC is appealing the decision to drop the charges.

== Destinations ==
Rex Airlines initially offered regional flights from various bases across Australia using turboprop aircraft, but in March 2021 began flying between its bases using jet aircraft with flights between Melbourne and Sydney. Prior to its voluntary administration in July 2024, its domestic flights were between Melbourne, Sydney, Brisbane, Canberra, Gold Coast, Adelaide and Hobart.

Rex Airlines operates to the following 45 destinations as of August 2023:

State/territory	City	Airport	Notes	Refs
Australian Capital Territory	Canberra	Canberra Airport	Terminated	
New South Wales	Albury	Albury Airport		
New South Wales	Armidale	Armidale Airport		
New South Wales	Broken Hill	Broken Hill Airport		
New South Wales	Coffs Harbour	Coffs Harbour Airport		
New South Wales	Dubbo	Dubbo Regional Airport		
New South Wales	Griffith	Griffith Airport		
New South Wales	Merimbula	Merimbula Airport		
New South Wales	Moruya	Moruya Airport		
New South Wales	Narrandera	Narrandera Airport		
New South Wales	Orange	Orange Airport		
New South Wales	Parkes	Parkes Airport		
New South Wales	Port Macquarie	Port Macquarie Airport		
New South Wales	Sydney	Sydney Airport	Base	
New South Wales	Wagga Wagga	Wagga Wagga Airport	Heavy Maintenance	
Queensland	Bamaga	Northern Peninsula Airport		
Queensland	Bedourie	Bedourie Airport		
Queensland	Birdsville	Birdsville Airport		
Queensland	Boulia	Boulia Airport		
Queensland	Brisbane	Brisbane Airport	Base	
Queensland	Burketown	Burketown Airport		
Queensland	Cairns	Cairns Airport	Base	
Queensland	Charleville	Charleville Airport		
Queensland	Cunnamulla	Cunnamulla Airport		
Queensland	Doomadgee	Doomadgee Airport		
Queensland	Gold Coast	Gold Coast Airport	Terminated	
Queensland	Hughenden	Hughenden Airport		
Queensland	Julia Creek	Julia Creek Airport		
Queensland	Karumba	Karumba Airport		
Queensland	Longreach	Longreach Airport		
Queensland	Mornington Island	Mornington Island Airport		
Queensland	Mount Isa	Mount Isa Airport		
Queensland	Normanton	Normanton Airport		
Queensland	Quilpie	Quilpie Airport		
Queensland	Roma	Roma Airport		
Queensland	Richmond	Richmond Airport		
Queensland	St George	St George Airport		
Queensland	Thargomindah	Thargomindah Airport		
Queensland	Toowoomba	Toowoomba Wellcamp Airport		
Queensland	Townsville	Townsville Airport	Base	
Queensland	Windorah	Windorah Airport		
Queensland	Winton	Winton Airport		
South Australia	Adelaide	Adelaide Airport	Base	
South Australia	Ceduna	Ceduna Airport		
South Australia	Coober Pedy	Coober Pedy Airport		
South Australia	Kingsscote	Kingscote/Kangaroo Island Airport	Terminated	
South Australia	Mount Gambier	Mount Gambier Airport		
South Australia	Port Augusta	Port Augusta Airport	Terminated	
South Australia	Port Lincoln	Port Lincoln Airport		
Tasmania	Burnie	Burnie Airport		
Tasmania	Devonport	Devonport Airport		
Tasmania	Hobart	Hobart Airport	Terminated	
Tasmania	King Island	King Island Airport		
Victoria	Melbourne	Melbourne Airport	Base	
Victoria	Mildura	Mildura Airport		
Western Australia	Albany	Albany Airport		
Western Australia	Carnarvon	Carnarvon Airport		
Western Australia	Esperance	Esperance Airport		
Western Australia	Monkey Mia	Shark Bay Airport		
Western Australia	Perth	Perth Airport	Base	

=== Interline agreements ===
Rex Airlines currently has Interline agreements with Etihad Airways and Delta Air Lines.

== Fleet ==
Current fleet of Rex Airlines

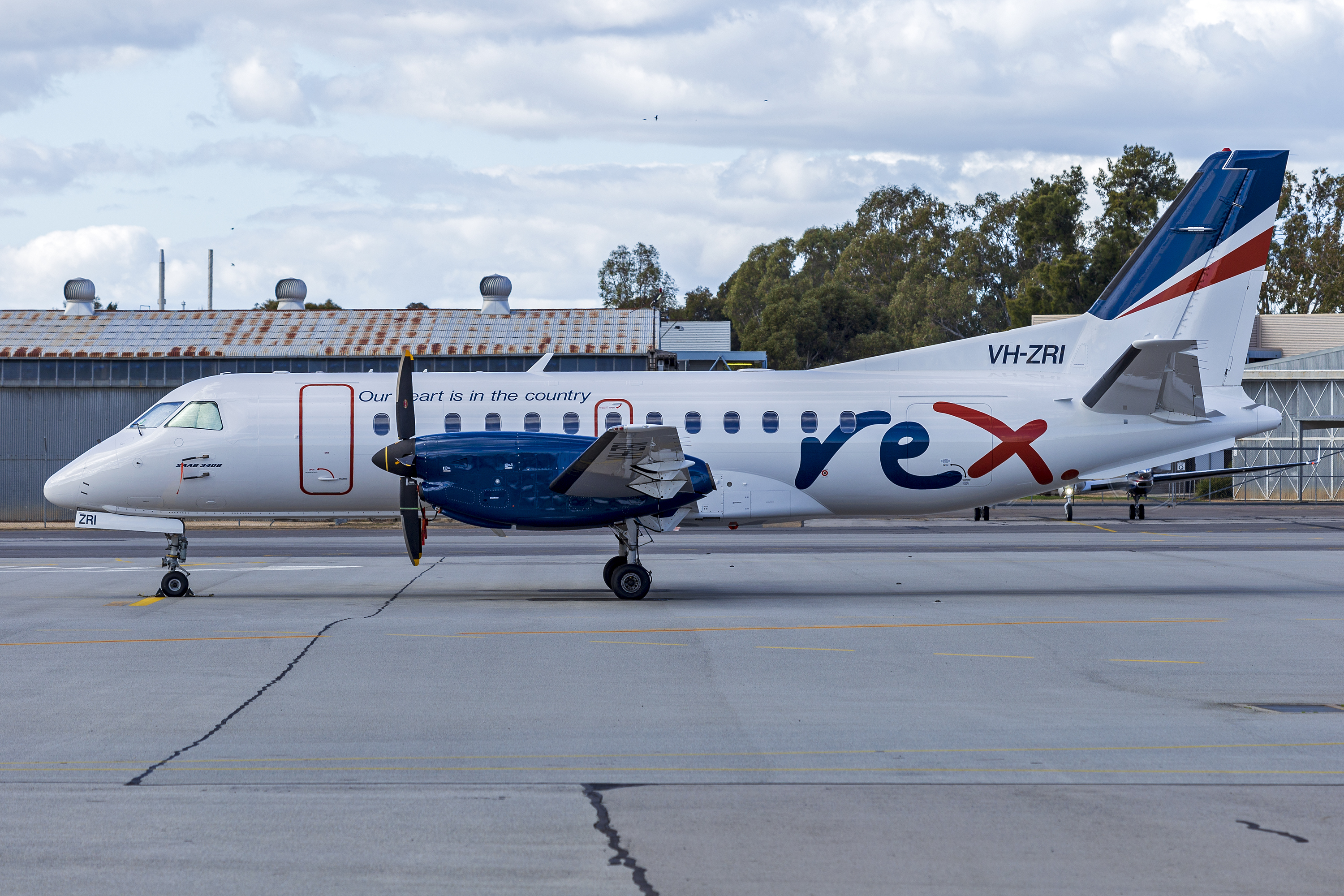
Saab 340B

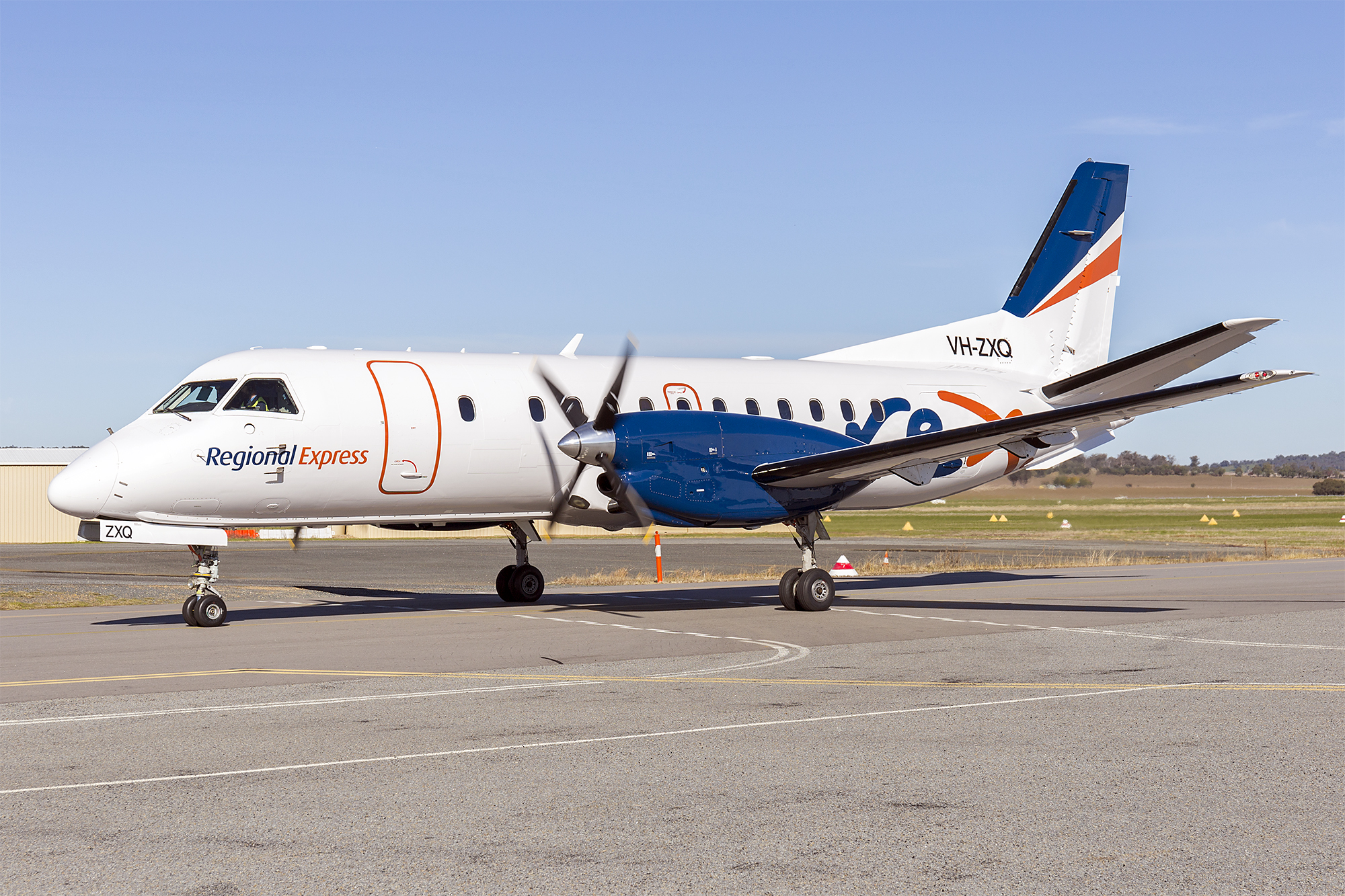
Saab 340B+WT

=== Current fleet ===
As of August 2025, Rex Airlines operates the following aircraft:

Rex Airlines fleet
Aircraft	In service	Orders	Passengers		Notes
Aircraft	In service	Orders	Y	Total	Notes
Saab 340	57	—	30	30	
Saab 340	57	—	33	33	
Saab 340	57	—	34	34	
Saab 340	57	—	36	36	
Total	57	—			

=== Former fleet ===
Former fleet of Rex Airlines

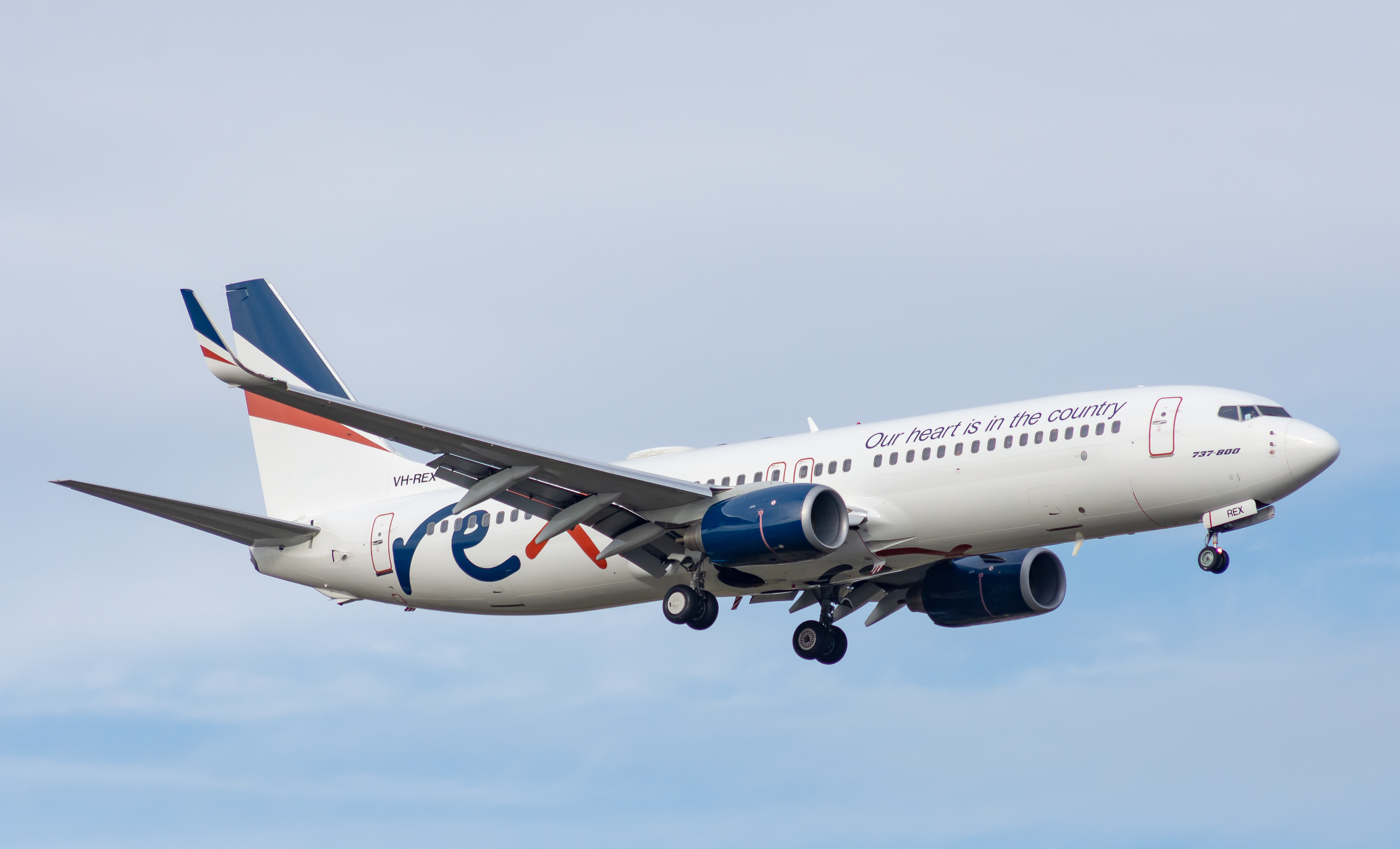
Rex Boeing 737-800

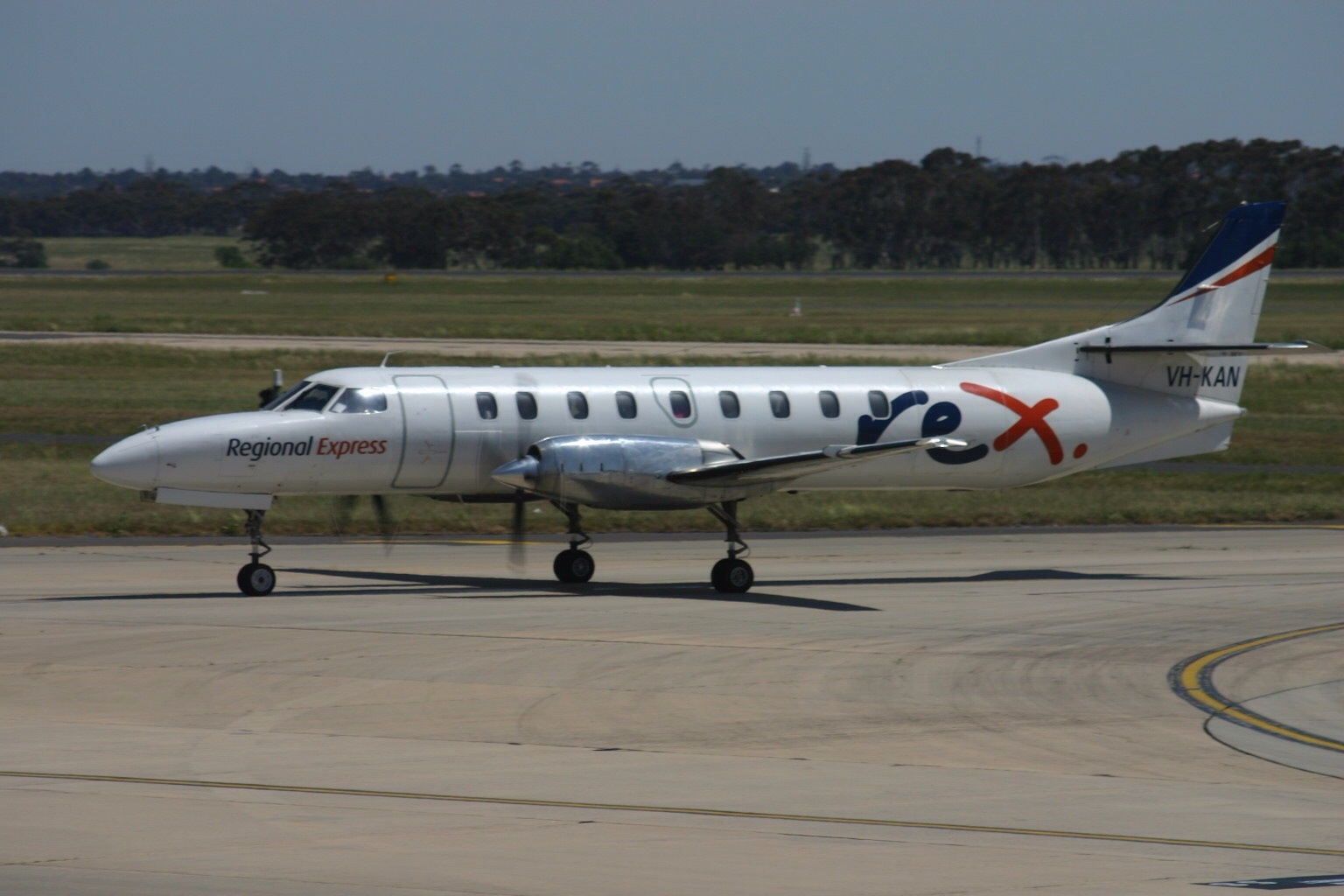
Rex Fairchild Metro 23

Rex Airlines has previously operated the following aircraft:

Rex Air former fleet
Aircraft	Total	Introduced	Retired	Notes
Boeing 737-800	10	2020	2024	Grounded due to administration.
Fairchild Metro 23	7	2002	2006	Inherited from Kendell Airlines.

=== Fleet development ===
Rex operates the world's largest fleet of Saab 340 aircraft. The delivery of 25 ex-American Eagle Airlines Saab 340B Plus aircraft started in mid-2007 and enabled the expansion of services and the phase-out of the airline's Saab 340As, and some older B models. The 340B Plus has a quieter and more comfortable interior.

In July 2008 the company announced that all of its 340As would be phased out; however one rejoined the fleet in July 2015 after a 7-year stint with Rex's subsidiary airline Pel-Air and remains in service as of January 2020.

The airline also previously operated some Fairchild Metro 23 aircraft seating 19 passengers, but the aircraft were later phased out.

The airline operated an all-Saab 340 fleet with three variants of the type until December 2020, when the airline commenced jet aircraft operations following the delivery of its first Boeing 737-800.

== Incidents and accidents ==
- On 21 February 2016, a Regional Express Airlines Saab 340B, registered VH-ZLA, was forced to take evasive action to avoid a glider while operating from Orange Airport. The Australian Transport Safety Bureau (ATSB) found the Rex aircraft was climbing through 7,500 ft after departing Orange when the crew sighted the glider in "close proximity", and took evasive action.
- On 17 March 2017, the right propeller sheared off a Regional Express Saab 340B, registered VH-NRX, while operating flight ZL768 from Albury to Sydney. The pilot made a pan-pan call but was able to land the plane without incident. The ATSB after investigating found a fatigue crack in the engine's propeller mounting flange.
- On 23 March 2017 a Regional Express SAAB 340B, registered VH-RXS, experienced in-flight engine failure after departing from Dubbo Airport. As the aircraft climbed through about 4,300 ft, a bearing in the right engine failed, damaging the compressor and leading to complete failure of the engine. The flight crew heard several bangs from the engine accompanied by jolts through the aircraft.
- On 29 August 2019, a Regional Express Saab 340B, registration VH-RXX, experienced an engine failure while departing from Moruya Airport. The crew noticed a right engine fire indication, followed by a surge and a loud bang, and cabin crew observed a bright flash. The aircraft landed at the planned destination of Merimbula without further incident. The ATSB discovered that the indication and subsequent engine failure was caused by an internal oil fire weakening the turbine blades.
- On 8 May 2019, Regional Express Saab 340B aircraft, registered VH-OLM, descent below minimum safe altitude, 15 km south-west of Newcastle Airport. The ATSB found the flight crew had misjudged the aircraft's position relative to the aerodrome while conducting a night visual approach.
- On 20 August 2019 a Regional Express, Saab Aircraft Company 340B, registration VH-ZLX, departed Adelaide, for a regular public transport flight to Port Lincoln, South Australia. During the post flight walk around, the first officer noted that the left main outboard landing gear tyre was deflated and that a piece of the wheel was missing. Ground support personnel at Adelaide Airport subsequently located the missing section of wheel on the runway strip. An area of fatigue cracking in the wheel. It was considered likely that the fatigue crack was present at the most recent maintenance visit, however, it had not been detected.
- 6 July 2021, a Saab 340B aircraft, registered VH-ZLJ, departed Perth Airport for a scheduled passenger flight to Albany, Western Australia. At about 1623, while climbing through an altitude of 6,000 ft, and before entering icing conditions, the crew activated the engine anti-ice and wing de-ice systems. Shortly afterwards, caution lights illuminated indicating a fault in the de-ice system. After levelling off at 7,000 ft, the crew actioned the relevant abnormal checklist, but the caution lights remained on. In response, the flight crew requested a descent to 5,000 ft to exit icing conditions and decided to return to Perth. ATC instructed the crew to make a right turn. About 20 seconds after beginning the turn, the aircraft’s aerodynamic stall warning stick shakers activated. The first officer initiated the stall recovery procedure before the captain took control as pilot flying to complete the recovery. The aircraft returned to Perth, landing at 1642.
- 5 April 2022, a Regional Express SAAB 340B aircraft, registered VH-ZRK, was being prepared for an air transport flight from Melbourne, Victoria to King Island, Tasmania. The scheduled departure time was 1445 local time. Interrupted engine start and evacuation. Two passengers received minor injuries during the evacuation.
- 4 November 2022, rejected take-off involving SAAB 340, VH-ZRC, at Flinders Island Airport, Tasmania. During the take-off roll, the aircraft veered to the left and the crew detected abnormal airspeed indications before rejecting the take-off, resulting in four landing gear tyres deflating.
- 21 December 2022, SAAB 340B aircraft, registered VH-RXE, that occurred about 140 km from Perth, Western Australia. During cruise, the no. 2 engine failed, and the crew returned the aircraft to Perth.

== Flight school ==
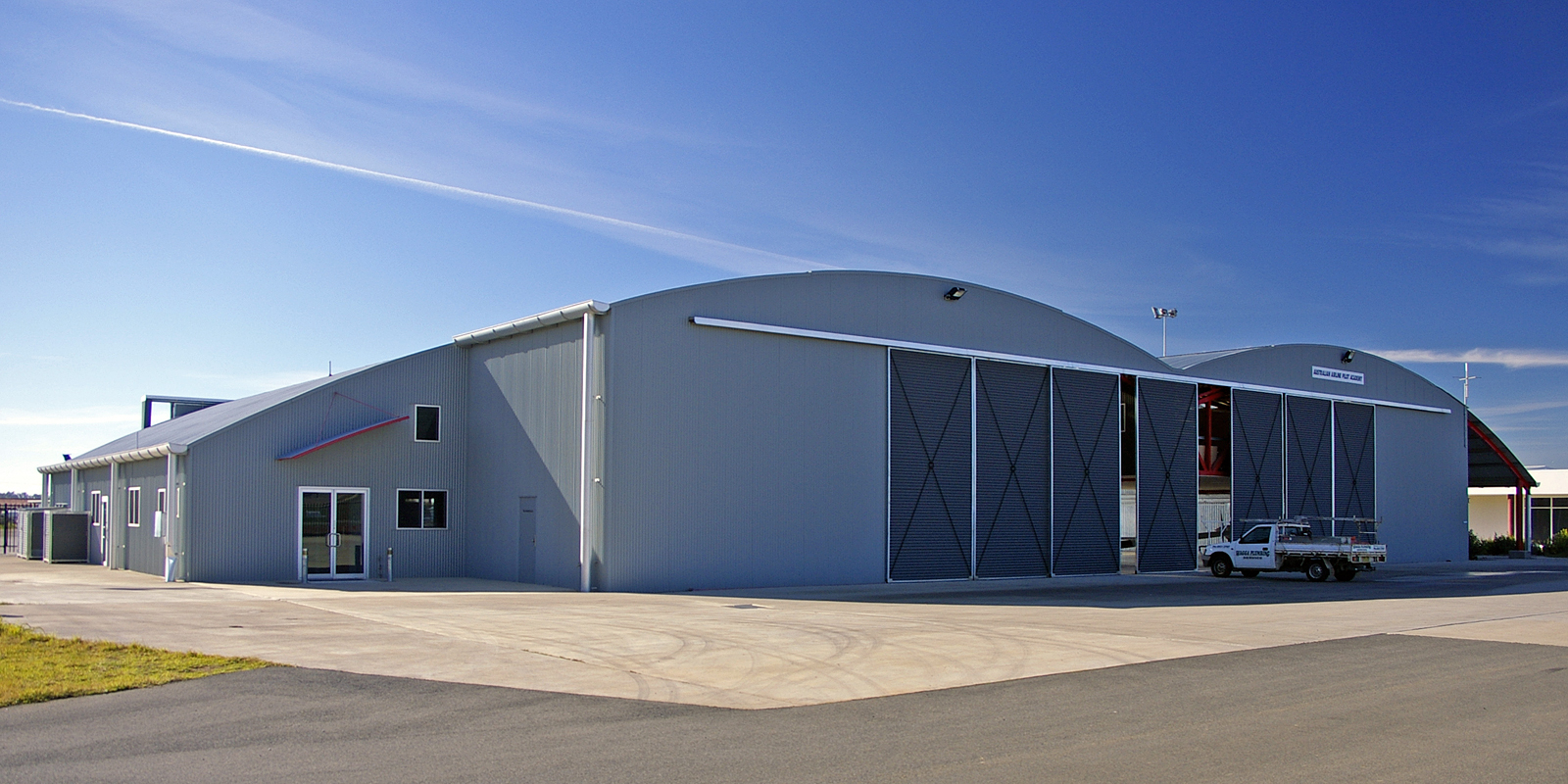
Australian Airline Pilot Academy hangar at Wagga Wagga Airport

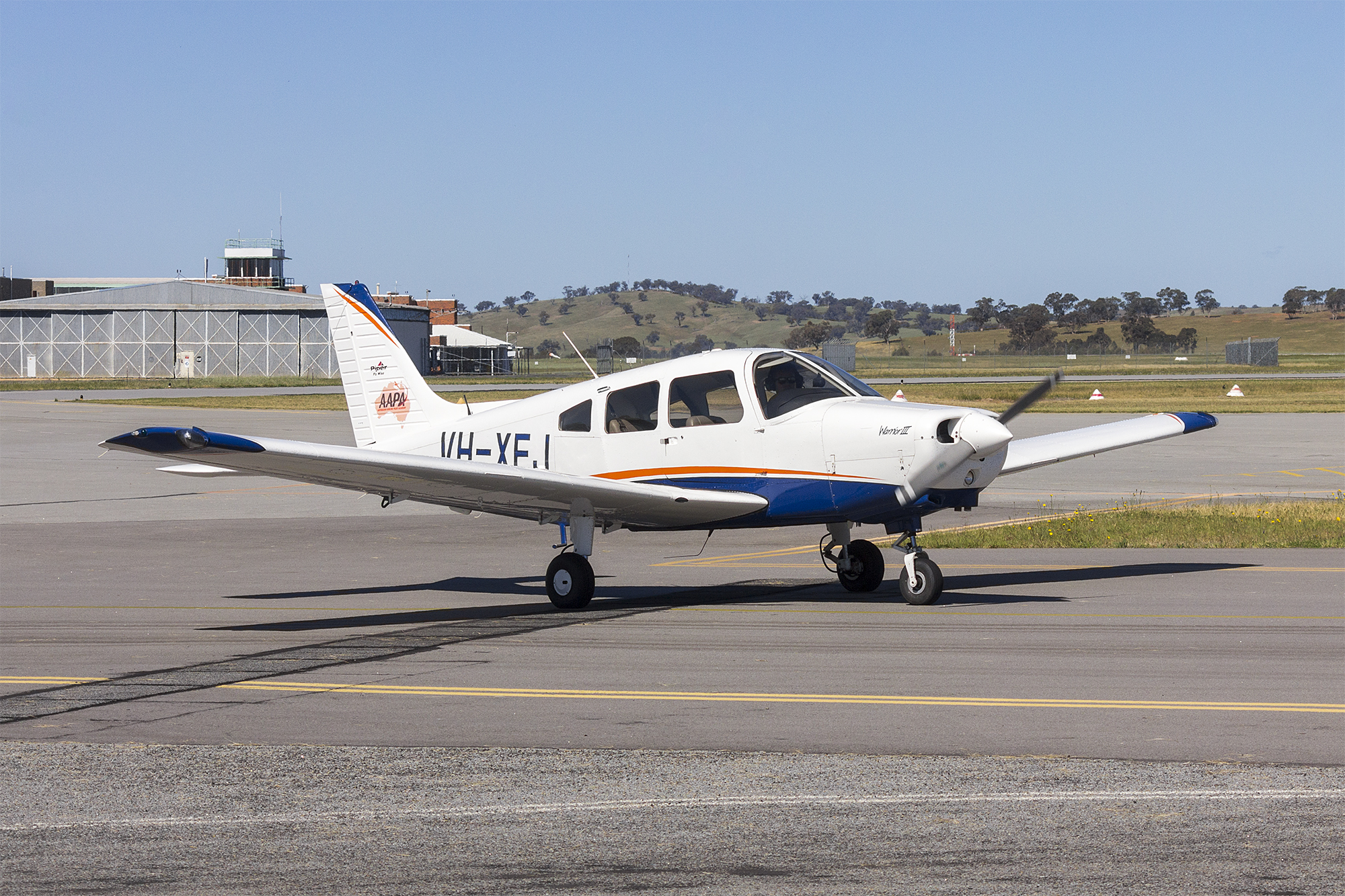
Australian Airline Pilot Academy Piper PA-28-161 Warrior III at Wagga Wagga

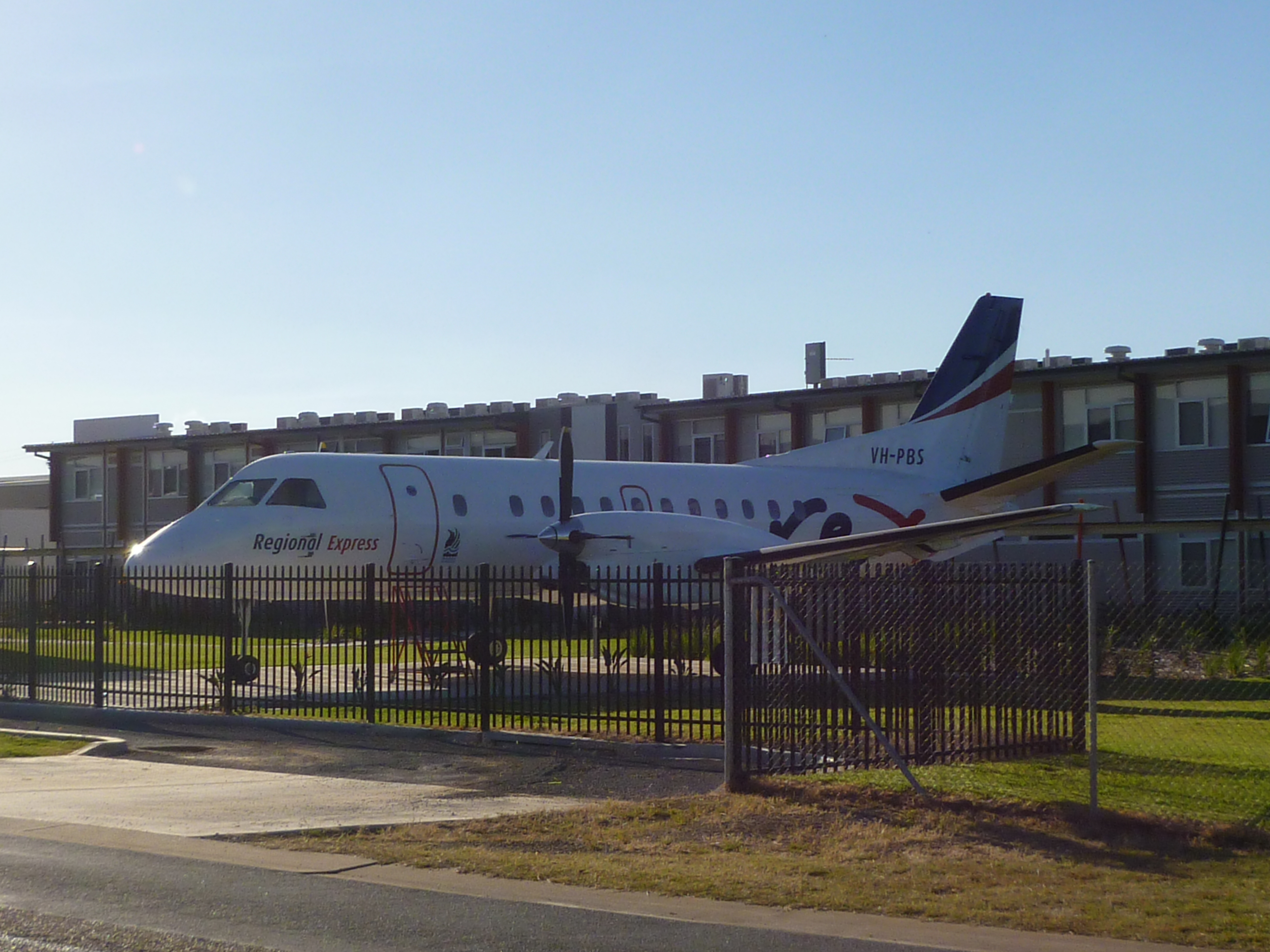
Retired Rex Saab 340B at the Australian Airline Pilot Academy, Wagga Wagga

In November 2007, Regional Express Airlines and Mangalore Airport Pty Limited created a joint venture pilot academy called the Civil Aviation Training Academy, based at Mangalore Airport in Victoria. In April 2008, Regional Express Airlines fully acquired the Civil Aviation Training Academy and it was renamed to Australian Airline Pilot Academy.

On 18 February 2009, Regional Express Airlines announced that the Australian Airline Pilot Academy (AAPA) would be relocated from Mangalore Airport to Wagga Wagga Airport in partnership with the City of Wagga Wagga starting in April 2009.

On 27 May 2010, the AAPA campus at Wagga Wagga Airport was officially opened by Federal Minister for Infrastructure, Transport, Regional Development and Local Government, Anthony Albanese.

On 19 November 2019, AAPA purchased ST Aerospace Academy Australia at Ballarat Airport in Victoria, taking it over as a second campus.

In addition to training aircraft, the flight school has five flight simulators, including a full motion Saab 340 simulator. There is also one retired Saab 340B at Wagga Wagga used as a training aid.

On 3 November 2024, it was confirmed that AAPA was up for sale after Rex Airlines went into administration in July 2024. It was reported that there was interest from over 40 parties based both domestically and internationally.

=== Training fleet ===
As of December 2021, the Australian Airline Pilot Academy operates the following aircraft:

Australian Airline Pilot Academy
Aircraft	In service	Location
Cessna 152	1	Ballarat
Cessna 172S	14	Ballarat
Piper PA-28 Warrior	16	Wagga Wagga
Piper PA-44 Seminole	10	Ballarat and Wagga Wagga
Beechcraft King Air C90GTi	1	Ballarat
Beechcraft Super King Air B200	1	Wagga Wagga

== See also ==
- List of airlines of Australia

== Bibliography ==
- Thorn, Jim. "Interview – Michael Jones, CEO Regional Express". Australian Aviation magazine, No. 187, September 2002, pp. 30–34. Aerospace Publications Pty. Ltd. ISSN 0813-0876
