= Kendell Airlines =

Regional airline of Australia (1967–2001)

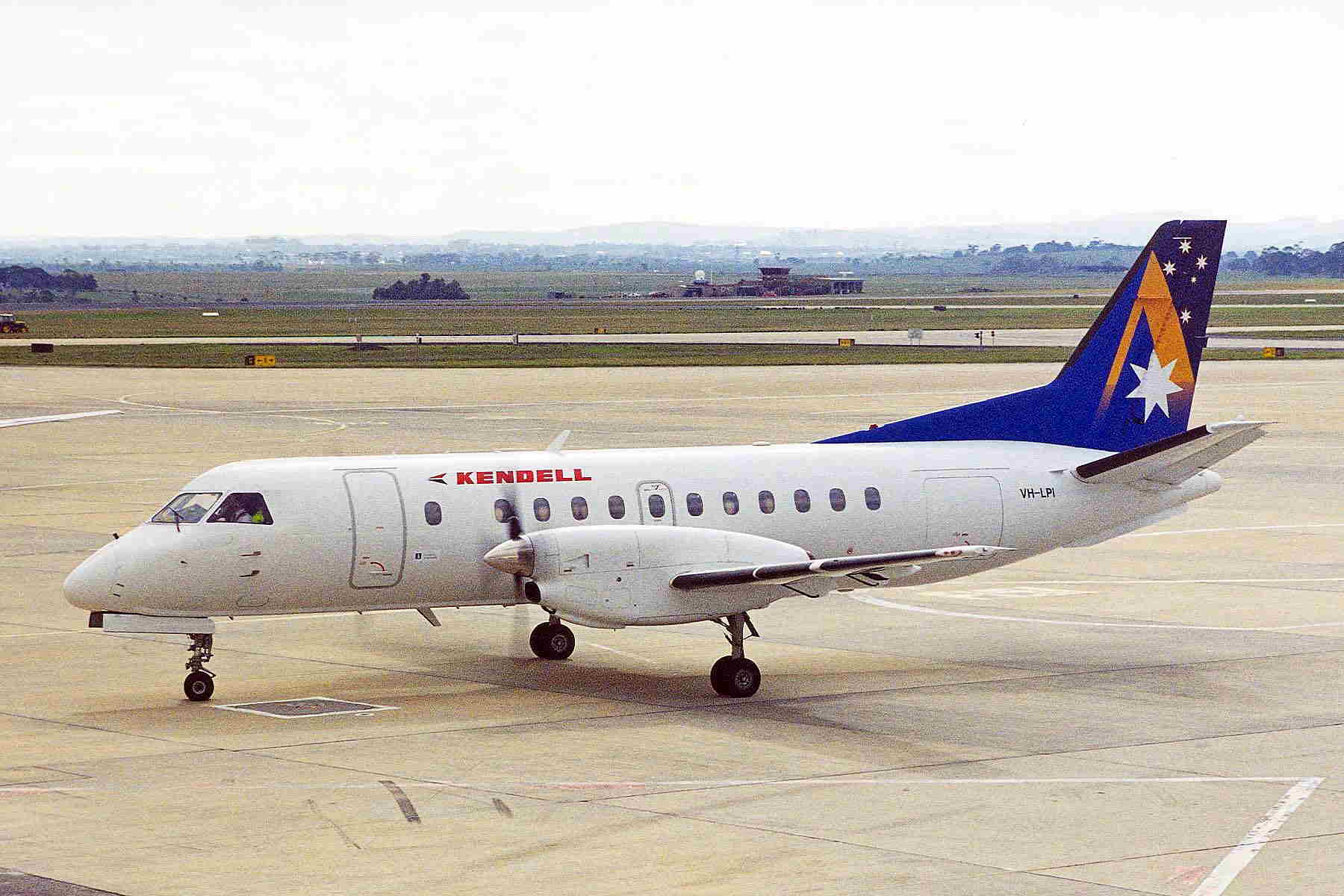
- Kendell Airlines Saab 340 operating under the Ansett Australia brand at Melbourne Airport
IATA	ICAO	Call sign
KD	KDA	KENDELL
- Founded: 1967
- Ceased operations: 31 August 2002 (merged with Hazelton Airlines to form Rex Airlines)
- Operating bases: Adelaide; Albury; Devonport; Sydney; Wagga Wagga
- Alliance: Star Alliance (affiliate)
- Destinations: See below
- Parent company: Ansett Transport Industries
- Headquarters: Wagga Wagga, New South Wales, Australia
- Founder: Don Kendell
- Website: www.kendell.com.au

Kendell Airlines was a regional airline of Australia, in the 1990s the largest in the country. It served major regional centres in New South Wales, Victoria, South Australia and Tasmania from Sydney, Melbourne and Adelaide. Many of its services were in co-operation with its sister company Ansett Australia from the 1990s.

== History ==
Original Kendell Airlines logo

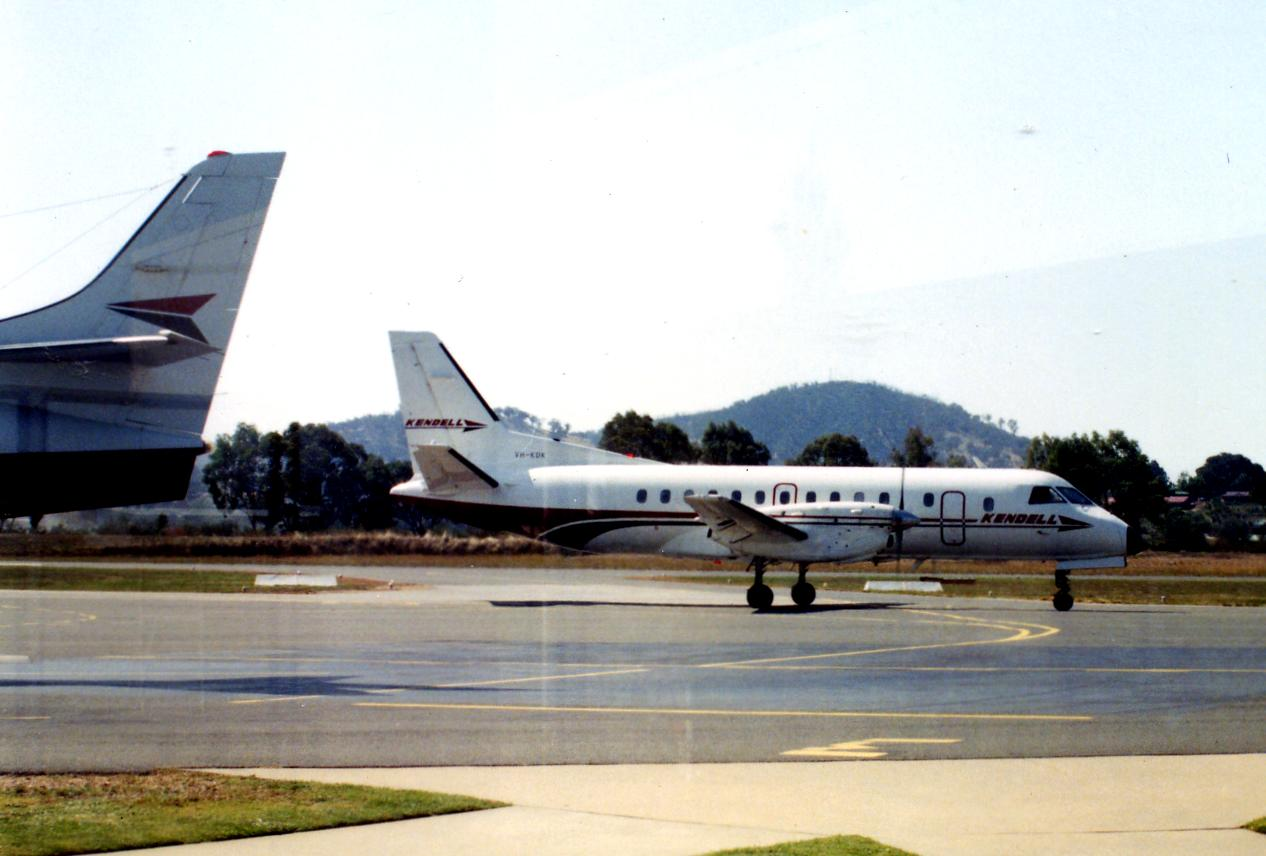
Kendell Airlines' first Saab 340A (registered VH-KDK) at Albury Airport in 1991

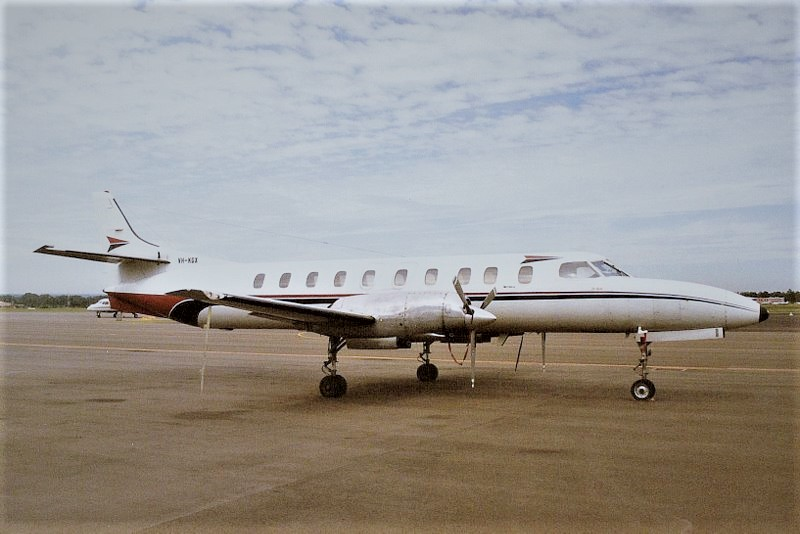
Metro II formerly operated by Kendell Airlines and still wearing its 1970s-era colour scheme, the red was replaced with blue

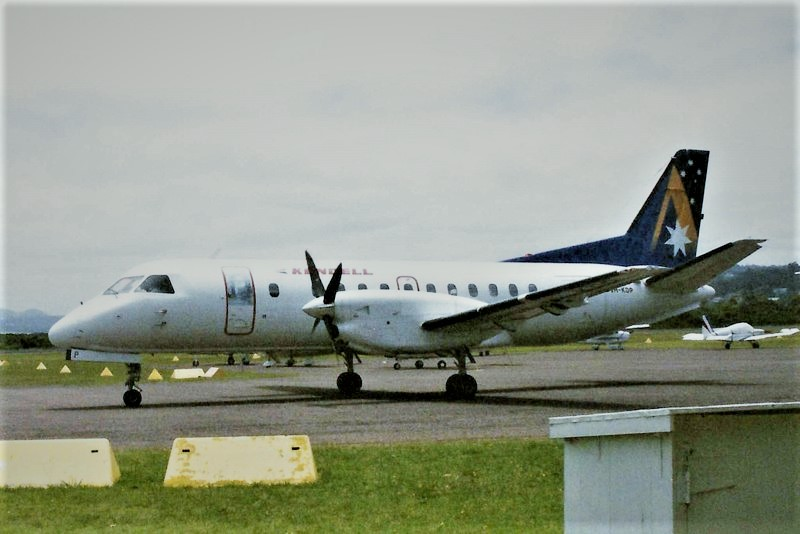
Kendell Airlines' second Saab 340A VH-KDP in the colour scheme adopted after the takeover by Ansett

Kendell Airlines was founded in 1967 as Premiair Aviation by aviation enthusiast Don Kendell and partners, originally serving as an air charter provider and flying school, based in Wagga Wagga. In 1971, it was renamed Kendell Airlines, which coincided with the launch of scheduled services using Piper PA-31 Navajo aircraft between Wagga Wagga and Melbourne, a route which had previously been operated by Ansett Australia. Shortly afterwards, the route network was expanded with flights to Sydney and Canberra.

Flight operations saw a further increase when de Havilland DH.114 Heron and Swearingen Metro II aircraft were added to the fleet, the former in 1974 and the latter in May 1979 following the Second Oil Crisis. The De Havilland DH.114 Heron aircraft were introduced on additional new routes including to Merimbula and Cooma in New South Wales. On 25 February 1985 the airline introduced the 34-seat Saab 340, a more modern regional airliner; Kendell was the first airline in the southern hemisphere to operate the Saab 340, with further aircraft of that type being added over the following years. The route network was nearly doubled in early 1986 when the South Australian routes of Airlines of South Australia (which was owned by Ansett) were taken over as a consequence of the deregulation of the Australian airline market. During the 1990s, Kendell established further operating bases to add to its original one at Wagga Wagga Airport, namely at Devonport Airport, Albury Airport and Sydney Airport, which was due to the airline becoming a subsidiary of Ansett.

From March 1996, Kendell Airlines offered the Capital Shuttle, a high-frequency (up to 13 daily return flights) service between Sydney and Canberra, on behalf of Ansett, which was followed by scheduled flights to Coffs Harbour and Ballina, which also had previously been operated by Ansett. The Saab 340s that were acquired by Kendell Airlines during that period were painted in Ansett colors. In 1999, Kendell became a regional affiliate of the Star Alliance, of which Ansett Australia had become a member.

Between 1999 and 2001, Kendell Airlines took delivery of 1w Bombardier CRJ200 regional jets, the first jet aircraft to be operated by the airline. On 14 September 2001 parent company Ansett collapsed with Kendell Airlines placed into administration, but continuing to operate a limited schedule, and also filled a temporary void left by Ansett Australia by flying on the Sydney–Canberra–Melbourne and Melbourne–Mount Gambier–Adelaide routes. Following the collapse of Ansett in September 2001, Kendell was acquired by the Australiawide Airlines in July 2002 and merged with fellow Ansett subsidiary Hazelton Airlines to form Regional Express on 1 August 2002.

== Destinations ==
As at February 2002, Kendell Airlines operated to these destinations:

- Adelaide
- Albury
- Broken Hill
- Burnie
- Canberra
- Ceduna
- Coober Pedy
- Devonport
- King Island
- Kingscote
- Melbourne
- Merimbula
- Mildura
- Mount Gambier
- Olympic Dam
- Portland
- Port Lincoln
- Wagga Wagga
- Whyalla

== Fleet ==
Over the years, Kendell Airlines operated the following aircraft types:

Aircraft	Introduced	Retired
Bombardier CRJ200	1999	2001
de Havilland DH.114 Heron	1974	1980–81
Fairchild Swearingen Metroliner	1979	
Saab 340	1985	2001
Piper PA-31 Navajo	1971	

== Accidents and incidents ==
- On 1 July 1992, a Kendell Airlines, SAAB 340A, VH-EKT, on a scheduled passenger service from Moorabbin to Devonport with 17 passengers and 3 crew lost directional control on landing. The aircraft departed the runway and ran through a ditch in soft muddy ground. Substantial damage was sustained to the aircraft but there were no injuries to passengers or crew. The cause, a severe asymmetric thrust condition developed after landing when reverse thrust was selected but the right propeller remained at a positive blade angle. This was due to the right propeller control unit being defective from an internal oil leakage across the feathering solenoid valve. The aircraft was repaired and returned to service. It still flies today.
- On 11 November 1998, a Kendell Airlines SAAB 340A, VH-LPI went into a stall with the two pilots losing control for around 10 seconds, due to icing of the aircraft that was experienced near Lake Eildon on a scheduled flight from Albury to Melbourne. The solitary flight attendant received a minor injury when the aircraft descended 2,300 feet (approximately 700 metres) during the loss of control and subsequent recovery. None of the 28 passengers were injured and the flight continued to Melbourne Airport.
