= Carnarvon Airport (Western Australia) =

Airport in Western Australia

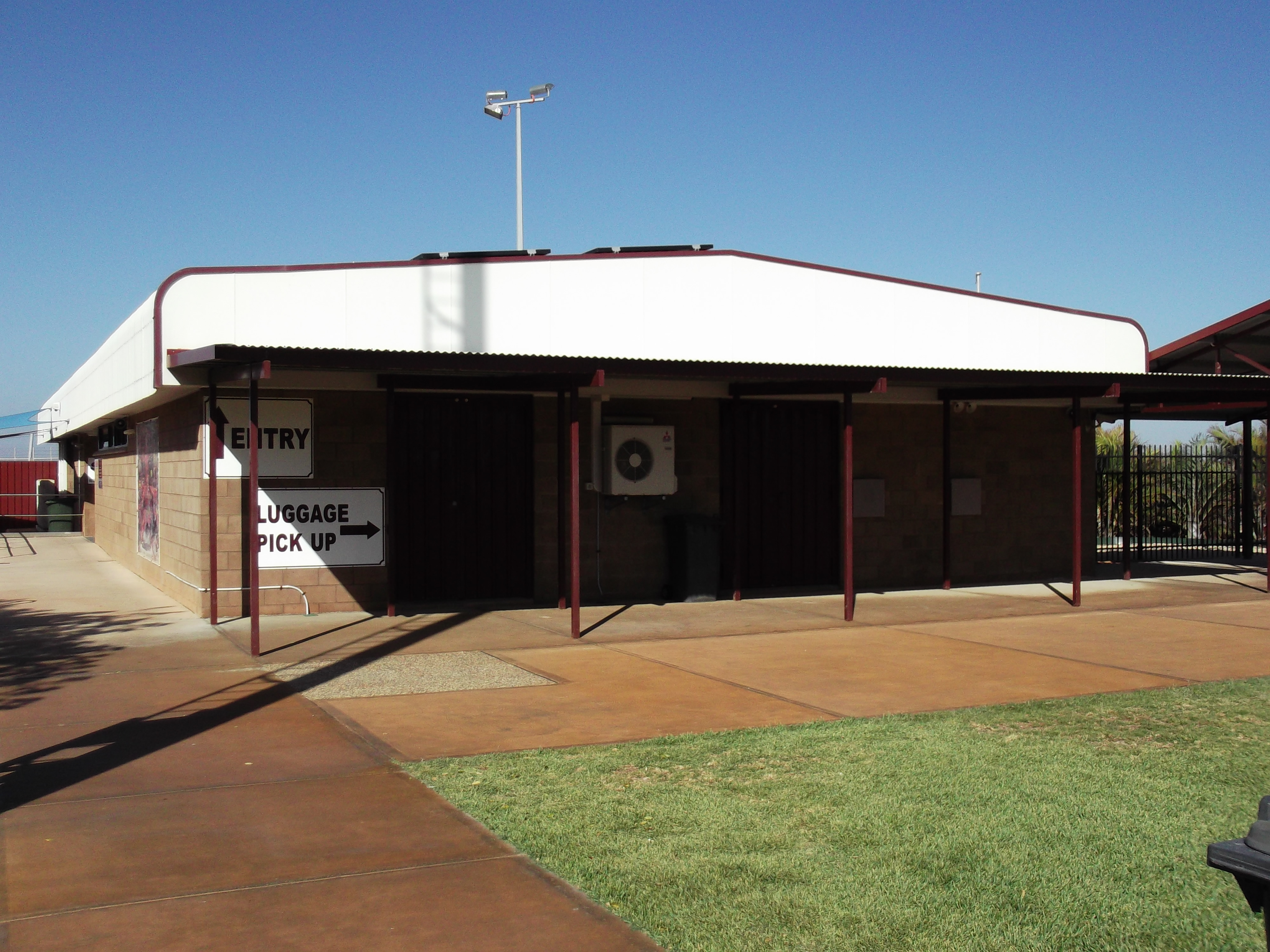
- Regional Express Airlines passenger terminal
- IATA: CVQ; ICAO: YCAR

Summary
- Airport type: Public
- Owner: N/A
- Operator: Shire of Carnarvon
- Serves: Carnarvon, Western Australia
- Location: Carnarvon, Western Australia
- Elevation AMSL: 13 ft / 4 m
- Coordinates: 24°52′50″S 113°40′20″E
- Website: www.carnarvon.wa.gov.au/Carnarvon-Airport

Map
- Location in Western Australia

Runways
| Direction | Length | | Surface |
| Direction | m | ft | Surface |
|---|---|---|---|
| 04/22 | 1,679 | 5,509 | Asphalt |
| 18/36 | 1,140 | 3,740 | Asphalt |
- Sources: Australian AIP and aerodrome chart

Carnarvon Airport (IATA: CVQ, ICAO: YCAR) is an airport at Carnarvon, Western Australia. The airport is publicly owned, meaning that the local government, Shire of Carnarvon, controls it.

== Airlines and destinations ==
| Airlines | Destinations |
|---|---|
| Rex Airlines | Monkey Mia, Perth |
| National Jet Express (Operated by Rex Airlines using Q400 aircraft) | Perth |

== Demand ==
Demand on the route is seasonal with it peaking during the summer season, although generally it is a low traffic route, which shares a flight from Perth to Shark Bay as a stop before departing for Carnarvon. Due to increased demand Rex Airlines charters the use of National Jet Express Q400s on Mondays, Wednesdays, and Fridays to manage the demand, rather than using their own Saab 340 aircraft which have lower capacity.

== Former Airlines ==
The following airlines have served this airport in the past:

- Virgin Australia Regional Airlines (formerly known as Skywest)
- Skippers Aviation
- Ansett

== See also ==
- List of airports in Western Australia
- Aviation transport in Australia
