= Cunnamulla Airport =

- IATA: CMA; ICAO: YCMU

Summary
- Airport type: Public
- Operator: Paroo Shire Council
- Location: Cunnamulla, Queensland
- Elevation AMSL: 630 ft / 192 m
- Coordinates: 28°01′48″S 145°37′20″E

Map
- Location in Queensland

Runways
Direction	Length		Surface
Direction	m	ft	Surface
12/30	1,733	5,686	Asphalt
06/24	914	2,999	Asphalt
- Sources: Australian AIP and aerodrome chart

Cunnamulla Airport (IATA: CMA, ICAO: YCMU) is an airport in Cunnamulla, Queensland, Australia. The airport is 4 nautical miles (7.4 km; 4.6 mi) west northwest from the town.

== 1970 Royal Tour ==
In April 1970 Princess Anne was scheduled to visit Cunamulla during a Royal Tour. Local authorities decided the derelict Miles M.65 Gemini at the airport had to be moved out of sight. A rope was attached to the tailwheel and a tractor pulled from the front, with the expectation that the inverted aircraft would be pulled over on to its undercarriage legs. However the deteriorated wooden fuselage was crushed and broke up. The wreck was moved out of sight on the airport.

== Airlines and destinations ==
Airlines	Destinations
Rex Airlines	Brisbane, St George, Thargomindah, Toowoomba

Services are operated under contract to the Government of Queensland. Previously operated by Skytrans, services have been operated by Regional Express Airlines since 1 January 2015.

== See also ==
- List of airports in Queensland
