= St George Airport (Queensland) =

Airport in Queensland, Australia

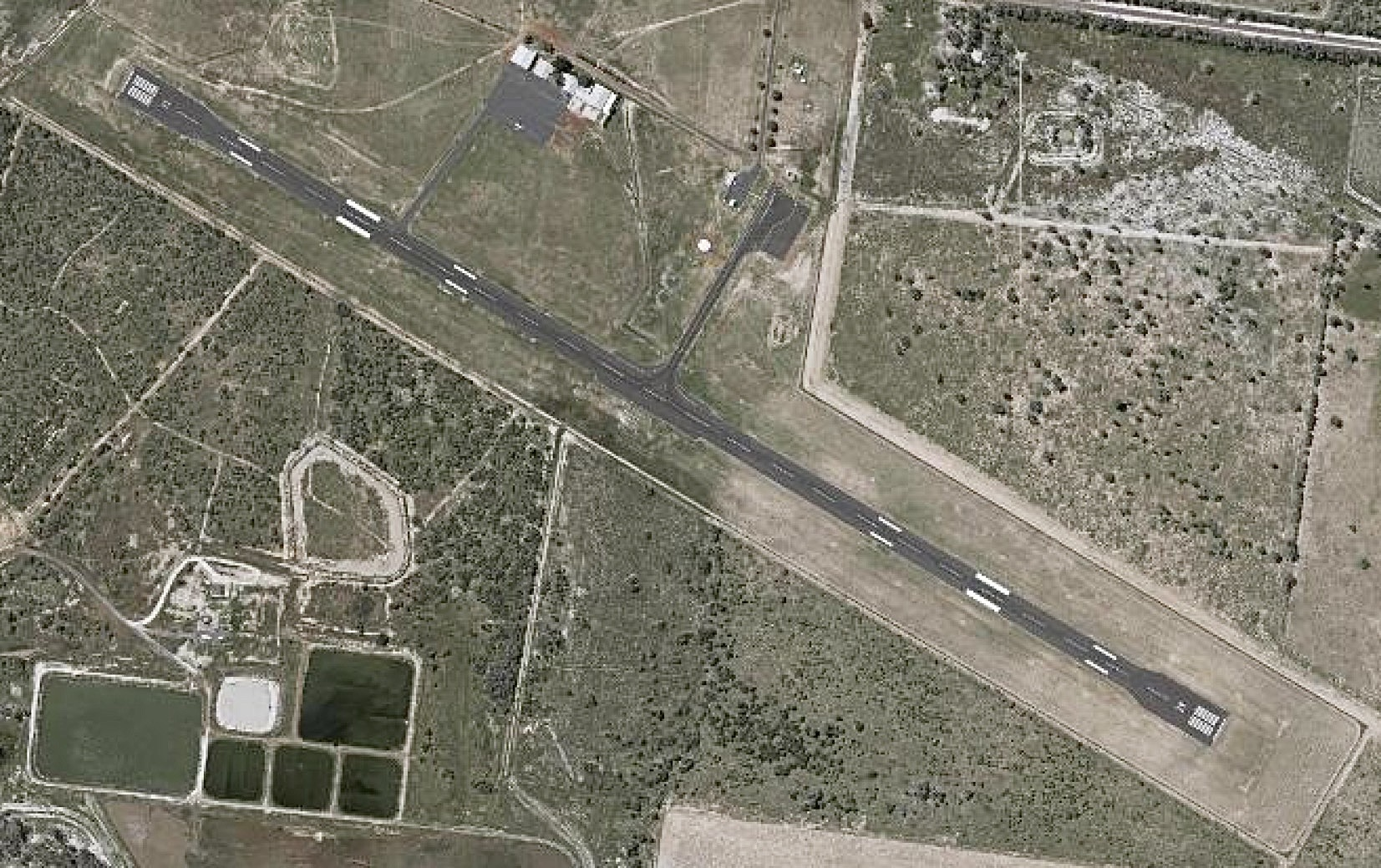
- Aerial view of St George Airport captured on 9 October 2016.
- IATA: SGO; ICAO: YSGE

Summary
- Airport type: Public
- Operator: Balonne Shire Council
- Location: St George, Queensland
- Elevation AMSL: 656 ft (200 m)
- Coordinates: 28°03′00″S 148°35′42″E

Map
- Location in Queensland

Runways
Direction	Length		Surface
Direction	m	ft	Surface
11/29	1,520	4,987	Asphalt
- Sources: Australian AIP and aerodrome chart

St George Airport (IATA: SGO, ICAO: YSGE) is an airport 1 nautical mile (1.9 km; 1.2 mi) southeast of St George, Queensland, Australia. An airfield at St George was established after the council applied for an aerodrome license using a portion of the local racecourse. However, the aerodrome would soon become unfit for the growing aviation needs and it was refurbished in 1939. In 1953, an all-weather runway was constructed following years of fair-weather operations causing several closures due to rain.

== History ==
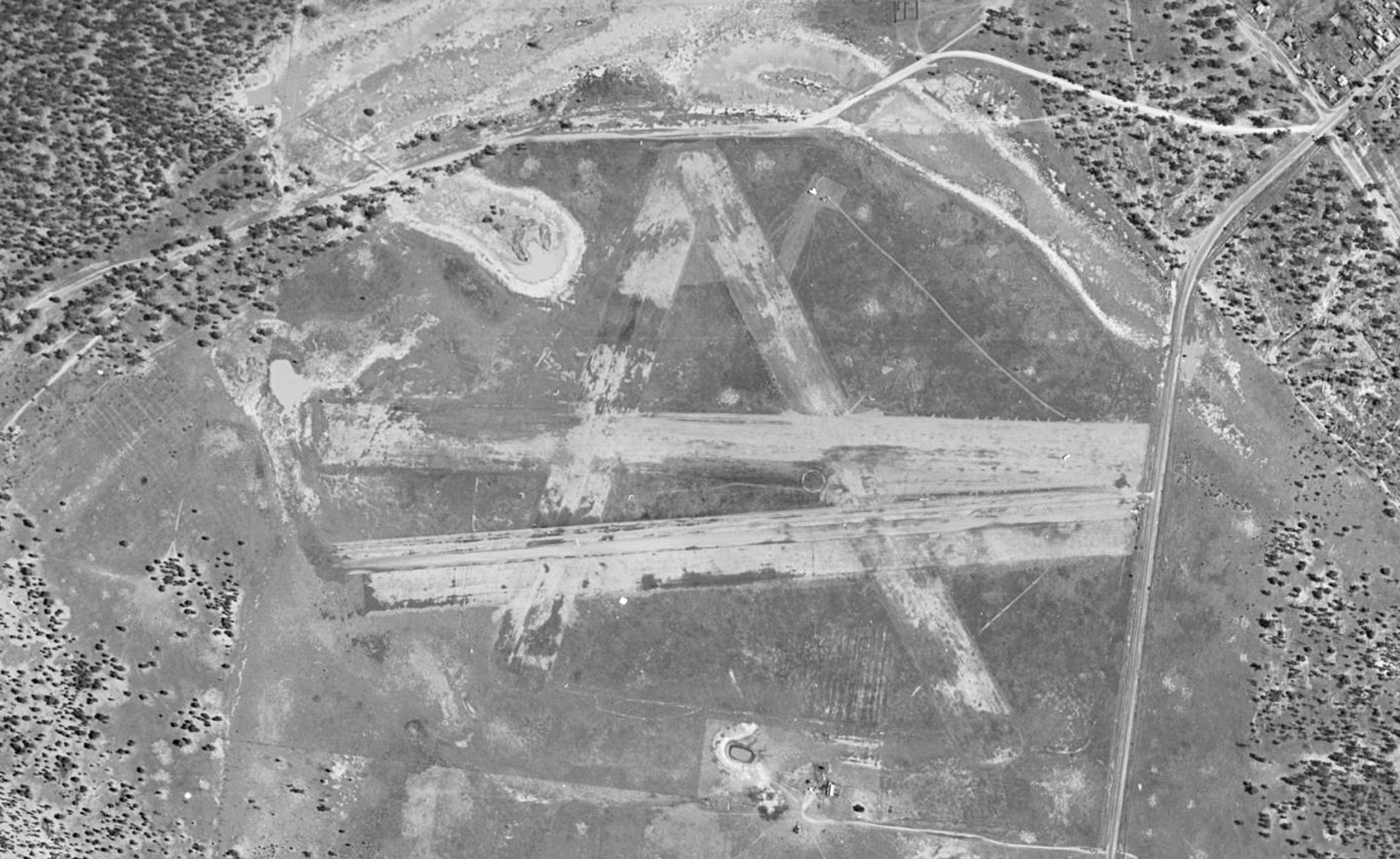
Aerial view of St. George Airport in Queensland, taken in 30 June 1950.

On 29 March 1933, the Balonne Shire Council applied for an aerodrome license for a portion of the St. George racecourse. In July 1938, aerodrome inspector G. D. Vines found that the aerodrome's graded runways were too thin, in the wrong direction, and covered in potholes. As a result, a new site was surveyed for the development of a replacement aerodrome. However, the council rather opted to regrade the runways. On 24 September 1938, plans were submitted by shire engineer A. M. Anderson, proposing four runways measuring 100 feet wide and the shortest of which measuring 980 yards long. In October 1938, construction of the new aerodrome went ahead and telephone lines in the proposed landing ground were subsequently removed. On 21 October 1939, the Main Roads Fund awarded a £1000 grant for the construction of the aerodrome, which covered half the estimated the cost.

On 18 July 1940, the Department of Civil Aviation assigned the aerodrome an "A" classification. By 1945, four emergency airstrips were prepared between St George and Bollon, located 108 kilometres east from the aerodrome. On 26 November 1948, Inland Airways opened a weekly service to Brisbane with its Lockheed Lodestars. The service took place every Friday, having a flight time of 1 hour and 40 minute long. On 30 November 1948, the first Douglas aircraft landed at the aerodrome. On 27 April 1953, the new all-weather runway was opened.

== Airlines and destinations ==
Airlines	Destinations
Rex Airlines	Brisbane, Cunnamulla, Thargomindah, Toowoomba

Services are operated under contract to the Government of Queensland and have been operated by Regional Express Airlines since 1 January 2015.

== Accidents & incidents ==
- On 10 February 1936, a Westland Widgeon piloted by Dick Hall was carried by powerful gusts of wind, hitting a racecourse fence. One wing was crumpled, the rudder broke off, and the fuselage was substantially damaged. The pilot was unharmed, and the aircraft was towed into town awaiting repairs from a mechanic based in Sydney.

== See also ==
- List of airports in Queensland
