= Ceduna Airport =

Airport in Ceduna, South Australia

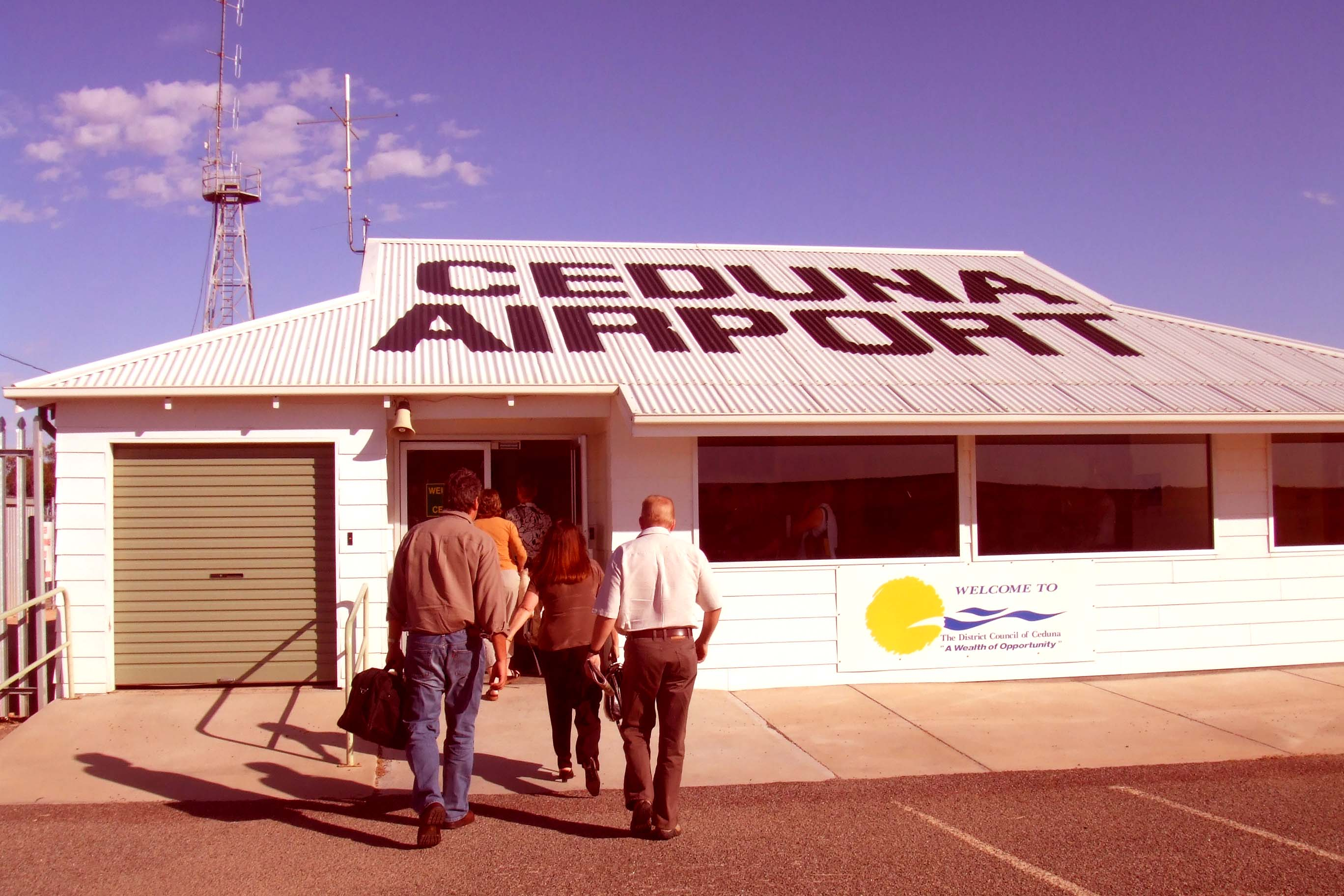
- IATA: CED; ICAO: YCDU

Summary
- Airport type: Public
- Operator: District Council of Ceduna
- Location: Ceduna
- Elevation AMSL: 77 ft / 23 m
- Coordinates: 32°07′50″S 133°42′35″E

Map
- Location in South Australia

Runways
Direction	Length		Surface
Direction	ft	m	Surface
11/29	5,708	1,740	Asphalt
17/35	3,326	1,014	Gravel

Statistics (2016)
- Passengers: 22,000
- Sources: Australian AIP and aerodrome chart Australian Airports Association

Ceduna Airport (IATA: CED, ICAO: YCDU) is a public airport in Ceduna, South Australia. The airport, which is owned by the District Council of Ceduna is located adjacent to the Eyre Highway, approximately 2 km (1.2 mi) east of the town. It is the westernmost airport that receives regular passenger service in South Australia and is critical infrastructure for the surrounding remote and sparsely populated region. In addition to scheduled flights to Adelaide, the airport caters to charters in support of the mining industry, general aviation, the Royal Flying Doctor Service, aerial firefighting and occasional military use.

== History ==
An aerodrome was first established at Ceduna by the Civil Aviation Branch in 1928, ahead of the commencement of a transcontinental airmail service between Adelaide and Perth by West Australian Airways.

The first flight arrived in May 1929, with regular services established in June of the same year. It was cited as an important stopping point on the air route in 1934.

The Department of Civil Aviation recognised Ceduna's importance as an intermediate landing ground on an inter-capital air route, in 1939 announcing plans to install lighting to allow emergency landings at night and radio direction finding equipment at the aerodrome. During World War II, the Royal Australian Air Force used Ceduna as a staging base for moving aircraft between the East and West coast. Ceduna was a focus for missionary work, with the Bush Church Aid Society supporting their local health care facilities with an aviation operation based out of the airport between 1938 and the 1960s. Flying Doctor Freda Evelyn Gibson and writer Macarthur Job began their careers from this base.

In 1950, the Department of Civil Aviation acquired land around the airport, and the current terminal facilities were constructed in 1951. The airport's national importance declined as airlines introduced more capable aircraft that could fly between Adelaide and Perth non-stop. Scheduled services connecting to Adelaide were maintained by Airlines of South Australia from the 1960s through to the 1980s and later by Kendell Airlines, although these did not always operate directly. Ownership of the airport was transferred to the local council in 1991.

In 2003, Rex Airlines introduced Saab 340 aircraft on the Adelaide-Ceduna route which had previously been operated by smaller Metroliners. This increase in capacity saw the number of passengers using the airport increase from around 10,000 per year to over 25,000 in 2009–10. By 2013, Rex were operating 12 services per week on the route. The apron was expanded to better accommodate simultaneous handling of these larger aircraft in 2015. In 2020, despite daily flights being reduced to just two per week as a result of COVID-19 travel restrictions, the council committed to a modest expansion of the terminal building to enlarge the drop off and departures areas, as well as an undercover baggage claim area and new restroom facilities.

== Airport facilities and operations ==
Similar to much of the Eyre Highway's alignment close to the Great Australian Bight, Ceduna Airport occasionally experiences issues with fog. The main runway, 11/29 is 1,740 m (5,710 ft) long by 30 m (98 ft) wide. This code 3C runway is equipped with pilot-operated lighting for night operations and can handle aircraft up to the size of a Boeing 737 with some restrictions. A secondary gravel runway, 17/35 is 1,014 m (3,327 ft) long and only suitable for aircraft under 5,700 kg (12,600 lb) maximum takeoff weight, however the council has identified potential extension and surfacing of this runway should expansion be required to accommodate regular operation by larger aircraft due to prevailing winds and approach paths that avoid overflying the town. As an uncontrolled airport with a typically a low volume of traffic, pilots are required to communicate via a Common Traffic Advisory Frequency (CTAF) to safely co-ordinate arrivals and departures. A Non-Directional Beacon (NDB) navigation aid remained in operation at the airport as of March 2023.

The small passenger terminal, apron and general aviation parking are located on the northeastern side of the airport with direct access to the Eyre Highway. Both Avgas and Jet A fuel are available in the precinct. The Bureau of Meteorology maintains an office and weather radar facility on airport land, south of the main runway.

== Airlines and destinations ==
Airlines	Destinations
Rex Airlines	Adelaide
Pel-Air	Charter: Jacinth-Ambrosia Mine

== Accidents and incidents ==
- On 17 January 1942, a Lockheed Hudson operated by No. 14 Squadron Royal Australian Air Force crashed shortly after takeoff. The aircraft was one of four en route to RAAF Base Pearce that had landed to refuel in Ceduna. All six crew on board were killed in the accident. A subsequent board of inquiry did not publicly comment on the cause of the crash. A small memorial beside the Eyre Highway next to the airport was built in 2006, listing the names of those who died.
- On 14 January 1962 James Knight took off from Ceduna Airport in CAC Wackett VH-BEC to fly to Cook, approximately 200 nautical miles WNW on the Trans-Australian railway line. The aircraft never arrived in Cook and Knight was never seen again despite a comprehensive air, land and sea search conducted over 19 days. For 3 years the whereabouts of VH-BEC was unknown. On 28 March 1965 the crew of an aerial survey aircraft sighted a small aircraft between sand dunes in the desert approximately 200 nautical miles north of Cook. It proved to be VH-BEC. An expedition from Emu Field reached the aircraft on 6 April but Knight’s body has never been found. It was discovered that the magnetic compass in the front cockpit of the aircraft had become loose in its mounting and was misaligned by about 30 degrees. VH-BEC was retrieved from the desert in 1973 and is now on display in Alice Springs at the Central Australian Aviation Museum.

== See also ==
- List of airports in South Australia
