= Merimbula Airport =

- IATA: MIM; ICAO: YMER

Summary
- Airport type: Public
- Operator: Bega Valley Shire Council
- Serves: Merimbula, New South Wales, Australia
- Elevation AMSL: 7 ft / 2 m
- Coordinates: 36°54′31″S 149°54′05″E
- Website: Bega Valley City Council: Airport

Map
- Location in New South Wales

Runways
Direction	Length		Surface
Direction	m	ft	Surface
03/21	1,602	5,256	Asphalt
- Sources: Australian AIP and aerodrome chart

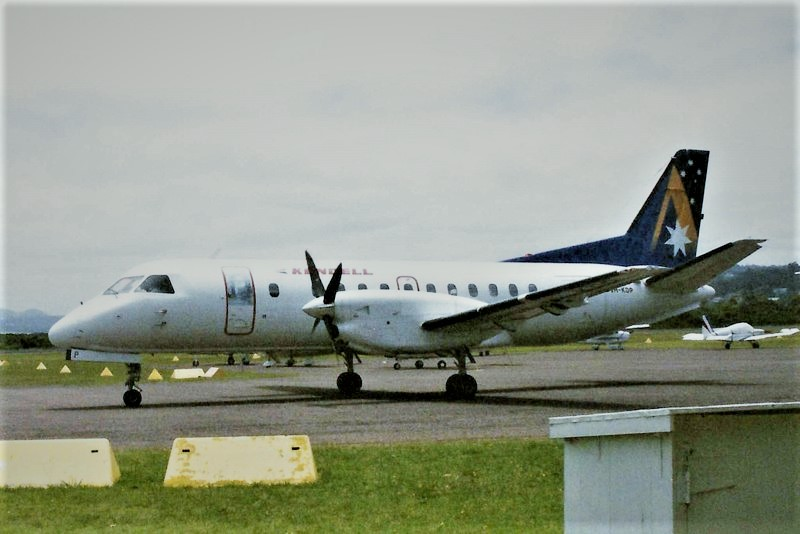
A Saab 340A operated by Kendell Airlines at Merimbula Airport, 1998

Merimbula Airport (IATA: MIM, ICAO: YMER) is an airport serving Merimbula, New South Wales, Australia. It is located 1 nautical mile (2 km; 1 mi) south of Merimbula and is owned and operated by Bega Valley Shire Council.

== Facilities ==
The airport is at an elevation of 7 ft (2 m) above mean sea level. It has one runway designated 03/21 with an asphalt surface measuring 1,602 m × 30 m (5,256 ft × 98 ft). This runway is equipped with night lighting and precision approach path indicators. The airport receives a low volume of traffic and pilots are required to communicate via a Common Traffic Advisory Frequency (CTAF) to safely co-ordinate arrivals and departures. Both Avgas and Jet A1 fuel is available. A Non-Directional Beacon (NDB) is located at the southwestern end of the airfield.

In 2019, a $4.4 million upgrade of the small terminal facility was completed, providing new arrivals, security screening and baggage handling areas, as well as additional car parking. This was followed by upgrades to the runway to allow operation of large turboprops like the Q400 and ATR 72 which were completed in early 2022.

== Airlines and destinations ==
Airlines	Destinations
QantasLink	Sydney; Seasonal: Melbourne
Rex Airlines	Melbourne, Moruya, Sydney

== Statistics ==
Merimbula Airport was ranked 59th in Australia for the number of revenue passengers served in financial year 2010–2011.

Annual passenger and aircraft statistics for Merimbula Airport
Year	Revenue passengers	Aircraft movements
2001-02	20,194	2,281
2002-03	22,057	2,633
2003-04	34,794	2,664
2004-05	49,234	2,754
2005-06	57,732	3,004
2006-07	64,881	2,956
2007-08	63,904	2,912
2008-09	54,718	2,811
2009-10	52,210	2,791
2010-11	51,299	2,889

== In popular culture ==
Electronic dance music duo Flight Facilities take their name from a company founded by band-member Hugo Gruzman's grandfather in the 1960s, based at Merimbula Airport.

== See also ==
- List of airports in New South Wales
