= Thargomindah Airport =

Airport in Queensland, Australia

- IATA: XTG; ICAO: YTGM

Summary
- Airport type: Public
- Operator: Bulloo Shire Council
- Location: Thargomindah, Queensland
- Elevation AMSL: 433 ft / 132 m
- Coordinates: 27°59′11″S 143°48′39″E

Map
- Location in Queensland

Runways
Direction	Length		Surface
Direction	m	ft	Surface
04/22	846	2,776	Gravel/Soil
13/31	1,463	4,800	Asphalt
- Sources: Australian AIP and aerodrome chart

Thargomindah Airport (IATA: XTG, ICAO: YTGM) is an airport near Thargomindah, Queensland, Australia.

== Airlines and destinations ==
Airlines	Destinations
Rex Airlines	Brisbane, Cunnamulla, St George, Toowoomba

Services are operated by Regional Express Airlines under contract to the Government of Queensland.

== See also ==
- List of airports in Queensland
