= Don Kendell =

Australian businessman (1930–2001)

- Born: Donald Moreton Kendell; 19 January 1930; Geelong, Victoria, Australia
- Died: 14 October 2001 (aged 71); Wagga Wagga, New South Wales, Australia
- Occupation: Businessman
- Known for: Founder of Kendell Airlines
- Children: 4

Donald Moreton Kendell AM (19 January 1930 – 14 October 2001) was an Australian businessman who was the founder and chairman of Kendell Airlines, which, in the 1990s, was Australia's largest regional airline.

== Biography ==
Kendell grew up on his parents' wheat and sheep property in south western New South Wales, where he became fascinated by aviation. He recalled that as a seven-year-old he ran barefoot for nearly a mile through paddocks full of Saffron Thistle just to watch a biplane take off.

He attended Geelong College after a period at Osborne Bush School but returned to his parents' property near Lockhart, New South Wales, to help during a drought in 1946. But the flying bug was strong and in 1949 at the age of 19, Kendell took flying lessons in Wagga Wagga and soon obtained his licence.

After a period in the Citizens Air Force, successful barnstorming trips around western Victoria flying Tiger Moths and a round Australia odyssey looking for flying work, he set off for England in 1955.

There he obtained a commercial pilot's licence and started working for British European Airways flying Herons, DC3s and later turboprop Viscounts. While in the United Kingdom he met and married Eilish Burke.

He returned to Australia and farming in 1959 but the aviation bug soon took hold again and in 1965 he and Eilish moved to Wagga Wagga to become partners in a small flying business.

After buying out their partners, they set up Premiair Aviation with two Piper Cherokee aircraft. The company was incorporated in 1967 and the name changed to Kendell Airlines in 1971.

Kendell Airlines was successful in a business notorious for a very high failure rate. Kendell became well-known in the airline industry. He remained firmly committed to regional Australia and resisted attempts to move the airlines head office from Wagga Wagga.

Kendell had a simple philosophy: Offer a reliable, frequent service at the best possible price. He believed that there is no room for sentiment in the airline business – if a route does not pay then you cease to operate it. It was a yardstick that stood him in good stead.

In 1992, Kendell was made a member of the Order of Australia (AM) in the Queen's Birthday Honours for his services to aviation. In 2001, he was awarded an Honorary Doctorate of Business from Charles Sturt University.

In June 1997, he retired as Kendell Airline's managing director but remained as the non-executive chairman for the airline including Ansett's two other subsidiaries, Aeropelican and Skywest Airlines, until 31 December 2000.

== Death ==
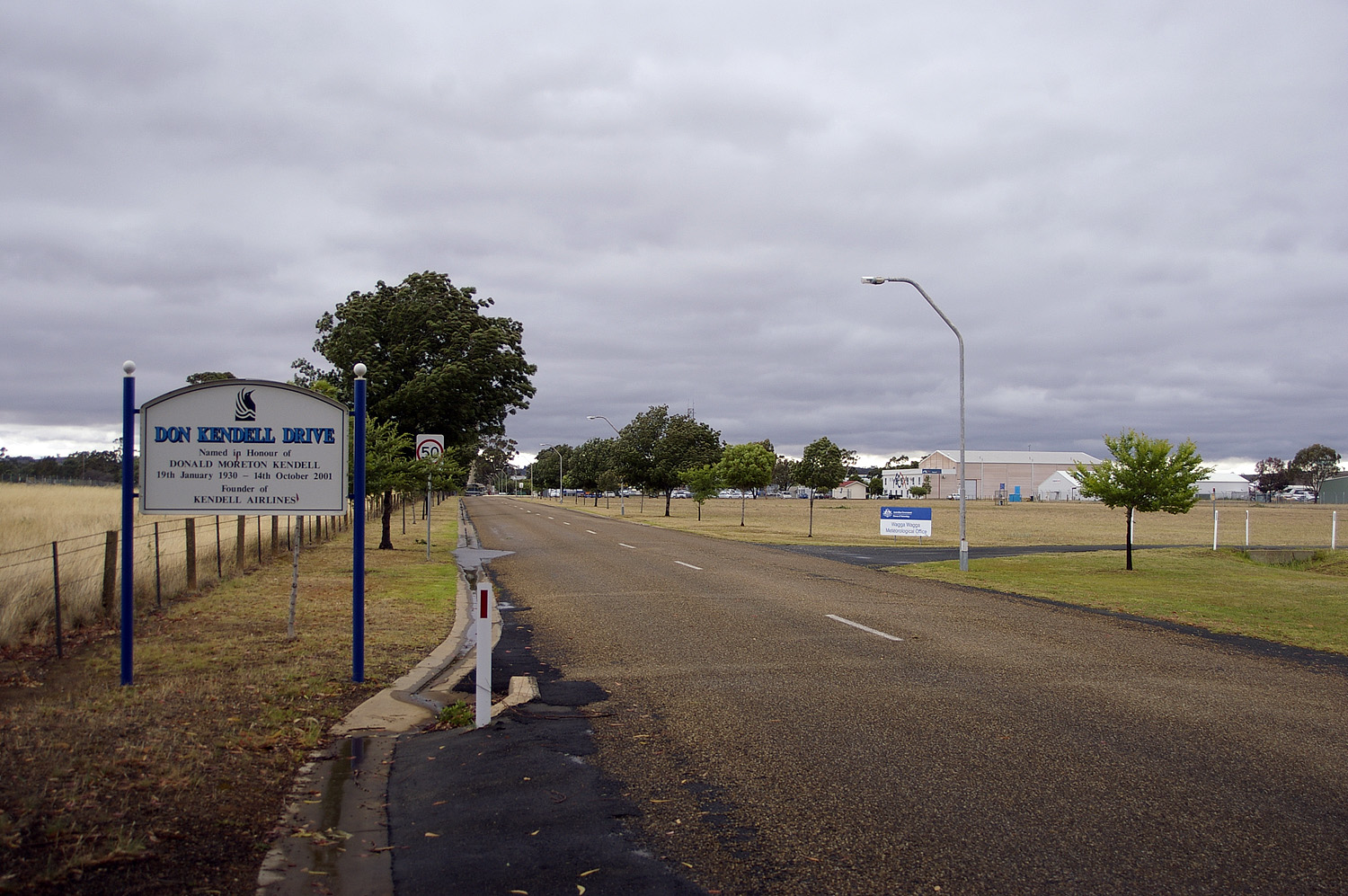
Don Kendell Drive at the Wagga Wagga Airport was named in honour of the Kendell Airlines founder

Kendell died of cancer on 14 October 2001, in Wagga Wagga, at the age of 71.

He was survived by his wife, two sons and two daughters, and grandchildren.
