= Moruya Airport =

- IATA: MYA; ICAO: YMRY

Summary
- Airport type: Public
- Operator: Eurobodalla Shire Council
- Location: Moruya, New South Wales
- Elevation AMSL: 17 ft (5.2 m)
- Coordinates: 35°53′52″S 150°08′40″E

Map
- Location in New South Wales

Runways
Direction	Length		Surface
Direction	m	ft	Surface
18/36	1,523	4,997	Asphalt
05/23	827	2,713	Bitumen
- Sources: Australian AIP and aerodrome chart

Moruya Airport (IATA: MYA, ICAO: YMRY) is an airport located 3.5 NM (6.5 km; 4.0 mi) northeast of Moruya, New South Wales, Australia, at the mouth of the Moruya River. It is one of two airports with regular passenger flights in the state's South Coast region, but also caters to general aviation and tourism operators, as well as emergency services.

== History ==
First licensed as an aerodrome in 1939, Moruya airport was acquiredby the Royal Australian Air Force (RAAF) as RAAF Base Moruya in 1942. Three runways were laid out adjacent to the mouth of the Moruya River. Moruya was home to No. 11 Operational Base Unit to provide support for RAAF aircraft utilising the airfield. With ownership transferred to the Department of Civil Aviation following the war, it was not until the 1960s that the airfield was upgraded with the installation of navigation aids and runway lights.

Between 2005-06 and 2010–11, the number of revenue passengers handled by the airport grew from 16,759 to 20,301.

=== 2019–20 bushfire emergency ===
During the 2019–20 bushfire emergency, the airport and adjacent river were a staging point for aerial firefighting efforts. In December 2019, a catastrophic bushfire cut road links, isolating the town. The resulting highway closures left Moruya Airport as a vital resource in the protection of the local region from the devastating bushfires.

== Operations ==
Moruya Airport is a regional hub for a variety of emergency services, providing vital services for the local region that otherwise would not exist without the airport. The Westpac Lifesaver Rescue Helicopter Service has maintained a base at Moruya Airport since 2010, providing a search and rescue service with specialist medical crews, while other aeromedical retrieval services including Toll Air Ambulance and the Royal Flying Doctor Service regularly visit the airport. During bushfire seasons, fleets of firefighting aircraft are stationed at Moruya Airport to aid in bushfire protection.

Passenger service is provided by Regional Express using Saab 340 turboprops several times a week to and from Sydney, with most inbound flights continuing to Merimbula to the south. The small terminal is located to the East of the runway, sharing a parking lot with a beachside camping ground.

Other operators include the Moruya Aero Club and a small flying school. A number of tourism focussed businesses are located at Moruya Airport. Skydive Oz conduct parachuting operations from a facility at the airport, regularly hosting the annual NSW & ACT State Skydiving Championship. South Coast Seaplanes, based at the airport offer a charter service and scenic flights. They announced plans for scheduled flights between Moruya and Lake Burley Griffin in Canberra twice per week in 2022, subject to a number of approvals.

== Airport facilities ==
The airfield has two sealed runways orientated North to South and Northeast to Southwest. The primary runway, 18/36 measures 1,523 m × 30 m (4,997 ft × 98 ft) and is equipped with pilot-operated lighting for night operations, while the shorter 04/22 is 827 m (2,713 ft) in length and is used mainly by light aircraft. The volume of traffic at the airport is generally low, so there is no control tower. Instead, pilots are required to communicate via a Common Traffic Advisory Frequency (CTAF) to safely co-ordinate arrivals and departures. A Non-Directional Beacon (NDB) previously located at the airport was decommissioned in 2016. Both Avgas and Jet A1 fuel is available.

Eurobodalla Shire Council is planning to enlarge the terminal, increase the size of the apron, extend the runway and build a parallel taxiway.

== Airlines and destinations ==
Airlines	Destinations
Rex Airlines	Merimbula, Sydney

== See also ==
- List of airports in New South Wales
