= Fair Entitlements Guarantee =

Australian government program

The Fair Entitlements Guarantee is an Australian legislative scheme under which employees may receive financial assistance to cover certain specified employment entitlements where an employee loses their job due to the bankruptcy or liquidation of their employer and their employer does not have sufficient cash or assets to cover the entitlements.
