= Coober Pedy Airport =

Airport in South Australia

- IATA: CPD; ICAO: YCBP

Summary
- Airport type: Public
- Operator: District Council of Coober Pedy
- Location: Coober Pedy, South Australia
- Elevation AMSL: 740 ft / 226 m
- Coordinates: 29°02′24″S 134°43′18″E

Map
- Location in South Australia

Runways
Direction	Length		Surface
Direction	m	ft	Surface
04/22	1,428	4,685	Asphalt
14/32	829	2,720	Gravel
- Sources: Australian AIP and aerodrome chart

Coober Pedy Airport (IATA: CPD, ICAO: YCBP) serves the opal mining town of Coober Pedy in outback South Australia. It is located southwest of the township. The airfield, which was renamed Redstone Airport in-game, was featured in the 2016 racing video game Forza Horizon 3 on the Xbox One and is often used for drag races.

== Airlines and destinations ==
Airlines	Destinations
Rex Airlines	Adelaide

== See also ==
- List of airports in South Australia
