= Flight West =

Regional airline of Australia

IATA	ICAO	Call sign
YC	FWQ	UNITY
- Founded: May 1987
- Ceased operations: December 2001
- Hubs: Brisbane; Cairns; Townsville
- Headquarters: Brisbane, Queensland, Australia
- Key people: Dennis Buchanan (founder)
- Website: www.flightwest.com.au

Flight West was an Australian regional airline headquartered in Brisbane, Queensland. Established in May 1987, it operated predominantly in Queensland. It entered voluntary administration in June 2001 before being sold to Queensland Aviation Holdings, the parent company of Alliance Airlines in April 2002.

== History ==
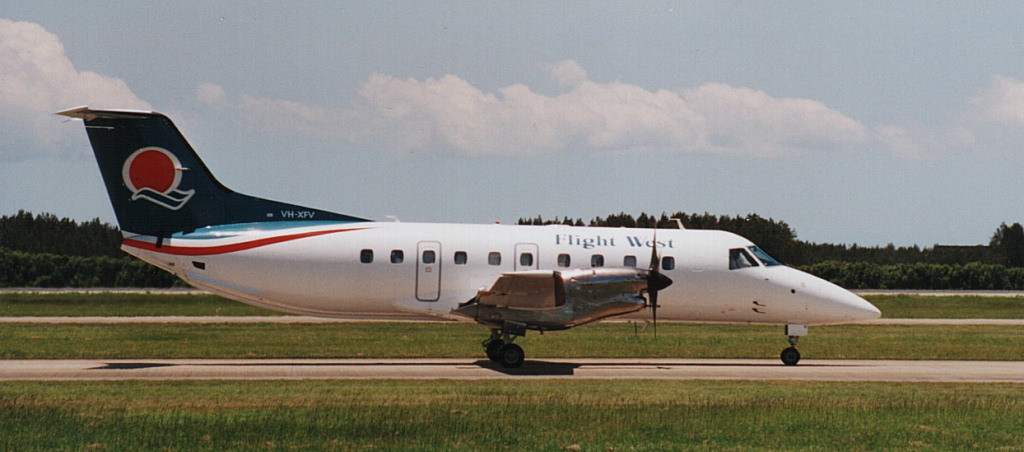
Embraer EMB 120 at Brisbane Airport in December 1999

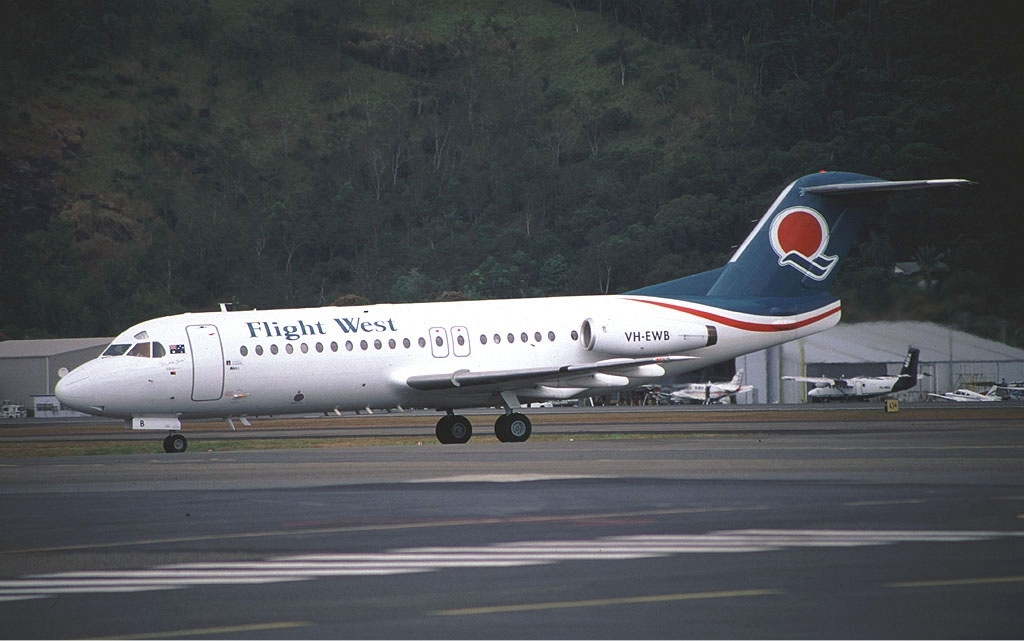
Fokker F28 at Cairns Airport in July 2000

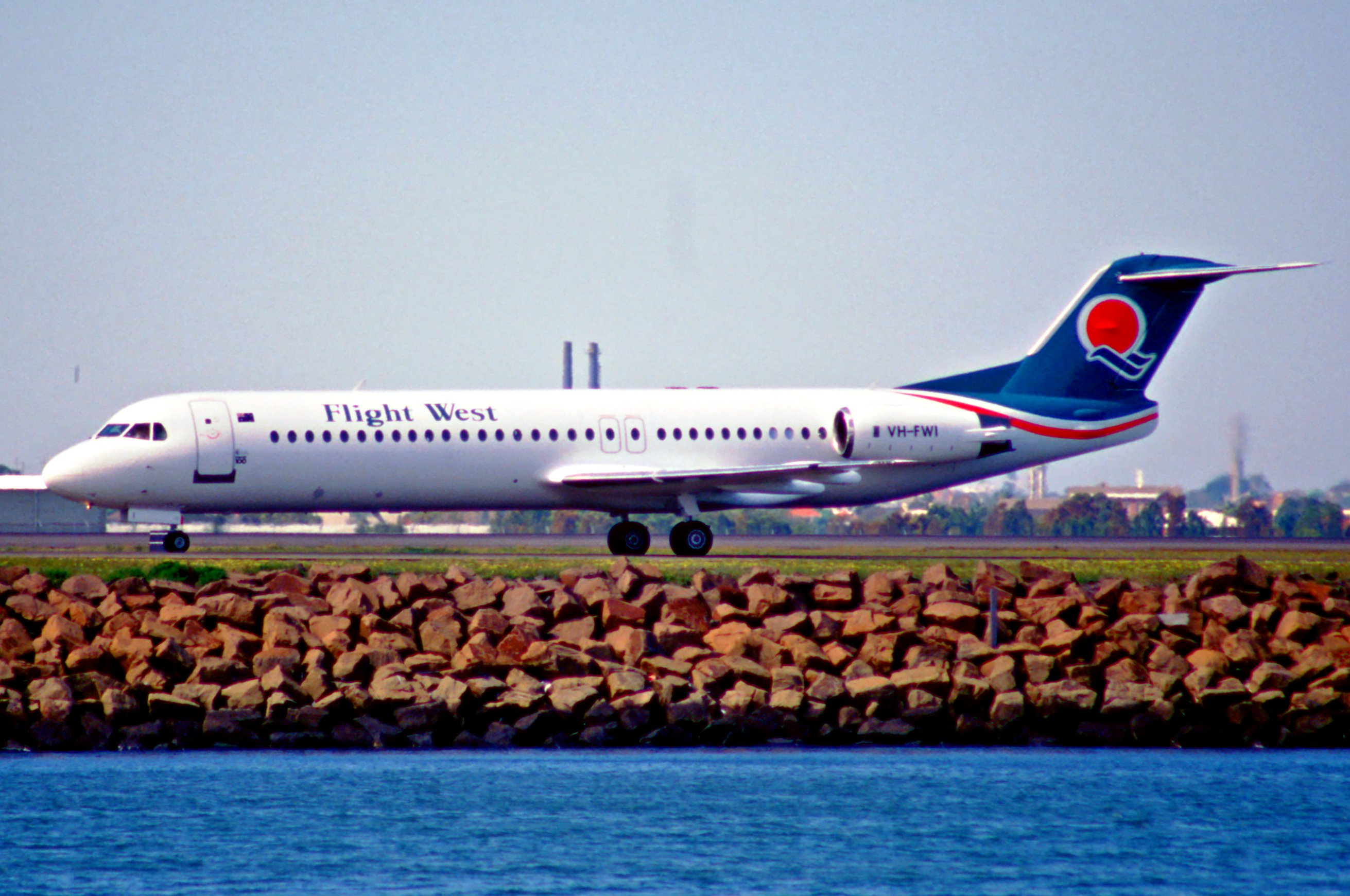
Fokker 100 at Sydney Airport in September 1999

Flight West was established by Dennis Buchanan in 1987 to operate subsidised passenger services to remote communities on Government of Queensland contracts.

Initially the airline used Beechcraft Super King Air aircraft on these services from a base at Brisbane Airport and then quickly expanded, adding DHC-6 Twin Otters an EMB 110, Jetstream 32s and then ex Ansett Fokker F28s to initially operate the Brisbane to Norfolk Island service later purchasing two Fokker 100s. A second base was established at Cairns Airport. It was soon operating the most extensive network of routes throughout regional Queensland.

From bases in Brisbane, Cairns and Townsville it served major cities and small regional communities throughout the state including communities on Cape York Peninsula and in the Torres Strait, major coastal cities and islands, and cities and towns in western Queensland.

The airline was affiliated with (but independent of) Ansett which ceased operations on 14 September 2001. Before entering liquidation in June 2001, Flight West serviced 34 destinations and employed over 420 staff.

=== Collapse ===
On 16 June 2001, the airline was placed into voluntary administration with PwC appointed to manage the company. Ansett announced on 27 June that it would lease eight of the company's aircraft and restart 16 routes effective immediately. On 13 September 2001, Ansett itself collapsed, again halting Flight West services. After extensive restructuring, the airline was offered for sale on 29 September 2001. In an effort to revitalise the airline, the Federal Government announced on 6 November that it would underwrite the airline's operating costs for three months. The airline began flights between Brisbane and Gladstone on 17 November 2001. After the airline failed to sell, it was placed into voluntary administration on 4 December 2001.

In April 2002, Queensland Aviation Holdings purchased Flight West and intended to restructure the company under a new name, Alliance Airlines. Two Embraer EMB 120s and two Fokker 100s were included in the sale.

== Fleet ==
In the mid 1990s, the fleet was composed of Beechcraft King Airs, DHC-6 Twin Otters, de Havilland Canada Dash 8s, Embraer EMB 110s and EMB 120s. By the late 1990s the airline had disposed of the Twin Otters and EMB 110s. It acquired Jetstream J32s and jet aircraft in the form of three ex-Ansett Fokker F28s followed shortly after by two newer Fokker 100s.

At the suspension of services, Flight West operated a fleet of 16 jet and turboprop aircraft:

Aircraft	In fleet	Notes
Jetstream 32ER	4	
Embraer 120ER Brasilia	7	
Fokker F28-4000	3	
Fokker 100	2	

== Destinations ==
Flight West operated 34 routes at the time its services were suspended.

Over the airline's 14-year history, it operated to destinations in Queensland, New South Wales, the Northern Territory and Norfolk Island including:

- Bamaga
- Barcaldine
- Bedourie
- Birdsville
- Blackwater
- Boulia
- Brisbane
- Bundaberg
- Cairns
- Charleville
- Coen
- Cooktown
- Doomadgee
- Edward River
- Emerald
- Gladstone
- Hervey Bay
- Hughenden
- Julia Creek
- Kurumba
- Kowanyama
- Lockhart River
- Longreach
- Mackay
- Moree
- Mornington Island
- Mount Isa
- Normanton
- Norfolk Island
- Proserpine
- Quilpie
- Richmond,
- Rockhampton
- Roma
- Sydney
- Thursday Island
- Townsville
- Weipa
- Windorah
- Winton
