= ULP =

ULP may refer to:

== Science and technology ==
- Unit in the last place in computer science
- File extension for CadSoft/Autodesk EAGLE User Language Program

== Organisations ==
- Université Louis Pasteur, Strasbourg, France
- Former United Labour Party (New Zealand)
- Unity Labour Party, Saint Vincent and the Grenadines

== Other uses ==
- Unfair labor practice, in US labor law
- Quilpie Airport, IATA airport code "ULP"
