= The Monument Airport =

- IATA: PHQ; ICAO: YTMO

Summary
- Airport type: Private
- Operator: Southern Cross Fertilisers Pty Ltd
- Serves: Phosphate Hill, Queensland, Australia
- Elevation AMSL: 949 ft (289 m)
- Coordinates: 21°48′42″S 139°55′24″E

Map
- Location in Queensland

Runways
Direction	Length		Surface
Direction	m	ft	Surface
14/32	1,900	6,234	Asphalt
- Sources: Australian AIP and aerodrome chart

The Monument Airport (IATA: PHQ, ICAO: YTMO), a.k.a. Phosphate Hill Airport is located at Phosphate Hill, Queensland, Australia.

== Airlines and destinations ==
Airlines	Destinations
Alliance Airlines	Mining charter: Brisbane, Mount Isa, Townsville

== Geography ==
=== Climate ===
Due to its very high evapotranspiration, the airport experiences a subtropical desert climate (Köppen: BWh) with very hot, somewhat wetter summers and very mild and very dry winters. The wettest recorded day was 27 March 2019 with 158.8 mm (6.25 in) of rainfall. Extreme temperatures ranged from 46.5 °C (115.7 °F) on 1 December 2006 to −1.0 °C (30.2 °F) on 18 June 2001 and 17 July 2002.

Climate data for The Monument Airport (21.81°S 139.93°E) (288 m (945 ft) AMSL) (2000-2025)
Month	Jan	Feb	Mar	Apr	May	Jun	Jul	Aug	Sep	Oct	Nov	Dec	Year
Record high °C (°F)	45.9 (114.6)	44.1 (111.4)	44.1 (111.4)	39.3 (102.7)	37.5 (99.5)	34.1 (93.4)	34.6 (94.3)	38.5 (101.3)	41.1 (106.0)	43.8 (110.8)	44.6 (112.3)	46.5 (115.7)	46.5 (115.7)
Mean daily maximum °C (°F)	38.1 (100.6)	36.9 (98.4)	35.7 (96.3)	32.5 (90.5)	27.8 (82.0)	24.2 (75.6)	24.1 (75.4)	27.1 (80.8)	31.7 (89.1)	35.5 (95.9)	37.4 (99.3)	38.4 (101.1)	32.4 (90.4)
Mean daily minimum °C (°F)	24.9 (76.8)	23.5 (74.3)	22.0 (71.6)	17.3 (63.1)	12.1 (53.8)	8.3 (46.9)	7.2 (45.0)	9.0 (48.2)	13.9 (57.0)	18.4 (65.1)	21.6 (70.9)	23.8 (74.8)	16.8 (62.3)
Record low °C (°F)	15.4 (59.7)	13.7 (56.7)	10.6 (51.1)	7.0 (44.6)	1.0 (33.8)	−1.0 (30.2)	−1.0 (30.2)	0.0 (32.0)	3.8 (38.8)	6.1 (43.0)	10.6 (51.1)	14.3 (57.7)	−1.0 (30.2)
Average precipitation mm (inches)	64.1 (2.52)	78.8 (3.10)	53.5 (2.11)	13.2 (0.52)	8.5 (0.33)	9.6 (0.38)	11.4 (0.45)	2.9 (0.11)	9.4 (0.37)	11.4 (0.45)	34.7 (1.37)	49.6 (1.95)	343.6 (13.53)
Average precipitation days (≥ 0.2 mm)	7.7	6.7	5.1	1.7	1.4	1.9	1.5	0.8	2.0	3.0	5.1	6.4	43.3
Average afternoon relative humidity (%)	34	31	23	23	23	28	24	19	17	14	18	25	23
Average dew point °C (°F)	13.7 (56.7)	13.4 (56.1)	9.1 (48.4)	6.3 (43.3)	3.0 (37.4)	2.7 (36.9)	0.2 (32.4)	−1.2 (29.8)	0.4 (32.7)	0.3 (32.5)	4.7 (40.5)	9.3 (48.7)	5.2 (41.3)
Source: Bureau of Meteorology (2000-2025)

== See also ==
- List of airports in Queensland
