= BQL =

BQL may refer to:

- BQL (group), a Slovene pop group
- Boulia Airport, Queensland, Australia (IATA code: BQL)
