= Toowoomba Wellcamp Airport =

Airport in Queensland, Australia

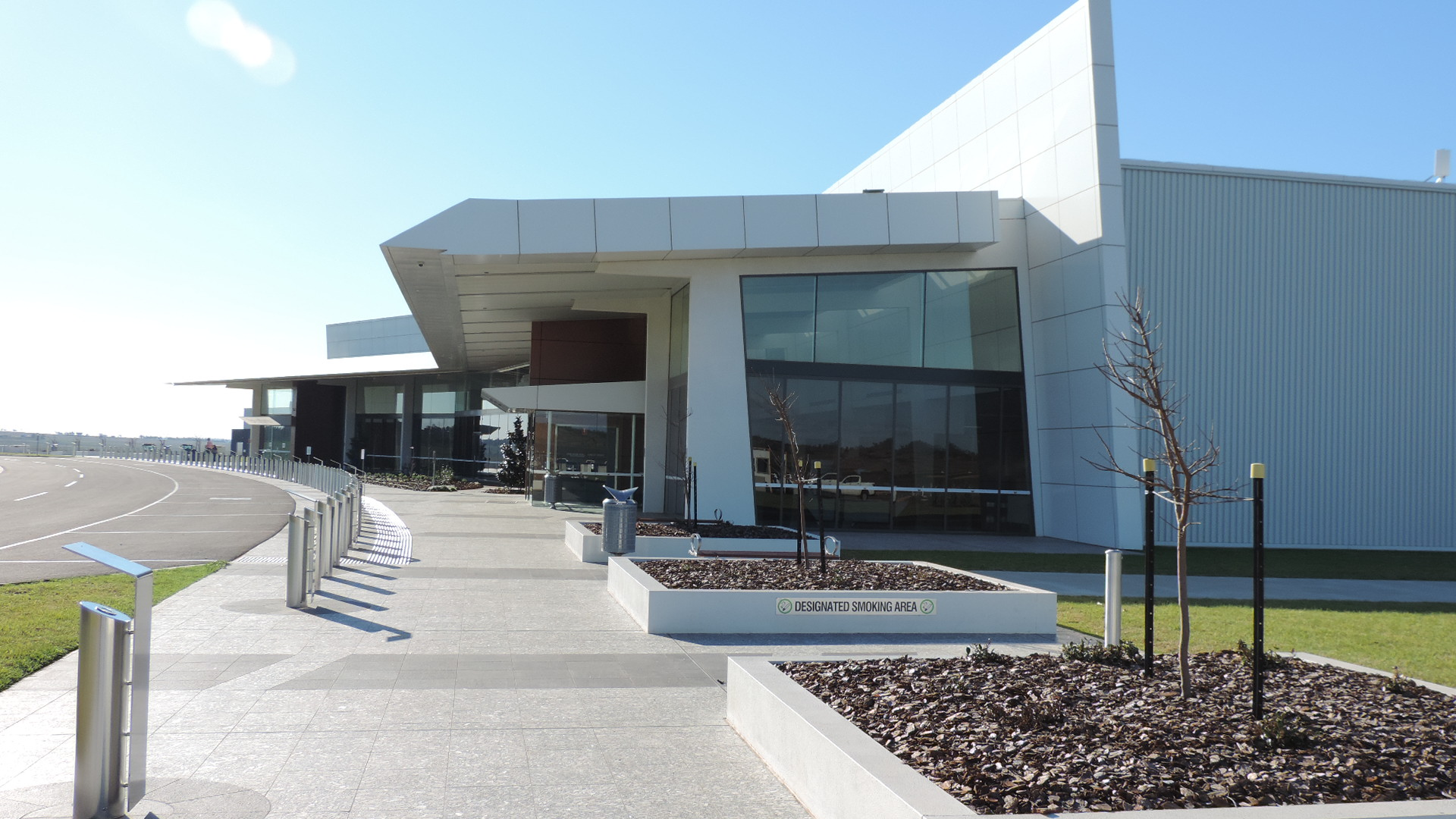
- IATA: WTB; ICAO: YBWW

Summary
- Airport type: Public
- Owner/Operator: Wagners
- Serves: Toowoomba
- Location: Wellcamp
- Opened: November 2014
- Time zone: AEST (+10:00)
- Elevation AMSL: 1,509 ft (460 m)
- Coordinates: 27°33′30″S 151°47′36″E
- Website: www.wellcamp.com.au

Map
- Location in Queensland

Runways
| Direction | Length | | Surface |
| Direction | m | ft | Surface |
|---|---|---|---|
| 12/30 | 2,870 | 9,420 | Asphalt |

Statistics (YE2021)
- Passengers: 18,651
- Passenger change: ▼34.1%
- Sources: Airservices Australia

Toowoomba Wellcamp Airport (IATA: WTB, ICAO: YBWW, formerly Brisbane West Wellcamp Airport) is an airport in Wellcamp, 8.4 nautical miles (15.6 km; 9.7 mi) west from the CBD of Toowoomba, Queensland, Australia.

The airport and an associated aviation and business park is the brainchild of Wagners, a business family prominent in the Toowoomba region. It is the first major greenfield public airport development in Australia since Melbourne Airport opened in 1970. It is also the first privately funded major airport in the country.

The airport is rated at Code E and with its 2,870-metre (9,416 ft) long by 45-metre (148 ft) wide runway can handle aircraft the size and weight of Boeing 747-400 and Boeing 747-8s. The airport is estimated to have a catchment area of 344,000 people and in 2017 handled 157,000 passengers (a 25.9% growth from the previous year), making it the 33rd busiest regional airport in Australia annually.

== History ==
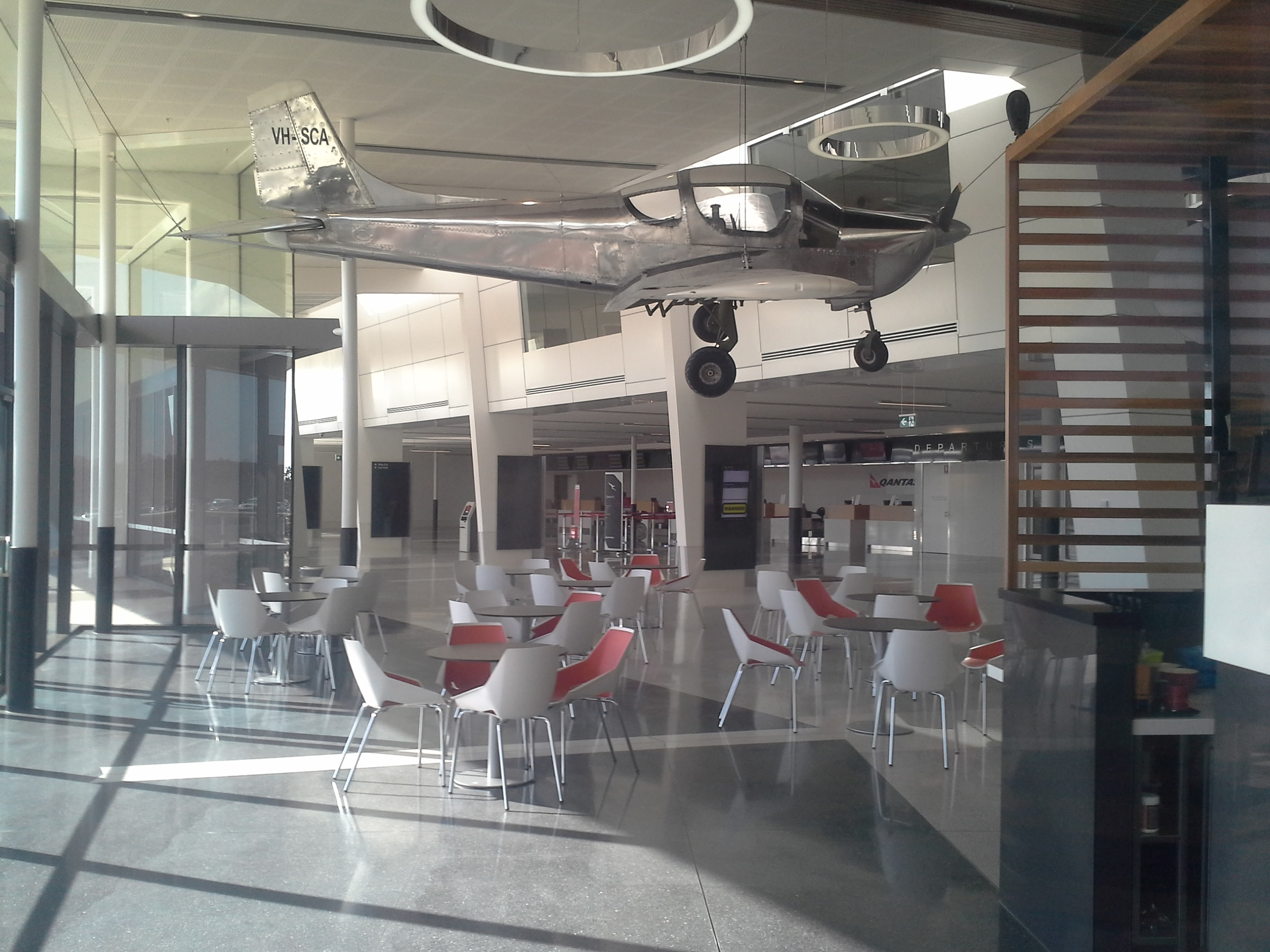
QantasLink check in counter, cafe and Southern Cross SC-1 prototype on display.

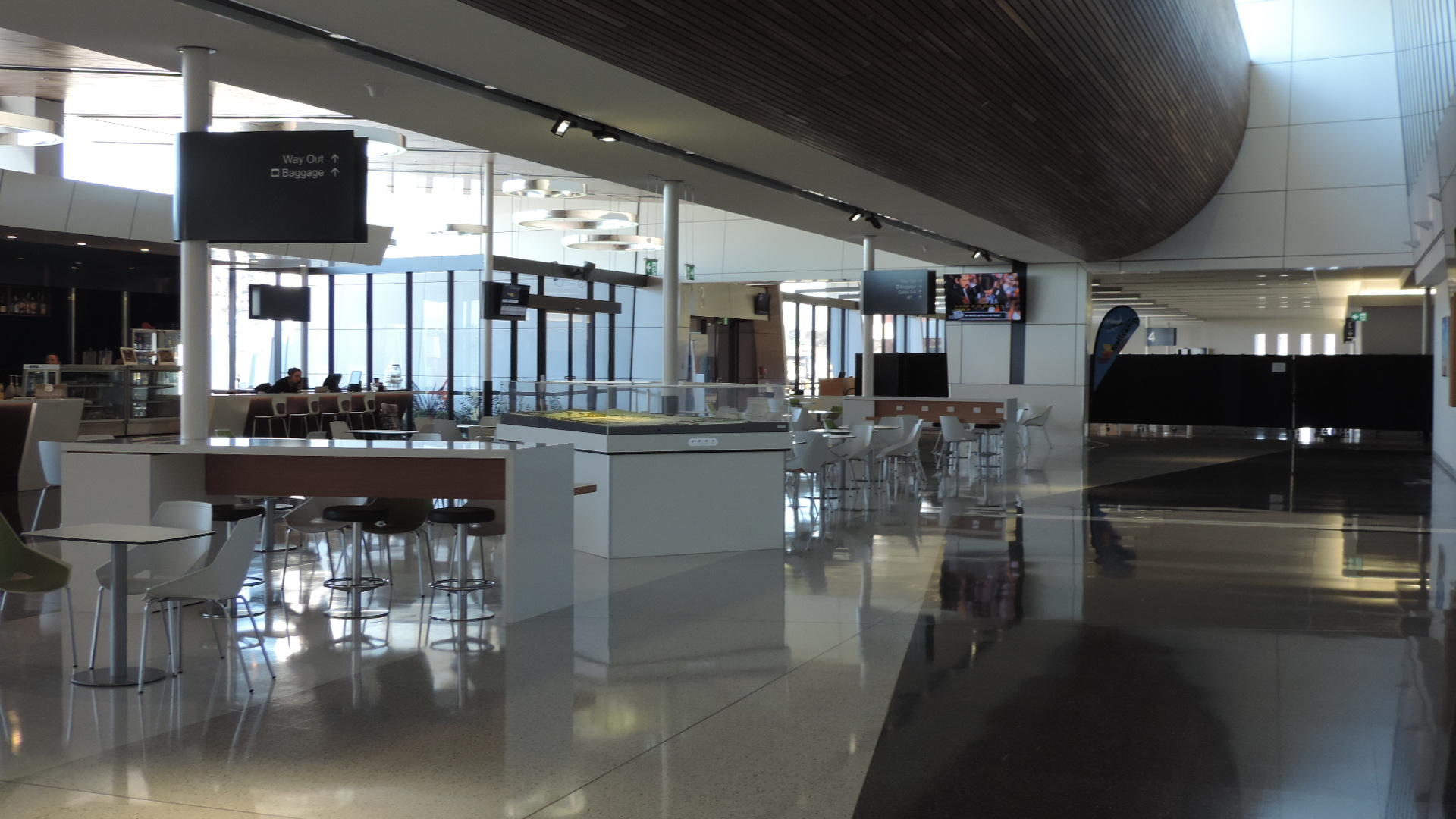
Café inside the passenger terminal, 2016

Prior to the construction of this airport, the Toowoomba region had not been serviced by a jet-capable airport at any time in the city's history. The existing Toowoomba City Aerodrome at Wilsonton in suburban residential Toowoomba has been historically restricted in development due to local council land development policy and poor local planning, although a runway extension in 2011 allowed for improved scheduled services with turboprop aircraft.

The Darling Downs and Surat Basin regions were subject to significant growth between 2005 and 2013, primarily due to coal mining and coal seam gas exploration. This industrial expansion coupled with the development of a transport hub and industrial estate at Charlton (10 km west of Toowoomba) provided the land corridor immediately west of Toowoomba with government-endorsed transport development opportunities.

Construction on the site, a former quarry owned by the Wagner family since 1994, began in April 2013, with an ambitious timeframe for completion by October 2014.

On 22 November 2013, a Beechcraft King Air owned and piloted by John Wagner became the first aircraft to land on the new runway. On 15 January 2014, the first concrete for the terminal building was poured. In June 2014, work began on sealing the runway and movement areas using EFC, a low-carbon cement-free concrete developed by Wagners, boosting the airport's green credentials.

On 3 September 2014, Qantas became the first airline to announce regular services from the airport. Regional services operated under contract to the Government of Queensland transferred from Toowoomba City Aerodrome to Wellcamp on 1 January 2015. On 17 November 2014, the first scheduled passenger service commenced, operating between Sydney Airport and Wellcamp airport.

On 23 November 2015, the first jumbo aircraft arrived from Sydney. The Cathay Pacific 747 freighter aircraft made a brief stop en route from Sydney Airport to Hong Kong to collect produce bound for China. The trial service uplifted 58 tonnes of fresh produce during the stop.

In March 2016, services to Cairns and Melbourne with Airnorth commenced, followed by Townsville in November.

In October 2016, Cathay Pacific announced the opening of weekly cargo services starting on 22 November 2016, from Wellcamp to Hong Kong using a 747 freighter aircraft. This service operated from Hong Kong to Sydney, and returning via stops in Melbourne and Wellcamp. Cathay Pacific also announced that the first cargo export booking from Toowoomba was for a live crocodile.

On 22 October 2016, the first international passenger flight stopped at Wellcamp airport. This also marked the first Airbus A330 flight at the airport. The service was a charter originating in Sydney before stopping at Wellcamp to collect 250 people traveling to Shanghai, China for a trade conference.

On 11 November 2016, the airport was designated as an international airport and as a regional international gateway.

In July 2018, Airnorth announced the cancellation of the Wellcamp-Cairns route from October 2018.

In 2019, a one off flight to the airport was carried out by TNT, as well as DHL later that year.

In September 2022, Virgin Orbit signed an agreement with Wagners to base a Boeing 747-400 launch aircraft at the airport with a demonstrator small satellite launch initially planned for 2024. However, in April 2023, Virgin Orbit filed for bankruptcy, with no launches ever taking place.

In May 2025, Cathay Pacific announced that the last scheduled cargo flight would be on 10 June 2025. From there, the service would be moved to Brisbane Airport, first flying on 17 June 2025.

== Controversy ==
The Wagner family submitted to the amalgamated Toowoomba Regional Council a plan for a large-scale airport and industrial development in 2012, utilising an extant planning code from the pre-amalgamated council statutes. The submission occurred on the last available day prior to post-amalgamation planning codes taking effect. This resulted in a diminished requirement for community consultation which was met with scepticism by some media and local residents.

The initial submission was also completed without consultation with local airspace owners, primarily the Department of Defence, which controls much of the local airspace via the Oakey and Amberley military restricted airspace zones. This has subsequently required considerable consultation, and has been complicated by effective endorsement of the privately funded public airport development at all governmental levels despite potential impacts on the Department of Defence. Changes to the military airspace around Oakey and Amberley were subsequently announced in November 2013 to allow the continuation of military flying activities at these bases and civilian operations from Wellcamp once it became operational.

Former Lord Mayor of Brisbane, Graham Quirk, expressed opposition to the use of the previous name "Brisbane West" for an airport 130 km (81 mi) west of Brisbane, saying it would mislead visitors.

In June 2023, Elizabeth Watson-Brown, the Greens federal MP for the Brisbane seat of Ryan, proposed to reduce aircraft noise over Brisbane by limiting the number of flights that could use Brisbane Airport and having a 10pm curfew. Other flights to Brisbane would use Toowoomba Wellcamp with passengers transferred to Brisbane via a publicly-owned high-speed rail service. No costings were provided for the high-speed rail service. The plan was criticised for the increased cost and time of flights to Queensland with impacts on tourism, the local economy, and increasing the difficulties of rural people travelling to Brisbane for healthcare.

== Transport hub ==
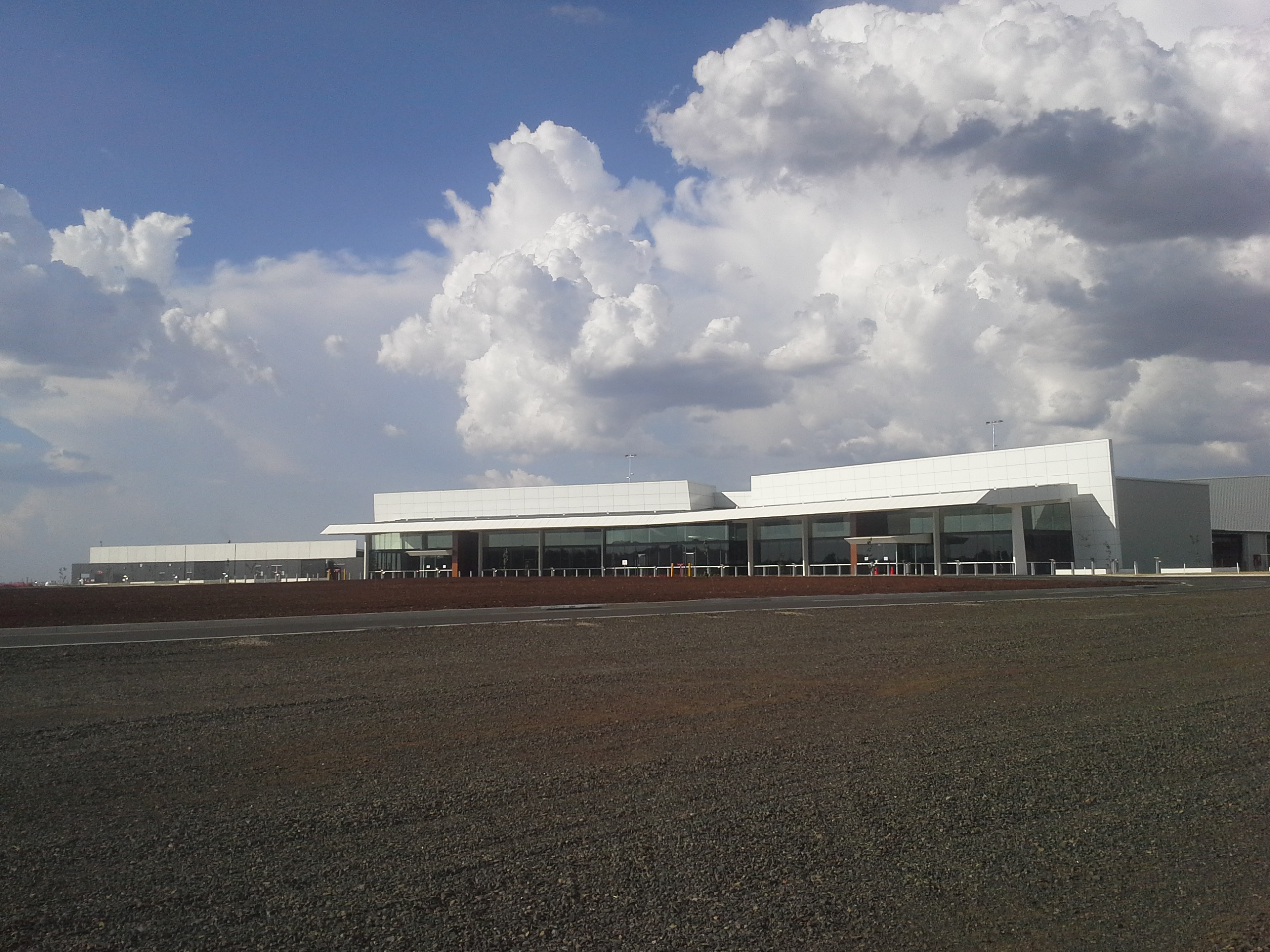
The main terminal building.

The airport is located adjacent to the Toowoomba Bypass, between Charlton and Athol. It is also near the planned standard gauge Inland Rail corridor which would link Melbourne with Brisbane, thus providing a potential road-air-rail hub.

== Aviation school ==
In December 2014 the airport announced the development of an aviation education precinct, a joint project with the Airline Academy of Australia and University of Southern Queensland, to train pilots and offer courses in aircraft maintenance, engineering and electronics. The first students commenced training in February 2015.

Qantas' first Pilot Training Academy at the Wellcamp Airport opened in September 2019.

== Aircraft storage ==
During the COVID-19 pandemic, there was significantly reduced amounts of air travel, leading to airlines needing to store planes in locations which would best maintain the condition of the planes during storage, e.g. to avoid rust. On 30 September 2020, it was announced that the aircraft storage facility operated by Asia Pacific Aircraft Storage at Alice Springs Airport was approaching capacity, and some additional aircraft would be stored at Wellcamp Airport.

== Future developments ==
=== Manufacturing ===
A new facility called the Wellcamp Aerospace and Defence Precinct was announced on 21 September 2021. On the same date, Boeing Australia announced plans to build an uncrewed aerial vehicle manufacturing facility at Wellcamp for the Boeing MQ-28 Ghost Bat project. This deal is worth up to $1 billion for Queensland's economy over 10 years.

== Airlines and destinations ==
=== Passenger ===
| Airlines | Destinations |
|---|---|
| QantasLink | Sydney |
| Rex Airlines | Bedourie, Birdsville, Boulia, Brisbane, Charleville, Cunnamulla, Mount Isa, Quilpie, St George, Thargomindah, Windorah |

== Statistics ==
Wellcamp Airport statistics
| Year | Domestic passengers | Aircraft movements | International air freight (tonnes) | Notes |
|---|---|---|---|---|
| 2014 | 6,037 | 120 | — | Passenger services commenced on 17 November 2014. |
| 2015 | 62,050 | 2,085 | — | |
| 2016 | 112,199 | 3,225 | 87 | Air freight services commenced on 22 November 2016. |
| 2017 | 142,966 | 3,963 | 661 | |
| 2018 | 127,642 | 3,557 | 1,243 | |
| 2019 | 110,357 | 3,185 | 1,051 | |
| 2020 | 28,319 | 1,719 | 2,905 | |
| 2021 | 18,651 | 1,663 | 2,911 | |
| 2022 | 36,942 | 1,860 | 1,030 | |
| 2023 | 65,272 | 1,834 | 1,525 | |

== See also ==
- List of airports in Australia
- Toowoomba City Aerodrome, a nearby airport which was previously the main airport serving the city
