= Southern Cross Aviation SC-1 =

Australian civil aircraft

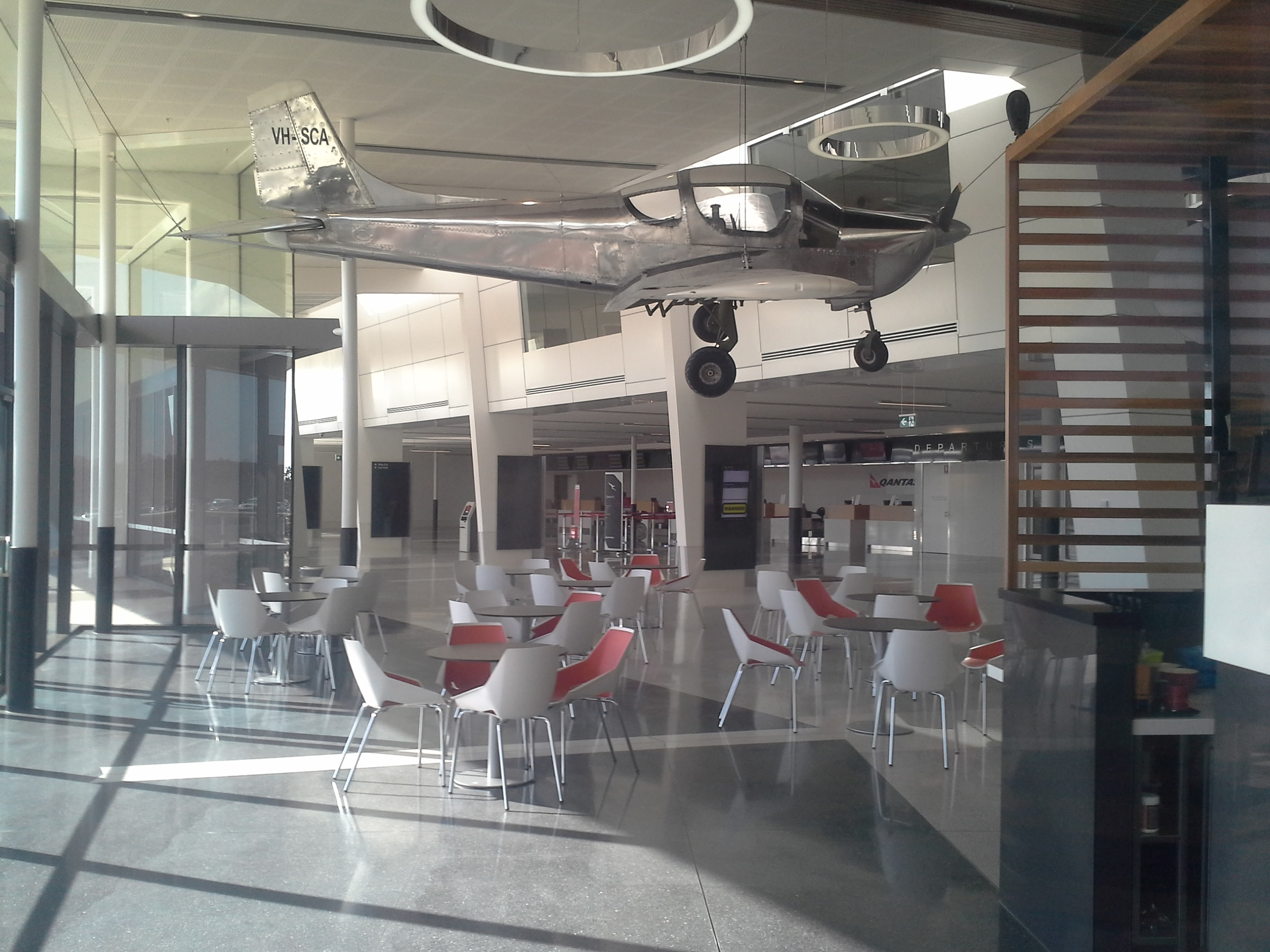
- Southern Cross Aviation SC-1 on display at Toowoomba Wellcamp Airport.

General information
- Type: civil aircraft
- Manufacturer: Southern Cross Aviation
- Designer: Newton D. Hodgekiss and Brian Wager
- Status: Preserved
- Number built: 1

History
- First flight: 1961

The Southern Cross SC-1 was an Australian civil aircraft.

== Design and development ==
During the late 1950s and early 1960s several Australian companies made attempts to launch light aircraft production in Australia. Victa – a company well known for the lawn mowers which featured prominently during the Sydney 2000 Olympic closing ceremony – tooled up to produce their Airtourer and Fawcett Aviation designed and flew a single prototype of their high-wing Fawcett 120. Another development during this period was carried out by the Toowoomba Foundry, an agricultural equipment manufacturer based in Toowoomba, located west of Brisbane in southeastern Queensland.

In 1957 Toowoomba Foundries set up a new division, Southern Cross Aviation Limited, with the intention of designing and constructing a new 4-place training and touring plane. Land was purchased by Southern Cross Aviation adjacent to Toowoomba airport, but due to council planning delays, design work was commenced in a section of Toowoomba Foundry's existing factory. An experienced designer, Newton Hodgekiss, joined the team, responsible for design and drafting of the new aircraft. Hodgekiss had worked at the UK firm Handley Page for seven years, during which he had been a member of the design team for the Victor B.1 bomber.

Construction of the prototype commenced in mid 1959, and the SC1 rolled out for its first taxiing trials in February 1961. The first flight took place on March 1, 1961, with an "unofficial" circuit of the airfield. The "official" first flight took place the following day, with a total of 60 minutes in the air. A total of 25 hours of flight testing was undertaken - all in the hands of one pilot, R.J. Trousdell - before Southern Cross Aviation took the decision to cancel testing. This was due to the economic recession during the early 60s, as well as stiff competition from Cessna and Piper importers, which would have required SCAL to market the SC1 at a price level which doomed the economics of the project.

The SC1 was found to perform very well in the air, its only vice being heavy aileron control. In later test flights the undercarriage was retracted (using a manual system), and the prototype was felt to be very pleasant to fly. In fact the undercarriage used on the SC1 outlasted it by many years, as the same trailing link rubber sprung units were installed on the Transavia PL-12 Airtruk agricultural aircraft. The prototype's good performance was partly due to its small frontal area, a feature which would have been sacrificed on production aircraft, as the cockpit was found to be too narrow for practical purposes and would need to be widened to gain useful elbow room.

Powered by a 180 hp Lycoming O-360-AIA four cylinder engine, the SC1 cruised at 160 mph and had a range of 740 miles fully loaded. The fuselage was of all-metal construction, apart from the fibreglass engine cowling. The wing was also all-metal apart from fibreglass tip fairings, and featured fowler-type flaps on the inner sections and slotted NACA flaps on the outer sections. The outer wing sections were designed to be removable for storage, as well as being capable of carrying wing-tip tanks. The airframe was designed to handle engines up to 260 hp, and was fully stressed for aerobatics.

Following the cancellation of flight testing, the prototype was placed in storage in Toowoomba, where it languished before being recovered by a group of enthusiasts from the Australian Aircraft Restoration Group (who run Moorabbin Aircraft Museum in Melbourne) in January 1970. The sole prototype was shipped to Melbourne (minus its engine and propeller) and was placed in outdoor storage. It suffered the ravages of weather and time until being dismantled and moved indoors, where it was stored for several years. Eventually it was shipped to the Museum of Australian Army Flying at Oakey, Queensland for restoration to its original state.

During its short flying career, the SC1 remained unpainted apart from the engine cowling and wing tips. These were both moulded from fibreglass and painted white. The cowling was also painted black on top in front of the windscreen to reduce glare. A non-slip walkway was painted on the upper surface of the wing adjacent to the cockpit entry doors. The inside of the clear canopy glazing over the pilot's head was also painted white. The aircraft was never placed onto the Australian register, but it wore the radio callsign VH-SCA on the upper starboard wing, lower port wing and either side of the tail fin.

At some point during its subsequent storage and later display at Moorabbin Aircraft Museum, the aircraft was painted white overall, with two different variations of orange and black trim. There may be two explanations for this coat of paint. On outdoor display at the museum, the airframe would need protection from the harsh Australian environment – hence the coat of paint. Alternatively, there was a rumored attempt to interest Ansett Airlines in the SC1 as a basic trainer for their pilots. At that time, Ansett aircraft featured the same white, orange and black trim that appeared on the SC1.

== Aircraft on display ==
The SC-1 is displayed in the terminal at Toowoomba Wellcamp Airport, only 16 km (9.7 mi) from the Toowoomba Foundry where it was built. The aircraft has been restored to its original bare metal and white fiberglass appearance.

== Specifications (SC-1) ==
Data from Jane's All The World's Aircraft 1962–63

General characteristics

- Crew: 1
- Capacity: 3 passengers
- Length: 22 ft 7 in (6.88 m)
- Wingspan: 37 ft 0 in (11.28 m)
- Height: 7 ft 4 in (2.24 m)
- Wing area: 171.1 sq ft (15.90 m^{2})
- Aspect ratio: 8.0:1
- Empty weight: 1,450 lb (658 kg)
- Max takeoff weight: 2,525 lb (1,145 kg)
- Fuel capacity: 38 imp gal (170 L; 46 US gal)
- Powerplant: 1 × Lycoming O-360-AIA air-cooled horizontally-opposed engine, 180 hp (130 kW)

Performance

- Maximum speed: 178 mph (286 km/h, 155 kn)
- Cruise speed: 150 mph (240 km/h, 130 kn)
- Stall speed: 51 mph (82 km/h, 44 kn)
- Never exceed speed: 220 mph (350 km/h, 190 kn)
- Range: 740 mi (1,190 km, 640 nmi) (maximum payload)
- Service ceiling: 18,700 ft (5,700 m)
- Rate of climb: 1,060 ft/min (5.4 m/s)
