= Charleville Airport =

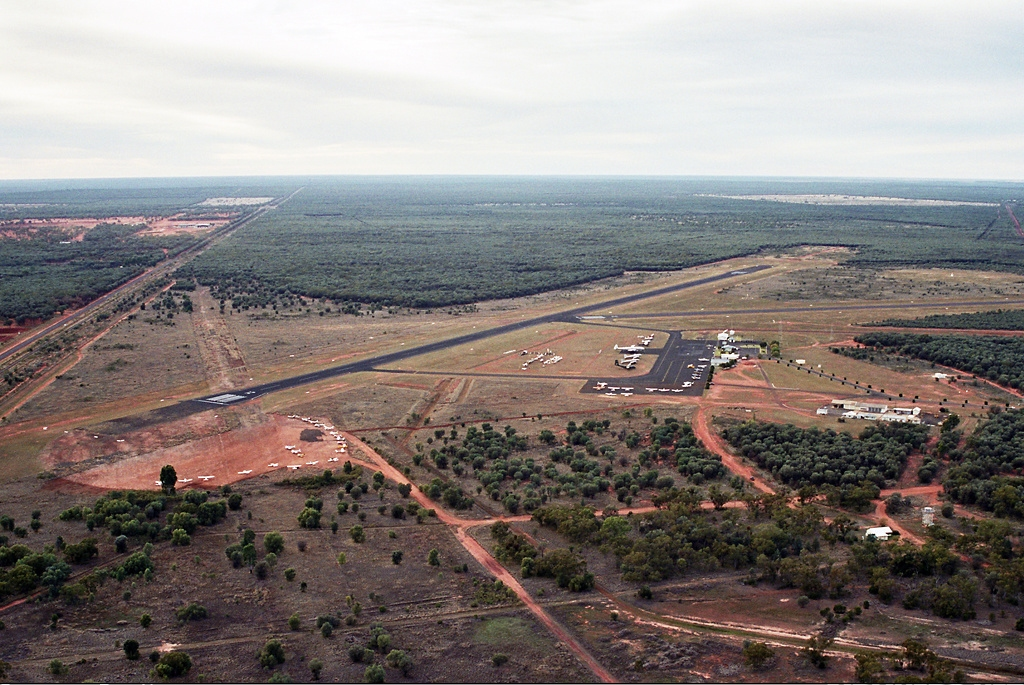
- IATA: CTL; ICAO: YBCV

Summary
- Airport type: Public
- Operator: Murweh Shire Council
- Location: Charleville, Queensland, Australia
- Elevation AMSL: 1,003 ft (306 m)
- Coordinates: 26°24′44.4″S 146°15′43.8″E

Map
- Location in Queensland

Runways
Direction	Length		Surface
Direction	m	ft	Surface
12/30	1,524	5,000	Asphalt
18/36	1,067	3,501	Asphalt
- Sources: Australian AIP and aerodrome chart

Charleville Airport (IATA: CTL, ICAO: YBCV) is an airport located 1 nautical mile (1.9 km; 1.2 mi) southwest of Charleville, a town in the state of Queensland in Australia.

The Royal Flying Doctor Service has one of its nine Queensland bases at Charleville Airport.

== Airlines and destinations ==
Airlines	Destinations
Rex Airlines	Bedourie, Birdsville, Boulia, Brisbane, Mount Isa, Quilpie, Roma, Toowoomba, Windorah

Regular services operated under contract to the Government of Queensland. Services operated by Skytrans were taken over by Regional Express Airlines from 1 January 2015.

== History ==
During World War II, the United States Army Air Forces 63d Bombardment Squadron, assigned to the Fifth Air Force 43d Bombardment Group, flew B-17 Flying Fortresses from the airfield between 15 June and 3 August 1942.

Other USAAF units assigned to Charleville were the 8th and 480th Service Squadron of the 45th Service Group.

Charleville was also the western terminus of the Air Transport Command Pacific Wing (later Division).

The Royal Australian Air Force (RAAF) had a unit at Charleville. No 15 Operational Base Unit provided support services for transiting aircraft, such as refuelling or minor maintenance.

== See also ==
- United States Army Air Forces in Australia (World War II)
- List of airports in Queensland
