= Mount Isa Airport =

Airport in Mount Isa, Queensland, Australia

- IATA: ISA; ICAO: YBMA

Summary
- Airport type: Public
- Owner: Mount Isa Airport Pty Ltd
- Operator: Queensland Airports
- Serves: Mount Isa, Queensland, Australia
- Elevation AMSL: 1,121 ft (342 m)
- Coordinates: 20°39′50″S 139°29′19″E
- Website: www.mountisaairport.com.au

Map
- Location in Queensland

Runways
Direction	Length		Surface
Direction	m	ft	Surface
16/34	2,560	8,399	Asphalt

Statistics (2024-25)
- Revenue passengers: 239,424
- Aircraft movements: 5,193
- Sources: Australian AIP and aerodrome chart BITRE

Mount Isa Airport (IATA: ISA, ICAO: YBMA) is an airport serving the western Queensland city of Mount Isa, Australia. It is served by a variety of scheduled regional airlines, with flights to Brisbane, Townsville and Cairns as well as several other regional centres.

The Royal Flying Doctor Service has one of its nine Queensland bases at Mount Isa Airport.

Since 2005 the airport has been owned by Queensland Airports, which also owns Townsville Airport, Longreach Airport and Gold Coast Airport.

== History ==
The 2012-13 financial year was the busiest on record for Mount Isa Airport, handling 263,665 revenue passengers.

In 2019, the airport was a base for relief efforts for the North West Queensland floods.

== Facilities ==
The airport resides at an elevation of 1,121 ft (342 m) above sea level. It has one runway designated 16/34 with an asphalt surface measuring 2,560 m × 45 m (8,399 ft × 148 ft) and is 3.4 nautical miles (6.3 km; 3.9 mi) north of the city

== Airlines and destinations ==
Airlines	Destinations
Alliance Airlines	Mining Charter: Phosphate Hill
Qantas	Brisbane
QantasLink	Brisbane, Cloncurry, Townsville
Rex Airlines (Note: Rex services operated under subsidy from the Queensland Government on defined routes with multiple intermediate stops)	Bedourie, Birdsville, Brisbane, (Note: Western 2 route - Brisbane-Toowoomba-Charleville-Quilpie-Windorah-Birdsville-Bedourie-Boulia-Mount Isa) Burketown, Boulia, Cairns, Charleville, Doomadgee, Gununa, Hughenden, Julia Creek, Karumba, Normanton, Quilpie, Richmond, Toowoomba, Townsville, (Note: Northern 2 route - Townsville-Hughenden-Richmond-Julia Creek-Mount Isa) (Note: Gulf route - Cairns-Normanton-Mornington Island-Burketown-Doomadgee-Mount Isa) Windorah
Virgin Australia	Brisbane

== Statistics ==
Mount Isa Airport was ranked 29th in Australia for the number of revenue passengers served in financial year 2024–2025.

Annual passenger and aircraft statistics for Mount Isa
Year	Revenue passengers	Aircraft movements
2015-16	188,635	4,878
2016–17	185,306	4,765
2017–18	197,872	4,779
2018–19	208,247	4,919
2019–20	182,930	4,493
2020–21	173,439	4,480
2021–22	195,956	4,921
2022–23	230,663	4,922
2023–24	232,297	4,802
2024–25	239,424	5,195

== Accidents and incidents ==
On 22 September 1966 a Vickers Viscount aircraft departed from Mount Isa Airport with twenty passengers for a flight to Brisbane via Longreach. Forty-four minutes after takeoff a fire started in one of the engines. The crew were unable to extinguish the fire or feather the propeller so made an emergency descent with the intention of landing at Winton, a town 225 NM (417 km; 259 mi) south-east of Mount Isa. The fire spread to the fuel tank and weakened the wing structure so that a large part of the left wing broke away. The aircraft crashed 12 mi (19 km) west of Winton. All on board were killed. It remains the fifth-worst accident in Australia's civil aviation history.

== See also ==
- List of airports in Queensland
