= Bedourie Airport =

Airport in Queensland, Australia

- IATA: BEU; ICAO: YBIE

Summary
- Airport type: Public
- Operator: Diamantina Shire Council
- Location: Bedourie, Queensland, Australia
- Elevation AMSL: 300 ft / 91 m
- Coordinates: 24°20′46″S 139°27′36″E

Map
- Location in Queensland

Runways
Direction	Length		Surface
Direction	m	ft	Surface
14/32	1,810	5,938	Asphalt
- Sources: Australian AIP and aerodrome chart

Bedourie Airport (IATA: BEU, ICAO: YBIE) is an airport in Bedourie, Queensland, Australia.

== Airlines and destinations ==
Airlines	Destinations
Rex Airlines	Birdsville, Boulia, Brisbane, Charleville, Mount Isa, Quilpie, Toowoomba, Windorah

== See also ==
- List of airports in Queensland
