= Windorah Airport =

Airport in Queensland, Australia

- IATA: WNR; ICAO: YWDH

Summary
- Airport type: Public
- Operator: Barcoo Shire Council
- Serves: Windorah, Queensland, Australia
- Elevation AMSL: 452 ft / 138 m
- Coordinates: 25°24′48″S 142°40′00″E

Map
- Location in Queensland

Runways
Direction	Length		Surface
Direction	m	ft	Surface
04/22	1,374	4,508	Asphalt
- Sources: Australian AIP and aerodrome chart

Windorah Airport (IATA: WNR, ICAO: YWDH) is an airport serving Windorah, Queensland, Australia. It is operated by the Barcoo Shire Council. The airport received $183,578 in funds for security upgrades from the Australian Government in 2006.

== Facilities ==
The airport is at an elevation of 452 ft (138 m) above sea level. It has one runway designated 04/22 with an asphalt surface measuring 1,374 m × 30 m (4,508 ft × 98 ft).

== Airlines and destinations ==
Airlines	Destinations
Rex Airlines	Bedourie, Birdsville, Boulia, Brisbane, Charleville, Mount Isa, Quilpie, Toowoomba

Services are operated under contract to the Government of Queensland and were taken over by Regional Express Airlines from 1 January 2015.

== See also ==
- List of airports in Queensland
