= Birdsville Airport =

Airport in Queensland, Australia

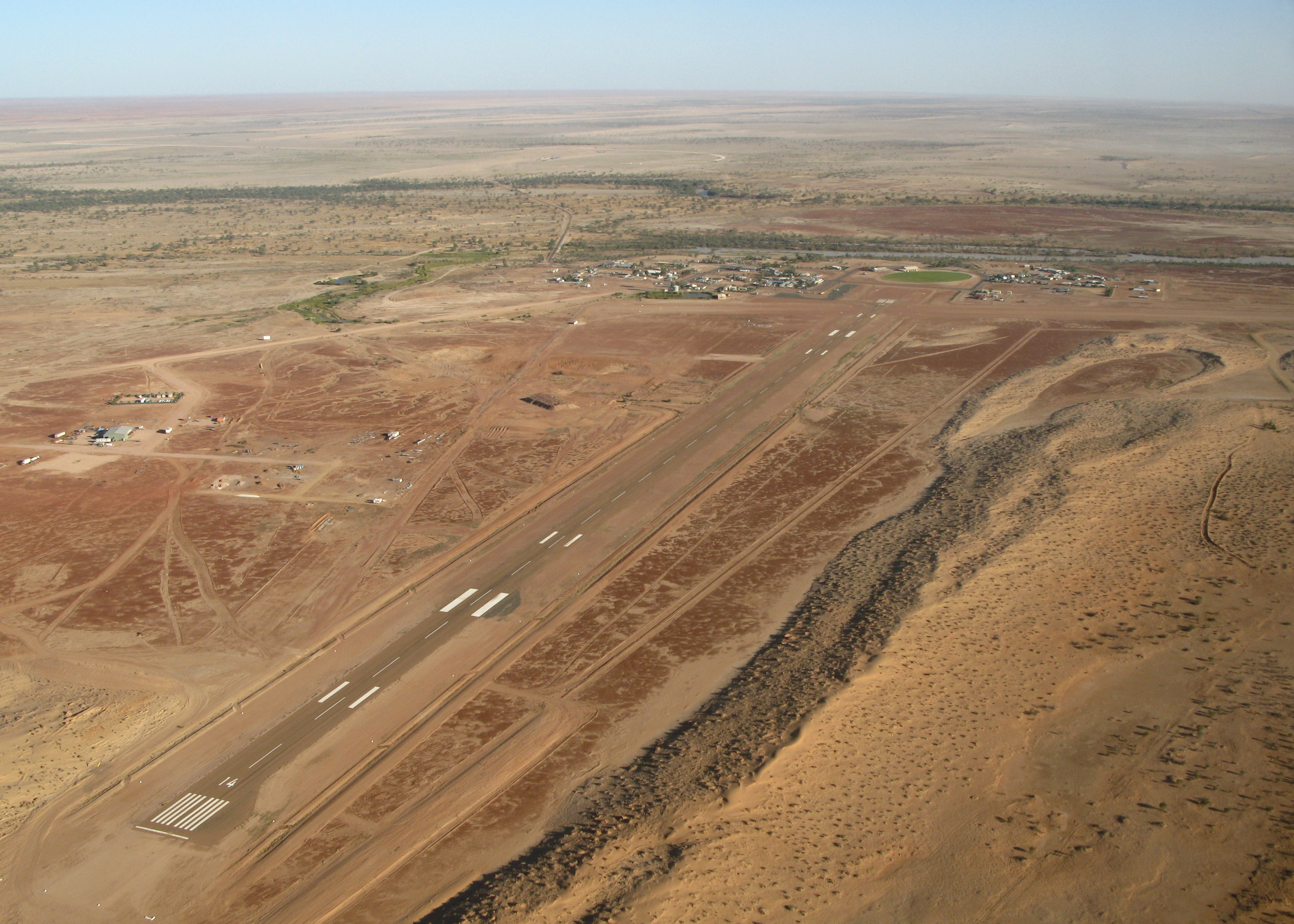
- IATA: BVI; ICAO: YBDV

Summary
- Airport type: Public
- Operator: Diamantina Shire Council
- Serves: Birdsville, Queensland, Australia
- Elevation AMSL: 159 ft (48 m)
- Coordinates: 25°53′26.8″S 139°20′39.5″E

Map
- Location in Queensland

Runways
Direction	Length		Surface
Direction	m	ft	Surface
14/32	1,732	5,682	Asphalt
03/21	1,200	3,937	Clay
- Sources: Australian AIP and aerodrome chart

Birdsville Airport (IATA: BVI, ICAO: YBDV) is an airport serving Birdsville, Queensland, Australia. During the Birdsville Races weekend each September, as many as 200 light aircraft visit the airport, with aviators permitted to camp under the wings of their planes. The Channel Mail Run, the world's longest mail run operates between Port Augusta, South Australia and Birdsville, stopping in the town to collect mail for the remote Queensland cattle stations of Glengyle and Durrie.

In September 2011, a $1.5 million upgrade was completed which included construction of a new terminal building, resurfacing and the installation of edge lights on runway 14/32 and extensions to the apron area to provide more aircraft parking and manoeuvring space. The upgrade was funded by the Diamantina Shire Council and Queensland Government's Regional Airport Development Scheme, in response to growth in aviation-related tourism leading to increased movements at the airport.

== Airlines and destinations ==
Airlines	Destinations
Rex Airlines	Bedourie, Boulia, Brisbane, Charleville, Mount Isa, Quilpie, Toowoomba, Windorah

Regular services that were operated by Skytrans are under contract to the Government of Queensland and were taken over by Regional Express Airlines from 1 January 2015.

Central Eagle Aviation operates scenic flights round Lake Eyre. West Wing Aviation operates mail flights to Port Augusta, Glengyle Station and Durrie Station as part of the Channel Mail Run.

== See also ==
- List of airports in Queensland
