= Quilpie Airport =

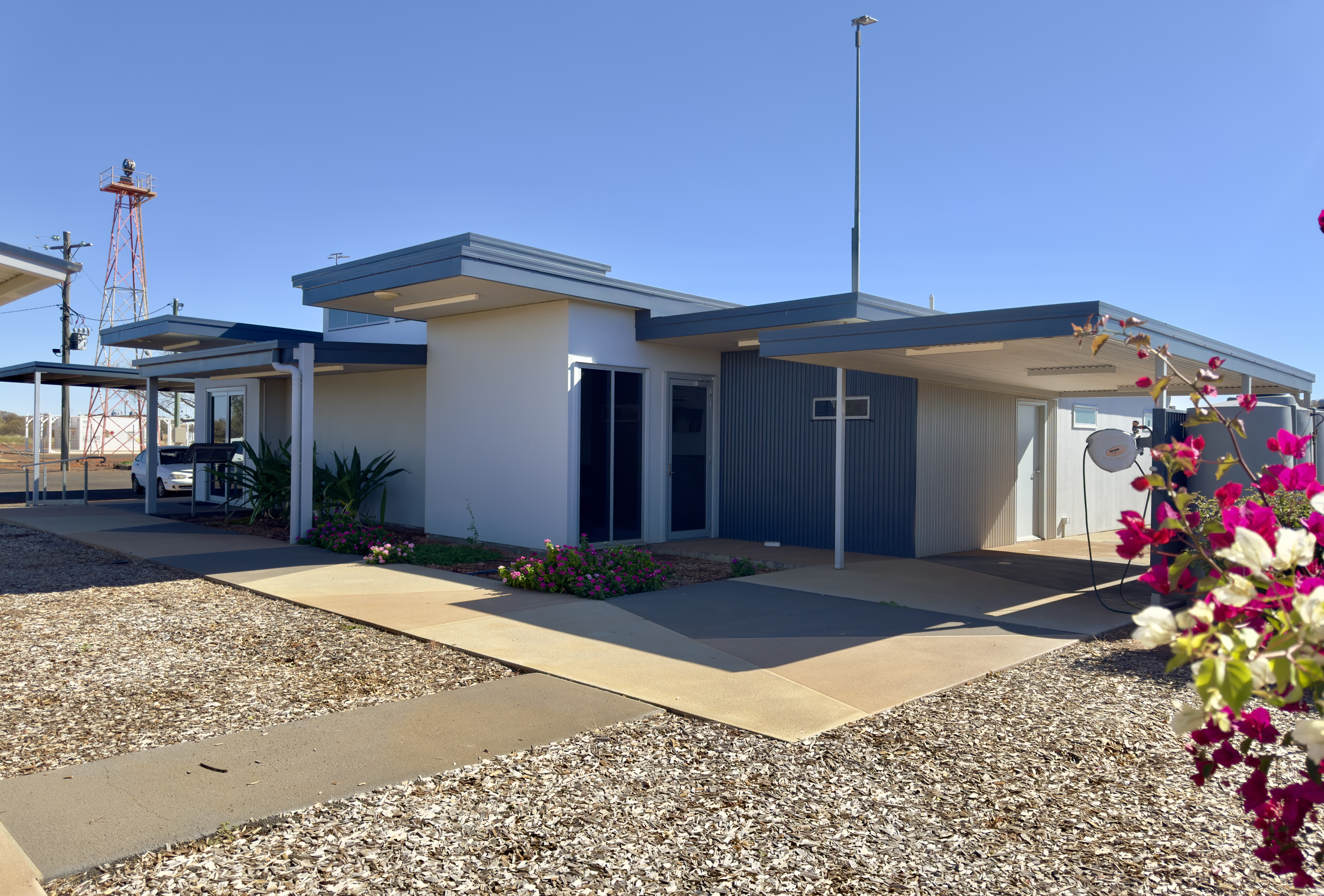
- IATA: ULP; ICAO: YQLP

Summary
- Airport type: Public
- Operator: Quilpie Shire Council
- Serves: Quilpie, Queensland, Australia
- Elevation AMSL: 655 ft / 200 m
- Coordinates: 26°36′33.7″S 144°15′27.7″E

Map
- Location in Queensland

Runways
| Direction | Length | | Surface |
| Direction | m | ft | Surface |
|---|---|---|---|
| 09/27 | 1,493 | 4,898 | Composite |
| 18/36 | 1,070 | 3,510 | Clay |
- Sources: Australian AIP and aerodrome chart

Quilpie Airport (IATA: ULP, ICAO: YQLP) is an airport serving Quilpie, Queensland, Australia. It is located 1 nautical mile (1.9 km; 1.2 mi) west of Quilpie and operated by the Quilpie Shire Council. The airport received $242,666 for security upgrades from the Australian Government in 2006. The new Quilpie Airport Terminal opened in May 2018.

== Facilities ==
The airport is at an elevation of 655 ft (200 m) above sea level. It has two runways: 09/27 with a composite surface measuring 1,493 m × 30 m (4,898 ft × 98 ft) and 18/36 with a clay surface measuring 1,070 m × 30 m (3,510 ft × 98 ft).

== Airlines and destinations ==
| Airlines | Destinations |
|---|---|
| Rex Airlines | Bedourie, Birdsville, Boulia, Brisbane, Charleville, Mount Isa, Toowoomba, Windorah |

Services are operated under contract to the Government of Queensland and were taken over by Regional Express Airlines from 1 January 2015.

== See also ==
- List of airports in Queensland
