= Boulia Airport =

- IATA: BQL; ICAO: YBOU

Summary
- Airport type: Public
- Operator: Boulia Shire Council
- Location: Boulia, Queensland
- Elevation AMSL: 542 ft (165 m)
- Coordinates: 22°54′45″S 139°54′03″E

Map
- Location in Queensland

Runways
Direction	Length		Surface
Direction	m	ft	Surface
14/32	1,801	5,909	Paved
- Sources: Australian AIP and aerodrome chart

Boulia Airport (IATA: BQL, ICAO: YBOU) is an airport in Boulia, Queensland, Australia.

== Airlines and destinations ==
Airlines	Destinations
Rex Airlines	Bedourie, Birdsville, Brisbane, Charleville, Mount Isa, Quilpie, Toowoomba, Windorah

Regular services operated by Regional Express Airlines are under contract to the Government of Queensland.

== See also ==
- List of airports in Queensland
