= Brisbane Airport =

International airport serving Brisbane, Queensland, Australia

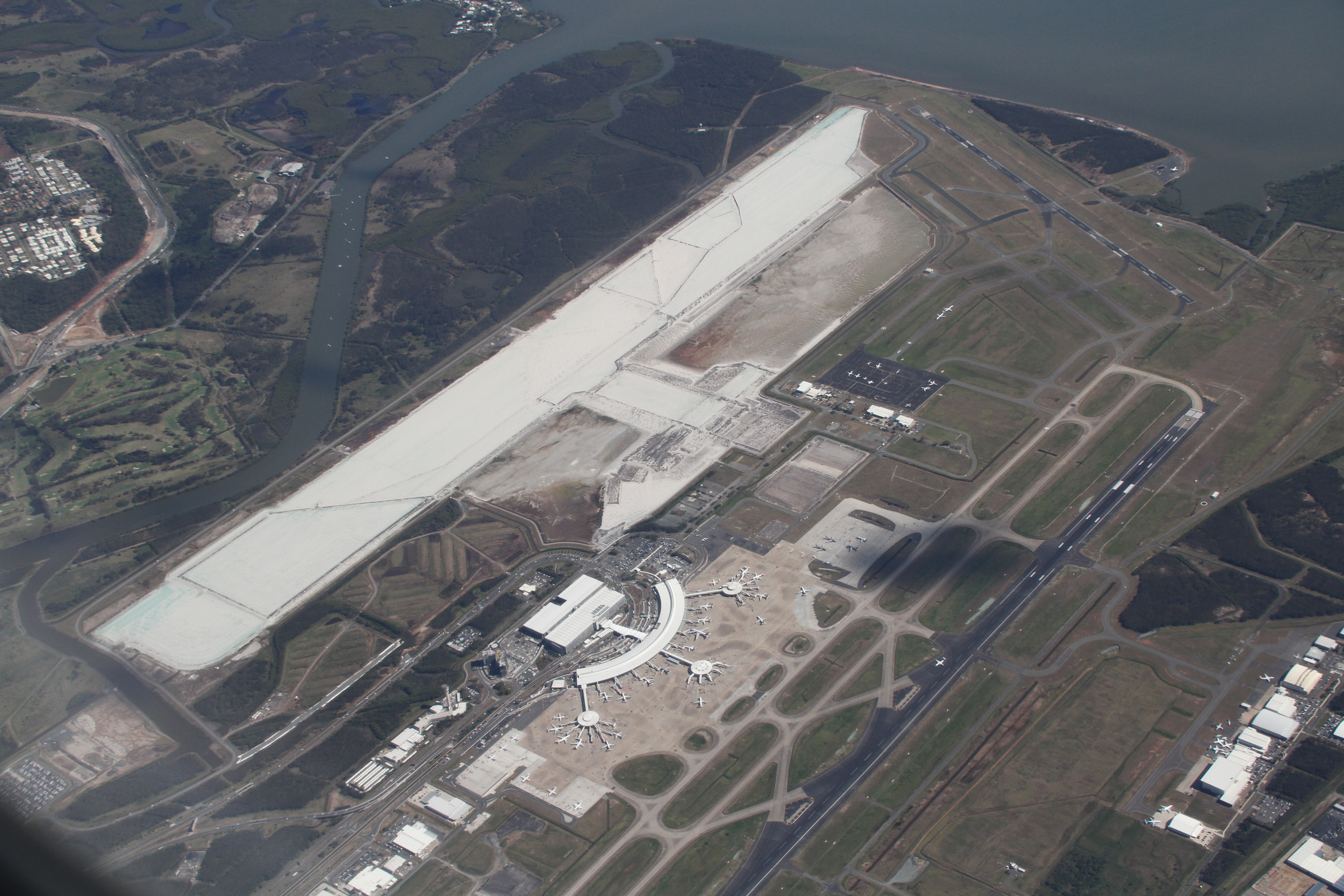
- Brisbane Airport in 2016, with runway 01L/19R under construction
- IATA: BNE; ICAO: YBBN; WMO: 94578

Summary
- Airport type: Public
- Owner/Operator: Brisbane Airport Corporation
- Serves: South East Queensland
- Location: Brisbane Airport, Queensland, Australia
- Opened: 19 March 1988; 38 years ago
- Hub for: ASL Airlines Australia; Qantas; Virgin Australia
- Operating base for: Alliance Airlines; Jetstar; Rex Airlines; Royal Flying Doctor Service
- Elevation AMSL: 15 ft (4.6 m)
- Coordinates: 27°23′00″S 153°07′06″E
- Website: www.bne.com.au

Map
- Interactive map of Brisbane Airport

Runways
Direction	Length		Surface
Direction	m	ft	Surface
01L/19R	3,300	10,827	Asphalt
01R/19L	3,560	11,680	Asphalt

Statistics (2024)
- Passengers: 22,234,133
- Aircraft movements: 218,010
- Economic impact (2012): A$7.3 billion
- Sources: AIP, the Australian Government and Airservices Australia.

Brisbane Airport (IATA: BNE, ICAO: YBBN) is an international airport serving Brisbane, Queensland, Australia. The airport services 31 airlines flying to 50 domestic and 29 international destinations, amounting to over 23 million passengers who travelled through the airport in 2024. In 2016, it was named as the fifth-best performing airport in the world for on-time performance, with 87% of arrivals and departures occurring within 15 minutes of their scheduled times. It covers an area of 2,700 hectares (6,700 acres), making the airport one of the largest by land area in Australia.

Brisbane Airport is a hub for both Qantas and Virgin Australia as well as an operating base for numerous airlines including Jetstar, having the third highest number of domestic connections in Australia after Sydney and Melbourne, followed by Adelaide. It is also home to line-maintenance facilities for Qantas' Airbus A330 and Boeing 737 fleet, Virgin Australia's Boeing 737 fleet, as well as Alliance Airlines, and QantasLink. The airport has dedicated, domestic, international, cargo, and general aviation terminals, as well as two runways.

There are several operators of emergency medical retrieval and rescue services based at the airport including LifeFlight Australia and AVCAIR, the Royal Flying Doctor Service also has one of its nine Queensland bases at Brisbane Airport. Defunct airlines JetGo and Tigerair Australia also operated from Brisbane Airport until their demises in 2018 and 2020, respectively.

== History ==
=== Eagle Farm Airport ===
Brisbane's first airport was Eagle Farm Airport that was built in 1925 on former agricultural land in the suburb of Eagle Farm located 6 km (3.7 mi) north-east of the Brisbane central business district, 5 km (3.1 mi) south-west of Brisbane Airport's Domestic Terminal. Although Qantas started operations there in 1926, most of the flights in Brisbane operated at the Archerfield Airport, which contained a superior landing surface. While in operation, Charles Kingsford Smith landed at Eagle Farm on 9 June 1928, after completing the first trans-pacific flight in his Fokker F.VII, the Southern Cross. There is now a museum containing the original aircraft, along with a memorial located within the Brisbane Airport precinct.

During World War II, Brisbane was the headquarters of the Supreme Commander of Allied forces in the South West Pacific Area, General Douglas MacArthur. The United States Armed Forces upgraded the airfield (Eagle Farm Airport) to cater for military flights, bringing it to such a standard that it became the main civilian airport for the city.

By the 1960s, the facilities at Eagle Farm Airport were inadequate for a city of Brisbane's size and anticipated growth. Many long-haul international services to Asia were required to make an en route stop (e.g., at Darwin), disadvantaging the city to lure prospective carriers and business opportunities.

Some of the infrastructure at Eagle Farm Airport was incorporated into today's Brisbane Airport. For example, the north-east end of the main runway (04/22) survives as taxiway Papa of the present airport, while the Eagle Farm international terminal is now the Brisbane Airport cargo terminal. The final flight from the Eagle Farm Airport departed on 20 March 1988.

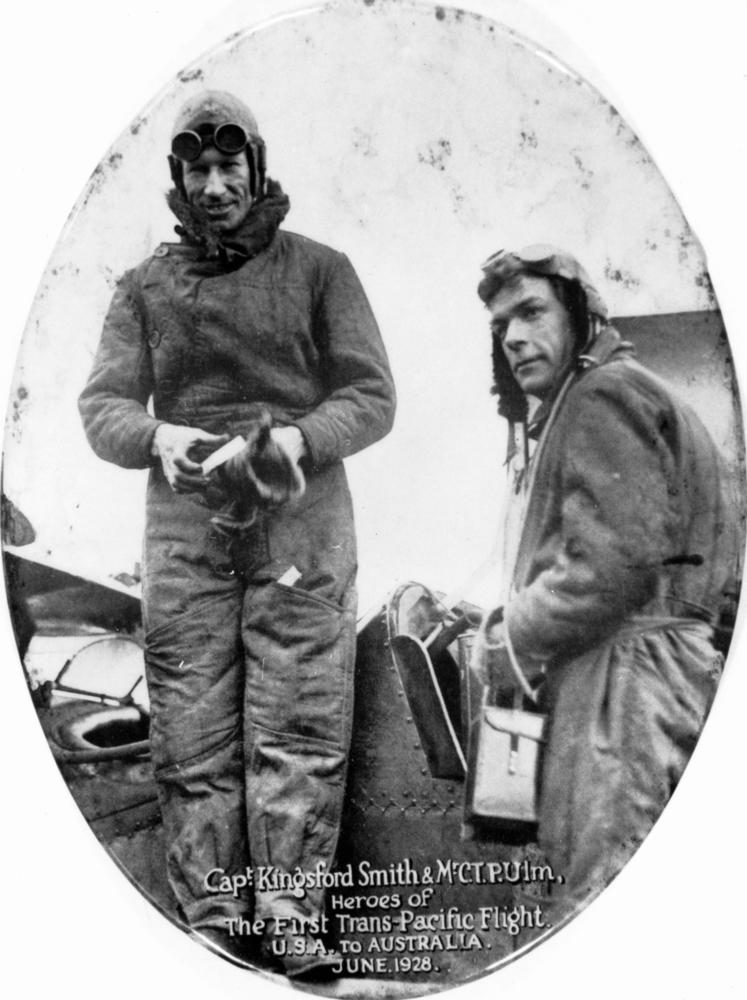
Charles Kingsford Smith and Charles Ulm, first trans-Pacific flight, June 1928

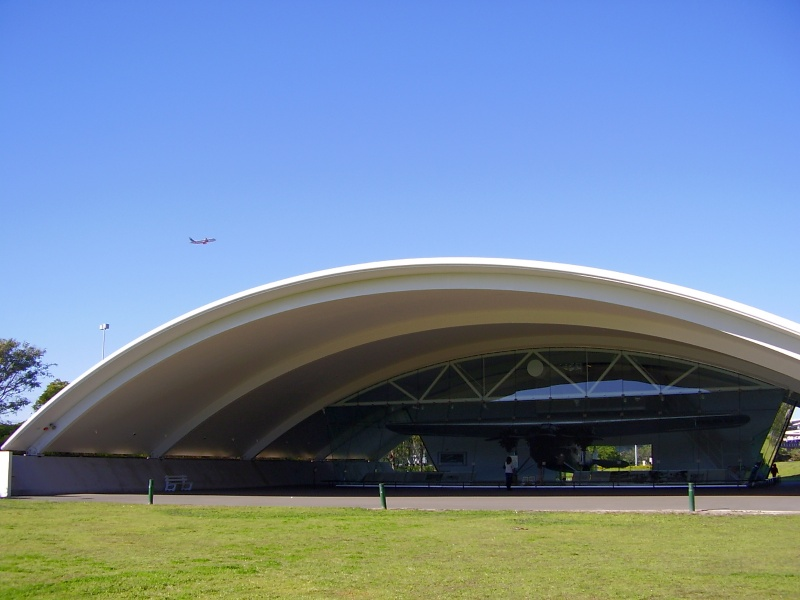
The Kingsford Smith Memorial, housing the Southern Cross

=== 1988 opening ===
The Federal Government announced the construction of Brisbane Airport to be built immediately north east of Eagle Farm Airport. Construction commenced in June 1980. The new airport was built by Barclay Brothers at a cost of $400 million and opened on 19 March 1988, with a new domestic terminal and two runways. The opening was hosted by Prime Minister Bob Hawke. The new airport was built on the former Brisbane residential suburb of Cribb Island that was demolished to make way for the airport. Large amounts of sand were pumped from nearby Moreton Bay to raise the swamp land above the tidal range.

The 1988 facilities included: a domestic terminal; state-of-the-art maintenance facilities; freight apron at the existing passenger terminal; two runways (3,500 m (11,483 ft) and 1,700 m (5,577 ft)) with parallel taxiway systems (cater for Code F+ aircraft); access roads; parking facilities and a 75 m (246 ft) tall air traffic control tower.

In September 1995, the international terminal was inaugurated by Prime Minister Paul Keating, and it has been expanded since that time.

=== Privatisation ===
In 1997, as part of the privatisation of numerous Australian airports, the airport was acquired for $1.4 billion from the Federal Airports Corporation by Brisbane Airport Corporation (BAC) under a 50-year lease (with an option to renew for a further 49 years). The original BAC shareholders were Amsterdam Airport Schiphol, Brisbane City Council, Commonwealth Bank and Port of Brisbane Corporation. Since that time, BAC has assumed ultimate responsibility for the operations of Brisbane Airport including all airport infrastructure investment with no government funding. As at January 2024, the major shareholders were Queensland Investment Corporation (29%), Igneo Infrastructure Partners (27%), Amsterdam Airport Schiphol (20%) and IFM Investors (20%). Brisbane Airport is categorised as a Leased Federal Airport.

==== New parallel runway ====
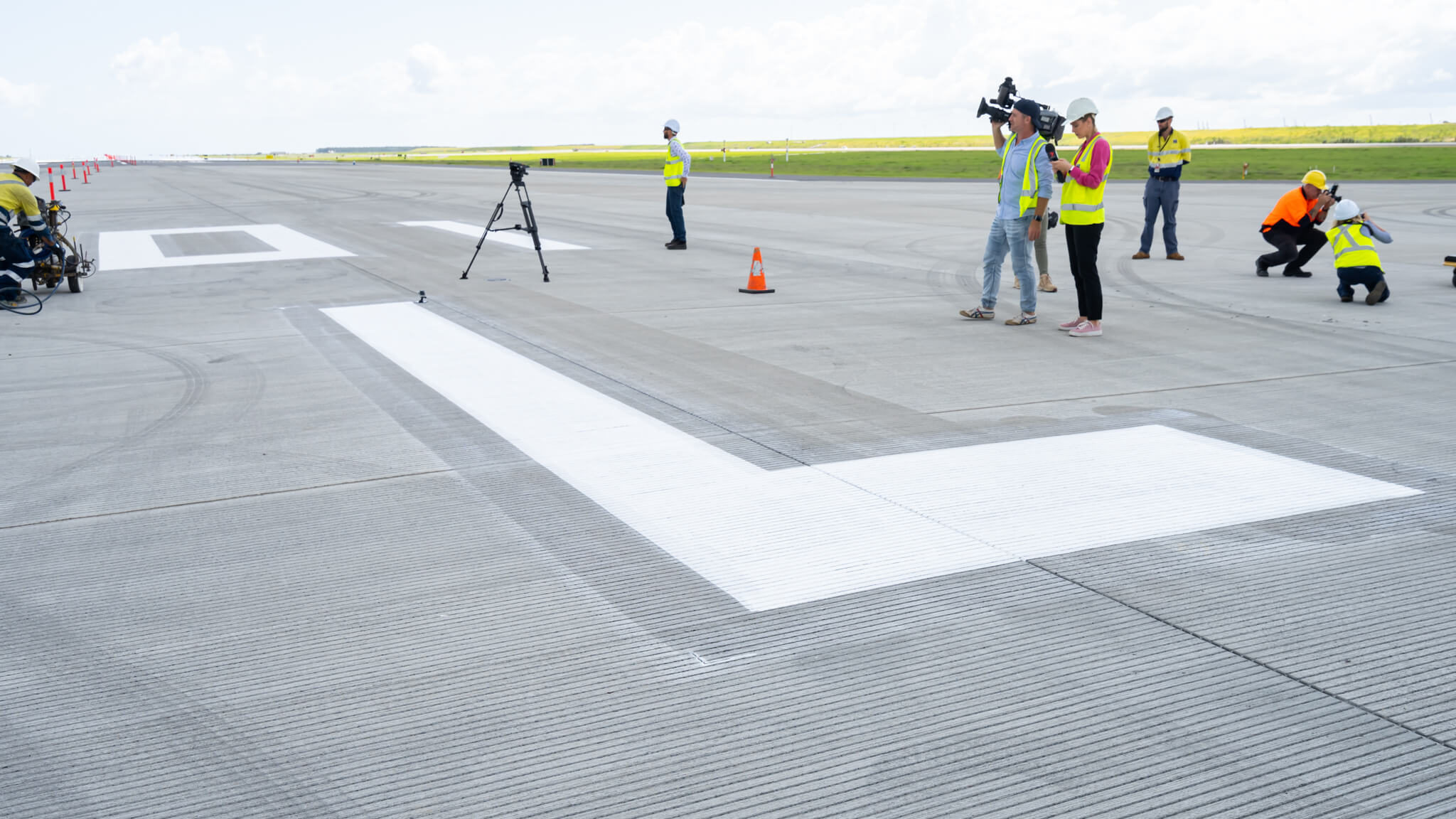
The painting of 01L on the new Brisbane Airport parallel runway

On 18 September 2007, the federal government granted approval for the construction of a new parallel runway. The proposed $1.3 billion, 3,300 m (10,800 ft) runway was expected to take approximately eight years to construct and was constructed on swamp land 2 kilometres (1.2 mi) west of the existing terminal area and parallel to the existing main runway. The long construction period was due to the settling period of the 13,000,000 cubic metres (459,090,667 cu ft) of sand fill dredged from Moreton Bay. In early December 2014 the delivery of 11,000,000 cubic metres (388,461,334 cu ft) of sand to the site was completed. In 2019, asphalting of the second runway had begun and was completed by late 2019, while mid February 2020 saw the start of the line-marking of the runway.

On 30 March 2020, runway 14/32 was decommissioned early as part of Brisbane's new runway 'Operational Readiness & Testing' phase so that the newly decommissioned cross runway could be used for aircraft parking.

In mid-2020, construction of a new runway was completed. Its first flight was operated by Virgin Australia, flight VA781 to Cairns, on 12 July 2020.

== Terminals ==
Brisbane Airport has two passenger terminals.

=== International terminal T1 ===
The international terminal was built in 1995 and has 14 bays with aerobridges, four of these are capable of handling A380s. There are also four layover bays. The terminal has four levels: level 1 houses most airline offices and baggage handlers, level 2 handles arrivals, level 3 houses the departure lounge (airside) and other offices (landside), and level 4 houses departure check-in.

The airport contains an Emirates lounge, the first outside Dubai that has direct access to the A380 aerobridges, and also has Air New Zealand, Qantas, Singapore Airlines, Aspire and Plaza Premium lounges.

There is also a five-storey long term carpark and a smaller short term carpark in close proximity to the terminal.

The international terminal redevelopment began in February 2014. The $45 million redevelopment is designed by Brisbane architectural practices Richards and Spence and Arkhefield. Queensland artists, Sebastian Moody and Mirdidingkingathi Juwarnda Sally Gabori, were commissioned for the artworks.

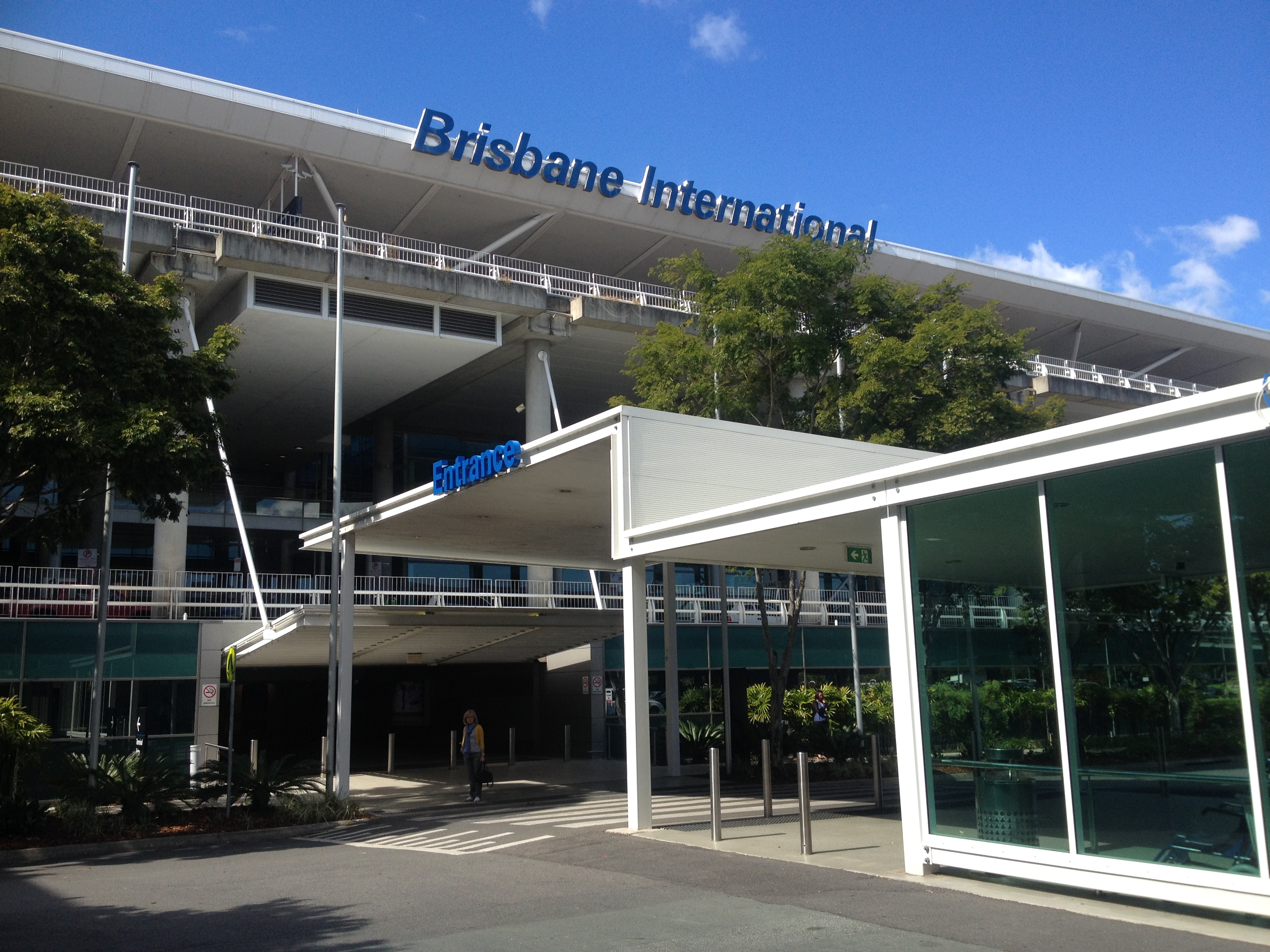
The front of the Brisbane International terminal

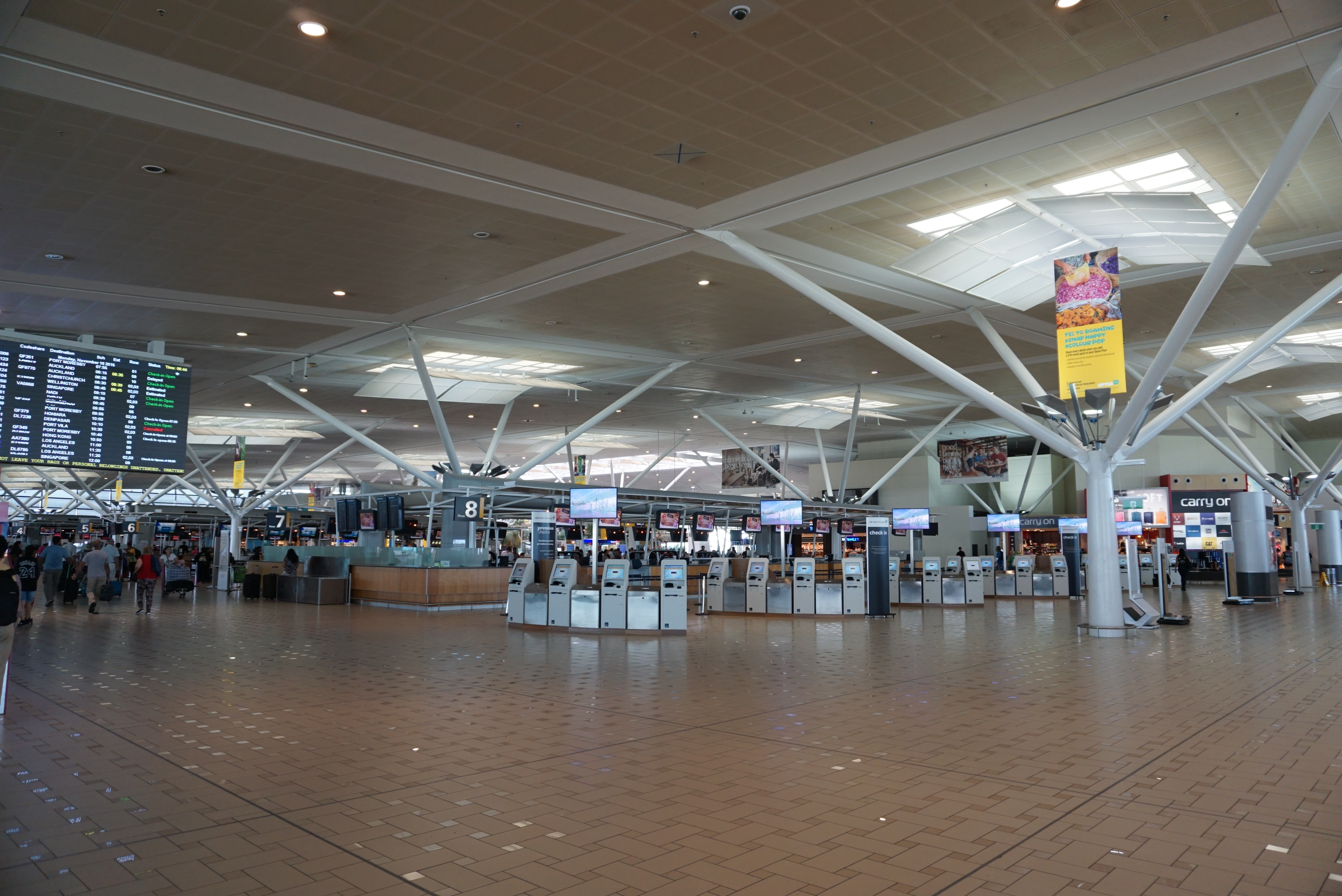
International terminal departures level

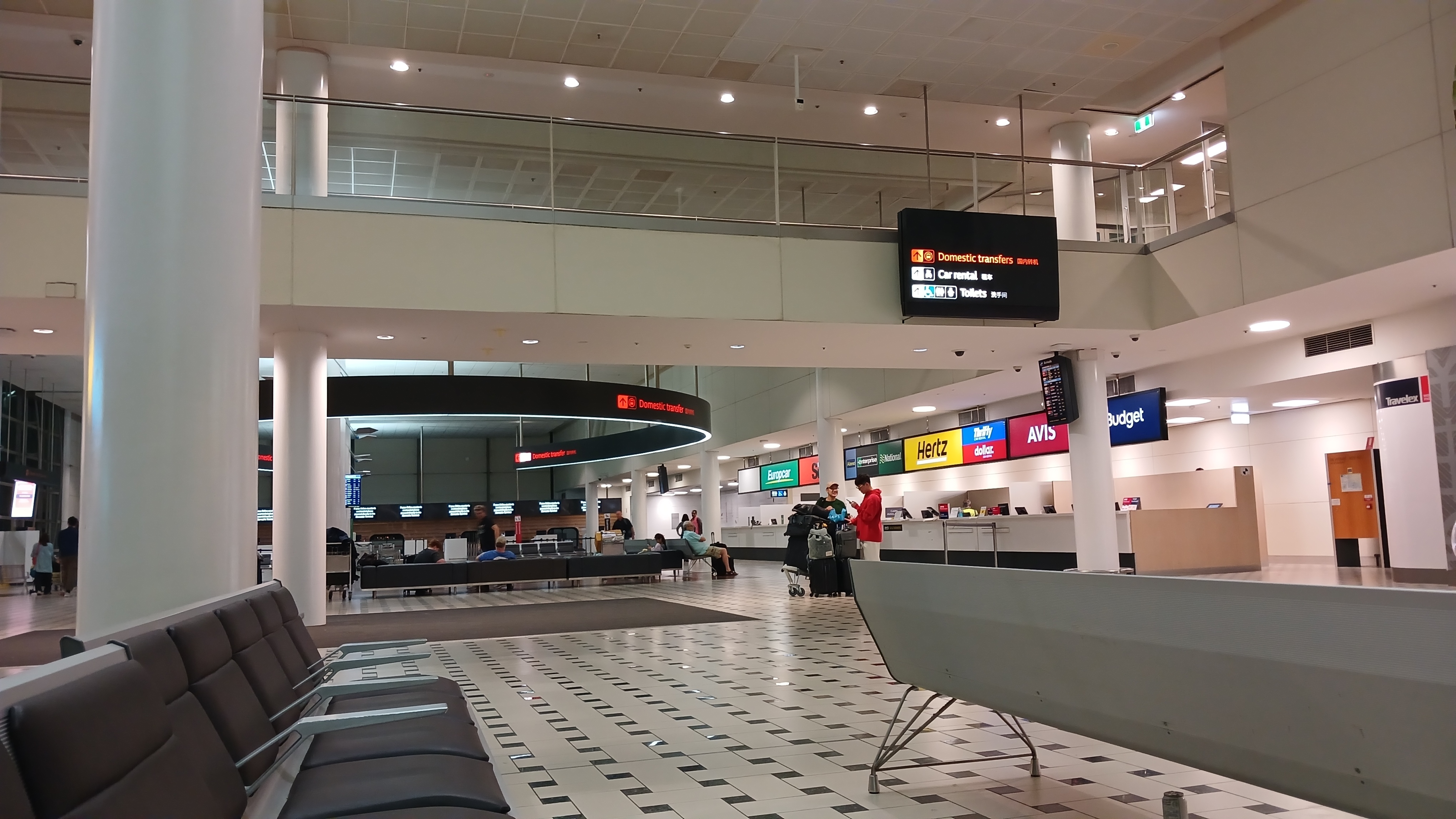
International Terminal arrivals level

=== Domestic terminal T2 ===
Brisbane Airport's domestic terminal is a two-storey curved building with three complete satellite arms extending beyond the building providing additional passenger lounge and gate facilities for airlines.

The domestic terminal has three distinct areas serving Qantas and QantasLink at the northern end of the building and Virgin Australia at the southern end of the building with other carriers such as Jetstar located in the central area of the terminal.

The Qantas concourse has nine bays served by aerobridges including one served by a dual bridge. It has three lounges – The Qantas Club, Business Class and Chairman's Lounge. Virgin Australia occupies what was previously the Ansett Australia end of the terminal. Its concourse has 11 parking bays, nine of which are served by aerobridges including two served by a dual bridge. It has two lounges – the Virgin Australia Lounge which is located in the former Golden Wing Club opposite Gate 41 and the Beyond Lounge.

Remote bays are located to the north and south of the building (serving non-jet aircraft), and in the central area (serving jet aircraft).

On 27 February 2014, Qantas announced it had disposed of its long-term lease (signed in 1987) at the domestic terminal which was due to expire on 30 December 2018. Under the new arrangements, Qantas retains exclusive use and operational control over much of the northern end of the terminal until the end of 2018 while securing rights to key infrastructure beyond this period.

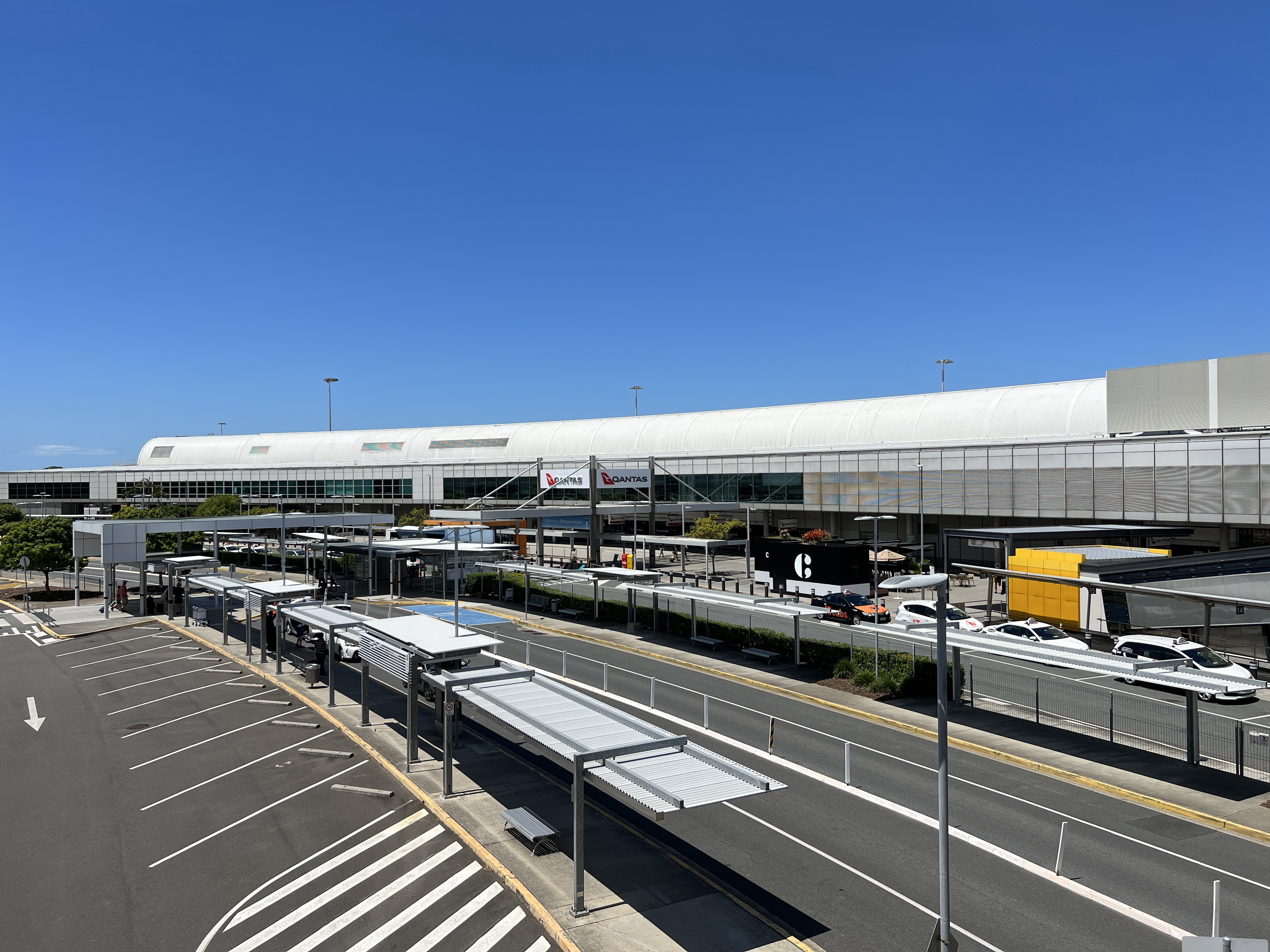
Front of the northern side of the domestic terminal

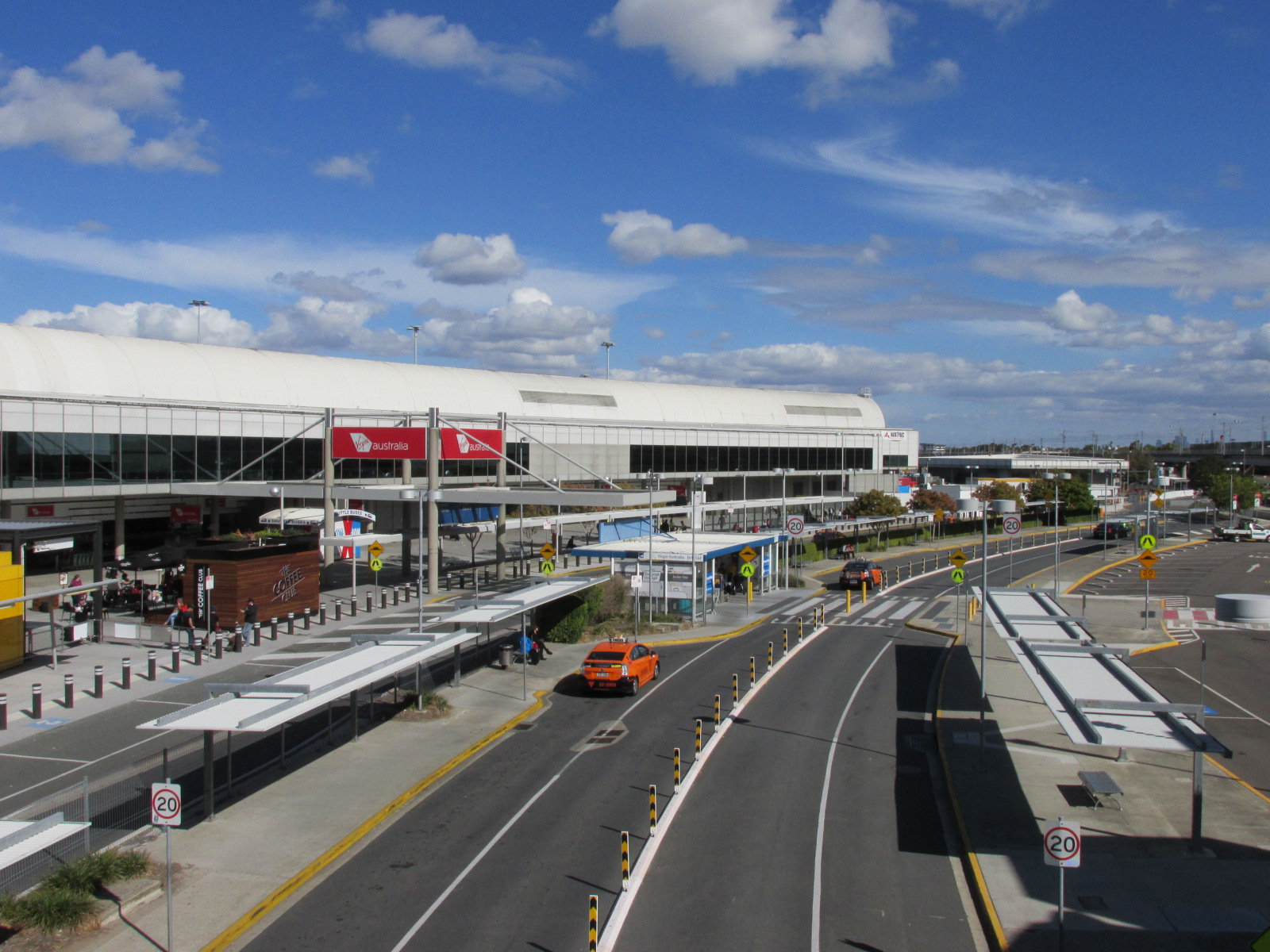
Front of the southern side of the domestic terminal

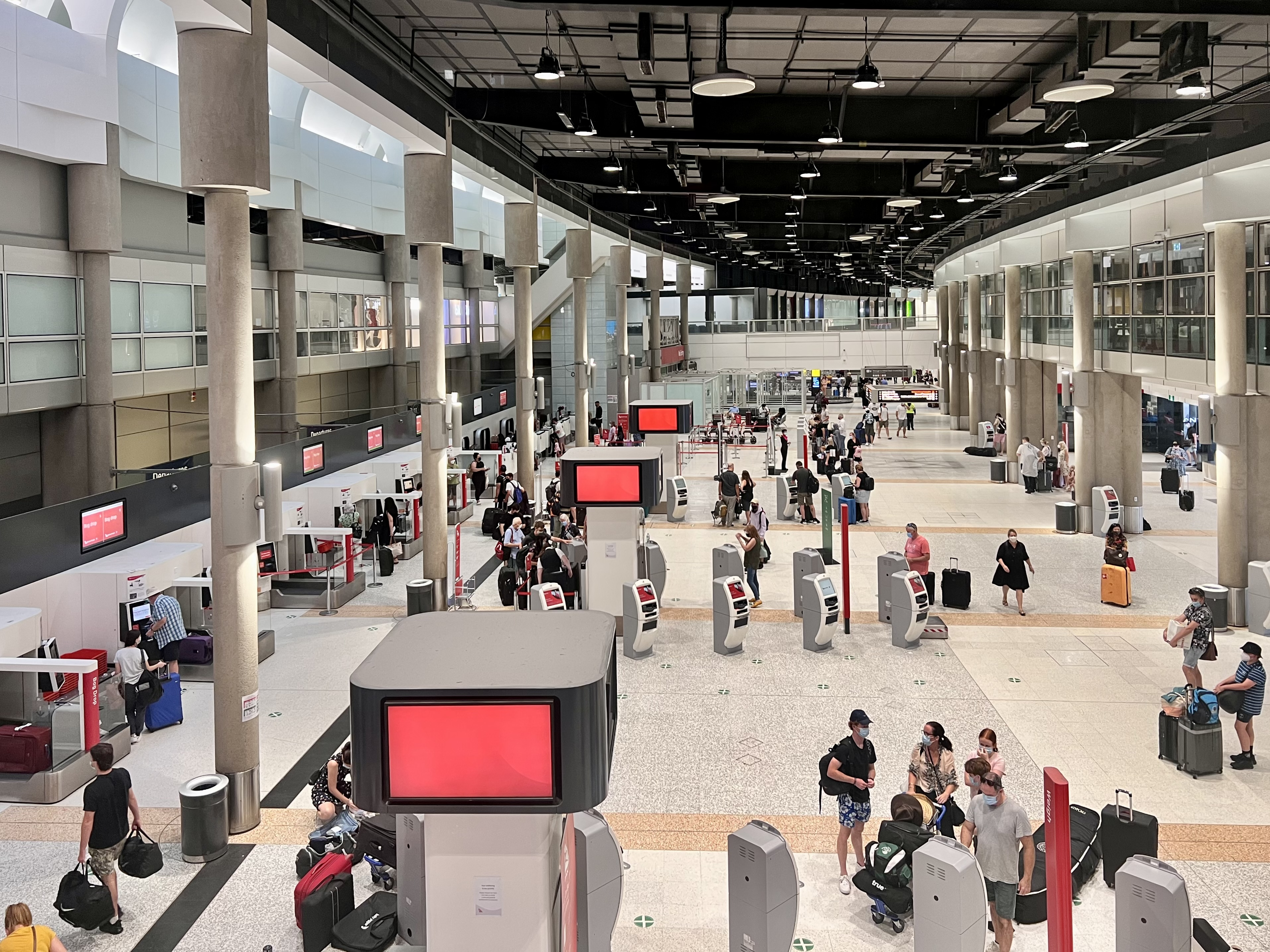
Domestic terminal interior

=== Future third terminal ===
As early as November 2022, the size, location, and design of Terminal 3 was under discussion, which would be situated between the two runways. This was also included in the Brisbane Airport Master Plan 2020. As of September 2024, plans had begun for a terminal three development. The third terminal will reportedly service both domestic and international flights. It is projected to be opened by the 2030s to accommodate the future demands of population growth.

=== AVCAIR FBO & VIP Lounge and Brisbane Jet Base ===
Brisbane has two FBO Lounge and Operation Facilities, located on the North Apron (Brisbane Jet Base) and South Logistics Apron (AVCAIR FBO) of Brisbane Airport. The AVCAIR facility handles VIP and FIFO (fly-in fly-out) movements including Ad hoc Military, Medical and Charter flights and offers direct airside access for VIP movements.

== Airlines and destinations ==
=== Passenger ===
Airlines	Destinations
Air Canada	Vancouver
Air New Zealand	Auckland, Christchurch, Wellington; Seasonal: Queenstown
Air Niugini	Port Moresby
Aircalin	Nouméa
Alliance Airlines	Moranbah, Weipa; Charter: Ballera, Cloncurry, Emerald, Mackay, Moomba, Mount Isa, Rockhampton, Roma, Sunshine Coast, The Granites
American Airlines	Seasonal: Dallas/Fort Worth
Batik Air Malaysia	Denpasar, Kuala Lumpur–International
Cathay Pacific	Hong Kong
China Airlines	Auckland, Taipei–Taoyuan
China Eastern Airlines	Shanghai–Pudong
China Southern Airlines	Guangzhou
Delta Air Lines	Seasonal: Los Angeles
Emirates	Dubai–International
EVA Air	Taipei–Taoyuan
Fiji Airways	Nadi
Jetstar	Adelaide, Auckland, Avalon, Bangkok–Suvarnabhumi, Cairns, Canberra, Darwin, Denpasar, Hobart, Launceston, Melbourne, Newcastle, Osaka–Kansai, Perth, Proserpine, Rarotonga, Seoul–Incheon, Sydney–Kingsford Smith, Sydney–Western, Tokyo–Narita, Townsville; Seasonal: Cebu, Queenstown
Korean Air	Seoul–Incheon
Link Airways	Armidale, Biloela/Thangool, Bundaberg, Coffs Harbour, Dubbo, Inverell, Narrabri, Orange, Tamworth
Malaysia Airlines	Kuala Lumpur–International
National Jet Express	Charter: Emerald, Moranbah, Orange, Rockhampton
Nauru Airlines	Koror, Majuro, Nauru, Pohnpei, Tarawa
Nexus Airlines	Charter: Moranbah
Philippine Airlines	Manila
Qantas	Apia–Faleolo, Auckland, Cairns, Christchurch, Darwin, Denpasar (begins 1 August 2027), Koror, Los Angeles, Mackay, Manila, Melbourne, Mount Isa, Norfolk Island, Perth, Port Moresby, Port Vila, Queenstown, Singapore, Sydney–Kingsford Smith, Tokyo–Narita, Townsville, Wellington
QantasLink	Adelaide, Albury, Alice Springs, Barcaldine, Blackall, Bundaberg, Cairns, Canberra, Emerald, Gladstone, Hamilton Island, Hervey Bay, Hobart, Honiara, Longreach, Mackay, Melbourne, Miles, Moranbah, Mount Isa, Newcastle, Nouméa, Port Macquarie, Rockhampton, Sydney–Western (begins 28 March 2027), Townsville, Wagga Wagga, Wellington; Seasonal: Launceston
Qatar Airways	Auckland (begins 26 June 2027), Doha
Rex Airlines	Bedourie, Birdsville, Boulia, Coffs Harbour, Charleville, Cunnamulla, Mount Isa, Quilpie, Roma, St George, Thargomindah, Toowoomba, Windorah
Singapore Airlines	Singapore
Skytrans Australia	Charter: Kens Bore, Wodgina
Solomon Airlines	Auckland, Honiara, Luganville, Munda, Port Vila
United Airlines	San Francisco
VietJet Air	Ho Chi Minh City
Virgin Australia	Adelaide, Ayers, Cairns, Canberra, Darwin, Denpasar, Doha, Emerald, Gladstone, Hamilton Island, Hobart, Launceston, Mackay, Melbourne, Mount Isa, Nadi, Newcastle, Perth, Port Vila, Proserpine, Queenstown, Rockhampton, Sydney–Kingsford Smith, Townsville; Charter: Boolgeeda

Qantas operates dedicated 'flightseeing' services over Antarctica from Brisbane, with Boeing 787 Dreamliner aircraft. Departing Brisbane from the Domestic Terminal and providing a guided aerial tour of Antarctica before returning to Australia, these flights are about thirteen hours in total.

=== Cargo ===
Airlines	Destinations
Cathay Cargo	Hong Kong
Hong Kong Air Cargo	Hong Kong
Nauru Airlines	Honiara, Nauru
Qantas Freight	Cairns, Melbourne, Sydney–Western Townsville
Team Global Express	Adelaide, Biloela/Thangool, Mackay, Melbourne, Perth, Rockhampton, Sydney–Bankstown, Sydney–Kingsford Smith, Townsville

== Statistics ==
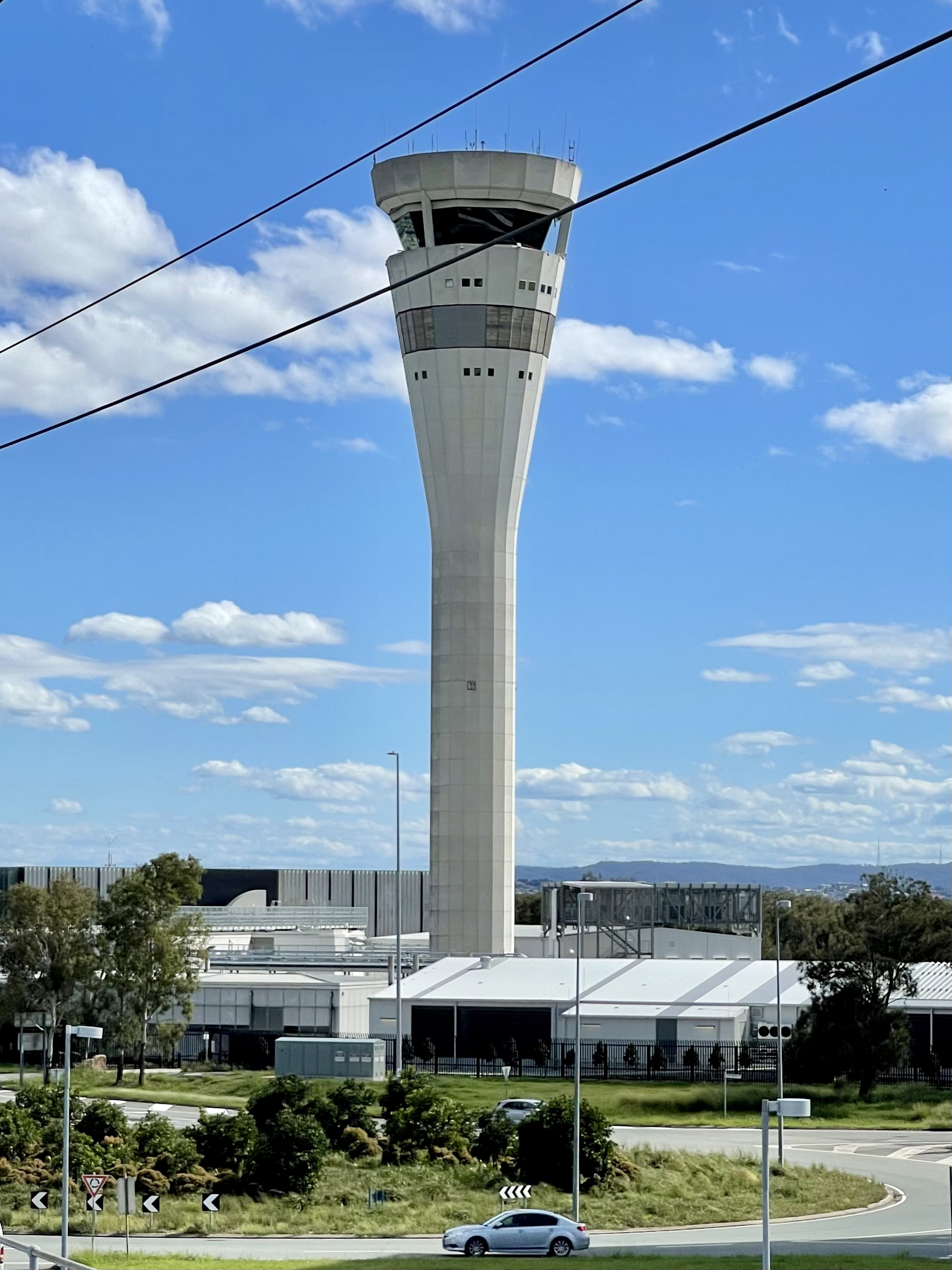
Control tower

Brisbane Airport's annual passenger numbers were 23.1 million in 2017. This is expected to grow to around 50 million by 2035.

=== Total annual passengers ===
Annual passenger statistics for Brisbane Airport
Year	Domestic	International	Total	Change
1986	3,018,951	576,663	3,595,614	▲8.4%
1987	3,271,701	697,453	3,969,154	▲10.4%
1988	3,941,211	958,795	4,900,006	▲23.5%
1989	2,905,041	946,067	3,851,108	▼ –21.4%
1990	3,766,974	1,062,737	4,829,711	▲25.4%
1991	5,013,256	1,202,170	6,215,426	▲28.7%
1992	5,225,948	1,312,949	6,538,887	▲5.2%
1993	5,611,900	1,542,211	7,154,111	▲9.4%
1994	6,385,682	1,686,327	8,071,739	▲12.8%
1995	6,924,291	1,965,327	8,889,618	▲10.1%
1996	7,375,444	2,192,110	9,567,544	▲7.6%
1997	7,470,083	2,294,900	9,764,983	▲2.1%
1998	7,438,341	2,251,240	9,689,581	▼ –0.8%
1999	7,833,436	2,375,767	10,209,203	▲5.4%
2000	8,810,670	2,461,378	11,272,048	▲10.4%
2001	9,946,073	2,547,720	12,493,793	▲10.8%
2002	9,163,520	2,493,082	11,656,602	▼ –6.7%
2003	10,105,366	2,549,444	12,654,810	▲8.6%
2004	11,519,422	3,266,481	14,785,903	▲16.8%
2005	12,102,609	3,606,690	15,709,299	▲6.2%
2006	12,942,735	3,763,314	16,706,049	▲6.3%
2007	13,972,336	3,921,752	17,894,088	▲7.1%
2008	14,547,537	4,035,790	18,583,327	▲3.9%
2009	14,595,924	4,117,171	18,713,095	▲0.7%
2010	15,338,191	4,282,257	19,620,448	▲4.8%
2011	15,888,983	4,444,867	20,333,850	▲3.6%
2012	16,601,349	4,471,413	21,072,762	▲3.6%
2013	16,775,697	4,669,141	21,444,838	▲1.8%
2014	16,982,836	4,964,981	21,947,817	▲2.3%
2015	16,786,974	5,238,522	22,025,496	▲0.4%
2016	17,055,852	5,449,744	22,505,596	▲2.2%
2017	17,219,926	5,729,341	22,949,267	▲2.0%
2018	17,354,529	6,112,234	23,466,763	▲2.3%
2019	17,580,142	6,425,564	24,005,706	▲2.3%
2020	6,386,797	1,388,291	7,775,088	▼ –67.6%
2021	7,658,654	247,999	7,906,653	▲1.7%
2022	14,374,443	2,531,254	16,905,697	▲113.8%
2023	16,343,097	4,845,468	21,188,565	▲25.3%
2024	17,106,783	6,146,538	23,253,321	▲9.7%

=== Domestic ===
Busiest domestic routes – Brisbane Airport (year ending 31 December 2022)
Rank	Airport	Passengers	% change
1	Sydney	3,594,184	▲228.8%
2	Melbourne	2,806,475	▲256.4%
3	Cairns	1,136,610	▲12.3%
4	Townsville	818,348	▲18.8%
5	Perth	737,276	▲156.7%
6	Adelaide	713,245	▲58.0%
7	Mackay	698,398	▲30.2%
8	Canberra	593,364	▲102.7%
9	Newcastle	450,206	▲112.0%
10	Rockhampton	443,074	▲22.6%
11	Darwin	328,808	▲26.2%
12	Proserpine	293,453	▲20.2%
13	Hobart	291,200	▲13.1%
14	Gladstone	193,074	▲37.8%
15	Hamilton Island	174,989	▼ -14.7%

=== International ===
Busiest international routes – Brisbane Airport (year ending 31 Dec 2025)
Rank	Airport	Passengers	% change	Airlines
1	Singapore	975,468	▲12.0%	Qantas, Singapore Airlines
2	Auckland	930,976	▲1.7%	Air New Zealand, China Airlines, Jetstar, Qantas
3	Dubai	477,955	▼2.7%	Emirates
4	Denpasar	444,056	▼1.7%	Batik Air Malaysia, Jetstar, Virgin Australia
5	Tokyo-Narita	375,736	▲5.2%	Jetstar, Qantas
7	Doha	341,040	▲45.6%	Qatar Airways
7	Hong Kong	295,554	▲47.5%	Cathay Pacific
8	Nadi	265,240	▲3.2%	Fiji Airways, Virgin Australia
9	Christchurch	227,162	▲6.3%	Air New Zealand, Qantas
10	Guangzhou	206,083	▲36.9%	China Southern Airlines
11	Taipei	201,545	▲6.4%	China Airlines, EVA Air
12	Seoul	188,197	▲2.2%	Jetstar, Korean Air
13	Wellington	185,119	▲5.2%	Air New Zealand, QantasLink
14	Queenstown	184,158	▲20.9%	Qantas, Virgin Australia
15	Port Moresby	177,801	▲9.8%	Air Niugini, Qantas

== Ground transport ==
=== Road ===
Brisbane Airport has four car parks, all operating 24 hours a day, 7 days a week. There are two multi-level undercover car parks, the international, providing short- and long-term services, and the domestic also provides long- and short-term parking. Qantas and Virgin Australia also offer valet parking at the domestic terminal only. Total car spaces number 9,000.

==== Upgrades ====
In 2009, to help relieve congestion between Brisbane CBD and the airport, the BrisConnections consortium was formed between Queensland Government, Brisbane City Council, and a Thiess/John Holland/Macquarie Bank to build the Airport Link road project. It included the longest tunnel in Australia at the time of construction (over 8 km (5.0 mi); 6 lanes) from the interchange between the Inner City Bypass and Clem Jones Tunnel (the second-longest tunnel in Australia when the Airport Link opened) to the Airport Flyover over an improved Southern Cross Way Overpass which leads on to Airport Drive, cutting 16 sets of traffic lights. It was completed in mid-2012.

The Northern Access Road project, completed in December 2009, significantly reduces traffic congestion on Airport Drive. Moreton Drive, the 5 km (3.1 mi), multi-lane road network, linking Gateway Motorway with the airport terminals, provides airport users with a second major access route to terminals and on-airport businesses.

=== Public transport ===
==== Rail ====
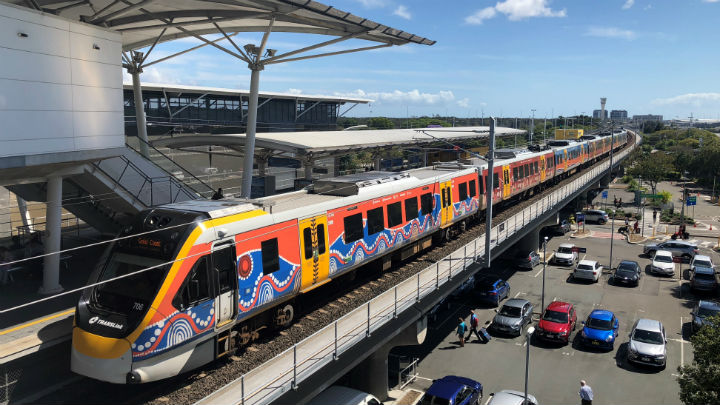
The Airport line travels direct from each terminal to Brisbane and the Gold Coast.

The airport has two railway stations as part of a privately owned airport rail line. The International Airport railway station is elevated and located next to the international terminal, as is the Domestic Airport railway station. Both stations are privately owned and operated by the Airtrain Citylink consortium. As a result, fares are more expensive than a regular suburban ticket, though less than half the taxi fare. The Airtrain Citylink travels via the Queensland Rail network to Fortitude Valley and the Brisbane CBD, with most trains continuing to the Gold Coast via South Bank.

==== Bus ====
There is a free inter-terminal bus connecting the two terminals and the nearby Skygate shopping precinct, DFO and adjacent Novotel Brisbane Airport hotel.

From the Skygate shopping precinct, Translink bus route 590 connects to the rest of Brisbane's public transport system.

=== Cycling and walking ===
Brisbane Airport has cycling and pedestrian connections connecting to the Moreton Bay Bikeway network.

== Future development projects ==
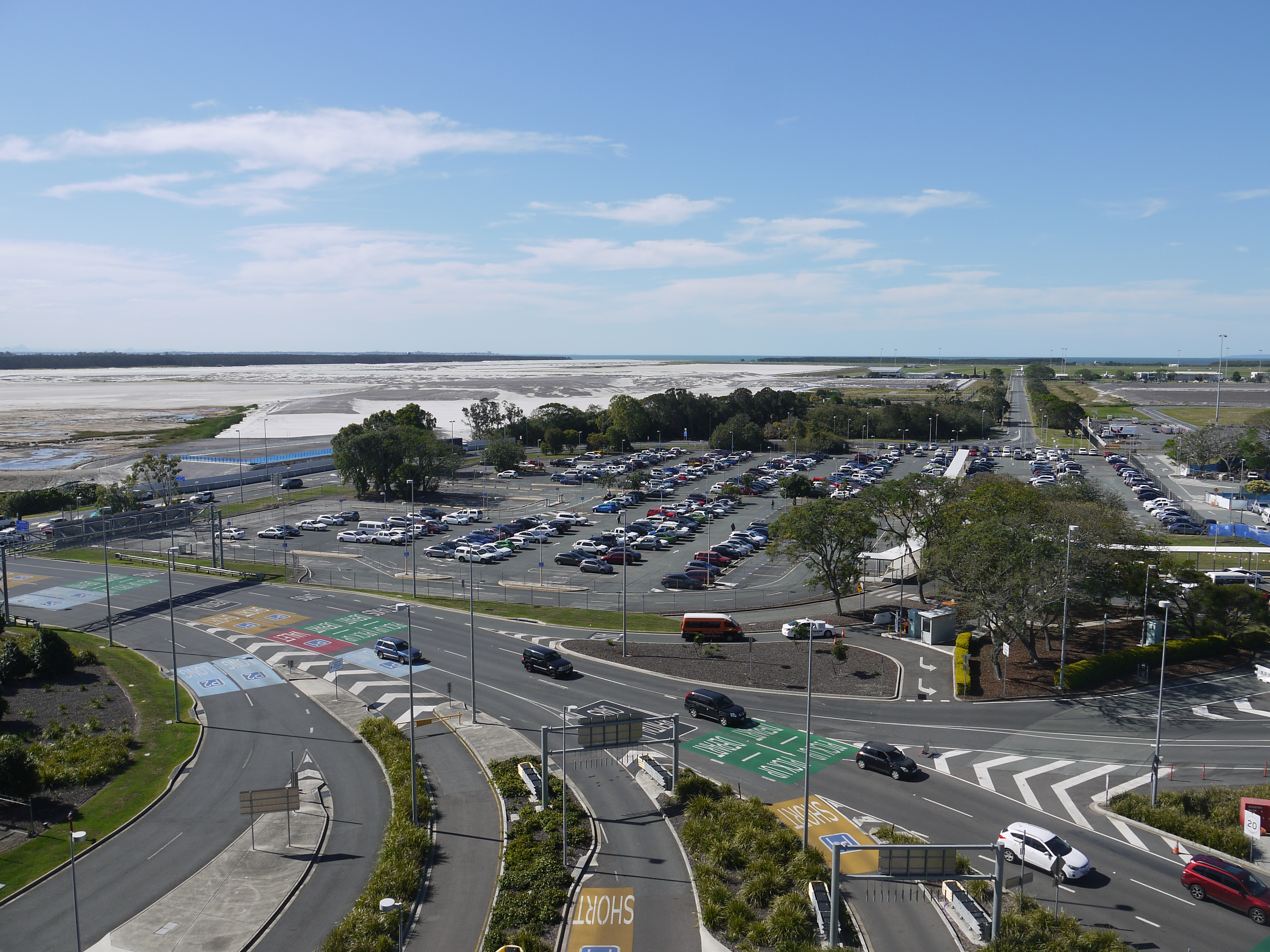
New parallel runway under construction with domestic terminal road approaches in foreground

=== Brisbane Centre ===
The Brisbane FIR consists of New South Wales north of Sydney, all of Queensland, most of the Northern Territory and the northern half of Western Australia. It also contains the Australian Tasman Sea airspace. Brisbane Centre is located adjacent to Brisbane Tower at Brisbane Airport. It also contains Brisbane Approach.

Due to the nature of the airspace it controls, most international flights in and out of Australia (except Indian Ocean flights) come under the Brisbane FIR's jurisdiction, as well as domestic flights operating to and from airports within the zone. From Brisbane Centre, Airservices Australia manages the airspace over the northern half of Australia, representing 5 per cent of the world's total airspace. As only two of eight capitals are located in the Brisbane FIR, it handles a lesser volume of traffic than Melbourne Centre. However, Sydney is on the border of the two FIRs, and thus Brisbane Centre has control of flights arriving or departing in Sydney from the North.

== Awards ==
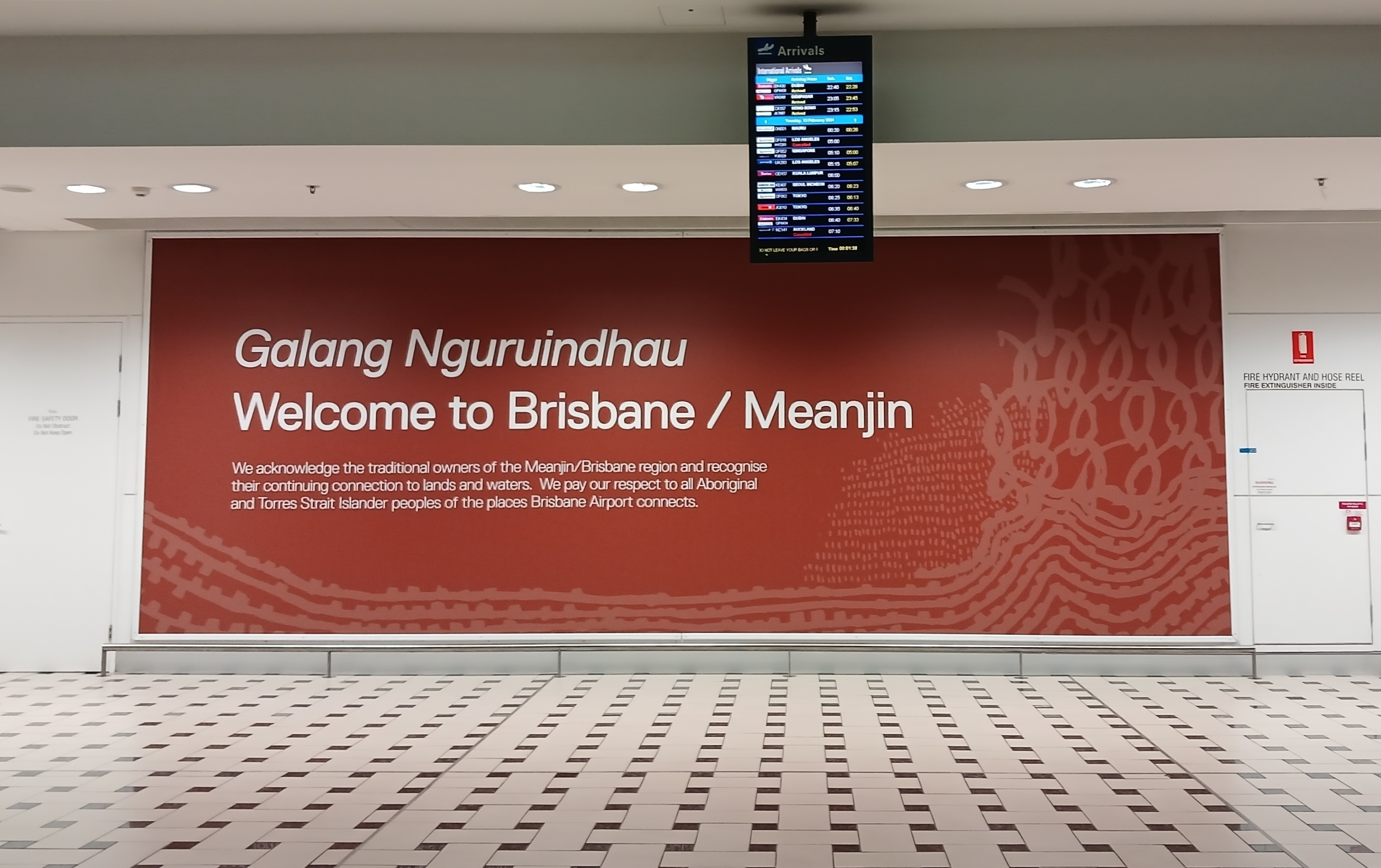
Traditional owners of Brisbane region have been recognised and acknowledged at Brisbane Airport.

Brisbane Airport has won a number of awards, including being rated as Australia's No. 1 airport for quality of service 10 years in a row (2005–2014 inclusive) in a survey by the Australian Competition & Consumer Commission, and being ranked as 3rd Best Airport in the world (for airports servicing between 20 and 30 million passengers per year). In 2015, it was reported as the fourth-best medium-sized airport for on-time arrivals and departures. The international terminal won the Queensland architecture award. In 2005 Brisbane Airport was awarded the IATA Eagle Award, the second of only two Australian airports to receive such an award.

== Accidents and incidents ==
- On 15 February 2012, a Toll Aviation Fairchild Metro III freighter came to rest on its fuselage at about 2:30 am. Neither of the two pilots were injured. The landing gear on the light plane failed to go down during testing after maintenance.
- On 18 July 2018, a Malaysian Airlines Airbus A330 took off from Brisbane with pitot tube covers still in place, resulting in unreliable airspeed indications and the aircraft diverting back to Brisbane. Airport ground staff had placed covers on the pitot tubes to prevent mud wasps nesting in them (a common hazard at Brisbane Airport), and the pilots, engineers and ground staff failed to check the covers were removed prior to departure.
- On 1 July 2022, an Emirates Airbus A380 performing Flight 430 from Dubai landed at Brisbane Airport with a hole on the left side of its fuselage. A missing bolt and cap was found on the aircraft's nose landing gear after it parked. Damage allegedly occurred on takeoff and the pilots reported a blown tire before landing, but investigation is ongoing.

== Notable people ==
- Julieanne Alroe, chief executive officer of Brisbane Airport Corporation July 2009 – June 2018

== See also ==
- Brisbane Airport, a suburb of Brisbane
- List of airports in Queensland
- Transport in Australia
- United States Army Air Forces in Australia (World War II)
