= MacAir Airlines =

Australian regional airline

IATA	ICAO	Call sign
CC	MCK	MACAIR
- Founded: 2000
- Ceased operations: January 2009
- Hubs: Brisbane Airport; Cairns Airport; Townsville Airport
- Fleet size: 10
- Destinations: 29
- Headquarters: Townsville, Queensland, Australia
- Key people: Terry Byrt (Owner)

MacAir Airlines Pty Ltd was a regional airline based in Townsville, Queensland, Australia. It operated scheduled passenger services throughout Queensland from major regional locations, as well as regular and ad hoc charters for the minerals industry in Queensland. Its main operations base was Townsville Airport, with hubs at Cairns, Brisbane and Mount Isa.

In January 2009, the airline was placed in receivership.

== History ==
MacAir Airlines was established and started charter operations in 1992 as McKinlay Air Charters, adding scheduled services in 1998. In May 2000 the Collings family sold the airline to Transjet, owner of Transtate Airlines. The two brands were merged and operated under the MacAir name. In November 2003 MacAir acquired Horizon Airlines. MacAir Airlines grew to become a major player in Australia's regional aviation network and played an important role in providing transport to both passengers and freight throughout regional Queensland.

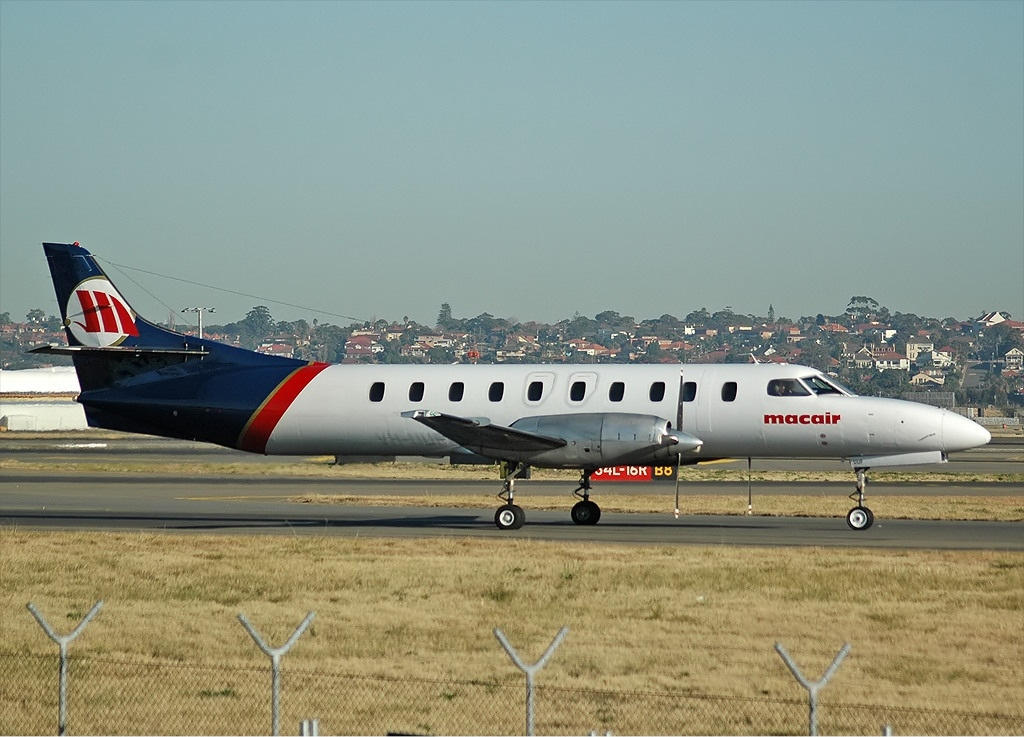
Macair Airlines Fairchild SA227-AC Metro III at Sydney Airport

MacAir Airlines was based in Townsville. Staff were based in Townsville, Cairns, Mount Isa and Brisbane.

In 1998, the growth of the mining industry and MacAir Airlines' fly-in fly-out operations led to the expansion of the carrier and the introduction of passenger services in North Queensland. The year 2000 saw further expansion for MacAir when it merged with passenger airline Transtate Airlines and incorporated their Gulf of Carpentaria services under the MacAir banner.

The link between Townsville and Mount Isa was one of the busiest. Passenger volumes on this route serving the mining industry saw the company introduce its ATR 42-500 into service.

MacAir Airlines was a Qantas commercial partner. As such, the airline had worldwide distribution through the Qantas reservation system. This agreement between the two carriers gave passengers the ability to choose several options for booking tickets along with the ability to accrue and utilise frequent flyer points on a number of services.

On 29 January 2009, MacAir placed itself into voluntary administration; the following day major creditor Suncorp-Metway appointed Ernst & Young as receivers and the airline ceased operations. MacAir had previously asked the Government of Queensland for a $7 million one-off ex gratia payment, but the government refused, saying that MacAir had "systemic issues." On 6 February, the business was closed by the receiver and its 200 employees dismissed. The administrator wound up the business and sold off the company's assets; however the airline only owned a single aircraft as the others were all leased, as were the ground installations.

== Destinations ==
At the end of January 2009 MacAir operated to the following scheduled destinations:

- From Townsville to:
  - Mount Isa
  - Cloncurry
  - Winton
  - Longreach
  - Moranbah
  - Mackay
  - Emerald
  - Brisbane
  - Hughenden
  - Richmond
  - Julia Creek
- From Cairns to:
  - Mount Isa
  - Normanton
  - Mornington
  - Burketown
  - Doomadgee
  - Pormpuraaw
  - Kowanyama
- From Brisbane to:
  - Moranbah
  - Townsville
  - Oakley
  - St George
  - Cunnamulla
  - Thargomindah
  - Charleville
  - Quilpie
  - Birdsville
  - Bedourie
  - Boulia
  - Mount Isa

Charter connections for mining companies from Townsville to:

- Osborne Mine Airport
- Cannington Mine (BHP)
- Century Airport (MMG)

== Fleet ==
Over time the Macair Airlines fleet consisted of the following aircraft:

- 1 ATR 42-500
- 8 Fairchild SA227-DC Metro 23
- 7 Saab 340B (six second generation 340B and one third generation 340B+)
- 2 de Havilland Canada DHC-6 Twin Otter
- Cessna 208 Caravan
- 1 British Aerospace Jetstream 41

== See also ==
- List of defunct airlines of Australia
