= Karumba Airport =

Airport in Queensland, Australia

- IATA: KRB; ICAO: YKMB

Summary
- Airport type: Public
- Operator: Shire of Carpentaria
- Location: Karumba, Queensland
- Elevation AMSL: 18 ft / 5 m
- Coordinates: 17°27′18″S 140°49′54″E

Map
- Location in Queensland

Runways
Direction	Length		Surface
Direction	m	ft	Surface
03/21	1,378	4,521	Asphalt
- Sources: Australian AIP

Karumba Airport (IATA: KRB, ICAO: YKMB) is an airport located 2 nautical miles (3.7 km; 2.3 mi) north of Karumba, Queensland, Australia. The airport received $91,500 for security upgrades in 2006.

== Airlines and destinations ==
Airlines	Destinations
Rex Airlines	Cairns, Doomadgee, Gununa, Mount Isa, Normanton
