= State Super =

Superannuation fund in Australia

State Super is one of the oldest superannuation funds in Australia beginning in New South Wales in 1919 with the creation of the State Superannuation Scheme for salaried public servants. State Super has close to $38 billion AUD in assets as at 30 June 2025 and 80,000 members. State Super members are current and previous NSW government employees and public sector workers such as police, teachers and nurses.

== State Super schemes ==
State Super is the Trustee of the following defined benefit schemes: State Authorities Superannuation Scheme (SASS), State Superannuation Scheme (SSS), and Police Superannuation Scheme (PSS). State Super also manages the State Authorities Non-contributory Superannuation Scheme (SANCS), which provides additional benefits to members of SASS, SSS and PSS. The State Super Pooled Fund comprises the assets of all four schemes.

== Diversified portfolio of Australian and International investments ==
Aviation transport assets in which State Super holds a stake include Birmingham Airport, Bristol Airport, Melbourne Airport, Launceston Airport. A stake in Queensland Airports which owns and operates Gold Coast Airport, Townsville Airport, Mount Isa Airport and Longreach Airport was held until 2024.
