= Bayley Island =

Island in Queensland, Australia

- Interactive map of Bayley Island

Geography
- Location: Queensland
- Coordinates: 16.89455769°S 139.06294877°E
- Adjacent to: Gulf of Carpentaria

Administration
- Australia
- State: Queensland

Demographics
- Population: 0 (2016)

Additional information
- Time zone: Australian Eastern Standard Time (UTC+10:00)

Bayley Island is one of the West Wellesley Islands, on the eastern side of the Gulf of Carpentaria, Queensland, Australia. It is within the Shire of Mornington.

== Geography ==
The island is located 2.72 kilometres (1.69 mi) northwest of the mainland, and less than 1 kilometre (0.62 mi) south of Pains Island.

Bayley Point lies opposite the island on the mainland.
