= Pains Island =

Island in Queensland, Australia

- Interactive map of Pains Island

Geography
- Location: Queensland
- Coordinates: 16.87038108°S 139.06199985°E
- Adjacent to: Gulf of Carpentaria
- Length: 1.62 km (1.007 mi)
- Width: 1.05 m (3.44 ft)

Administration
- Australia
- State: Queensland

Demographics
- Population: 0 (2016)

Additional information
- Time zone: Australian Eastern Standard Time (UTC+10:00)

Pains Island is one of the West Wellesley Islands, in Queensland's Gulf of Carpentaria, Australia. it is within the Shire of Mornington. It is located 4.83 km northwest of the mainland, and less than a kilometre north of Bayley Island.
