= Wellesley Islands =

- Suburb
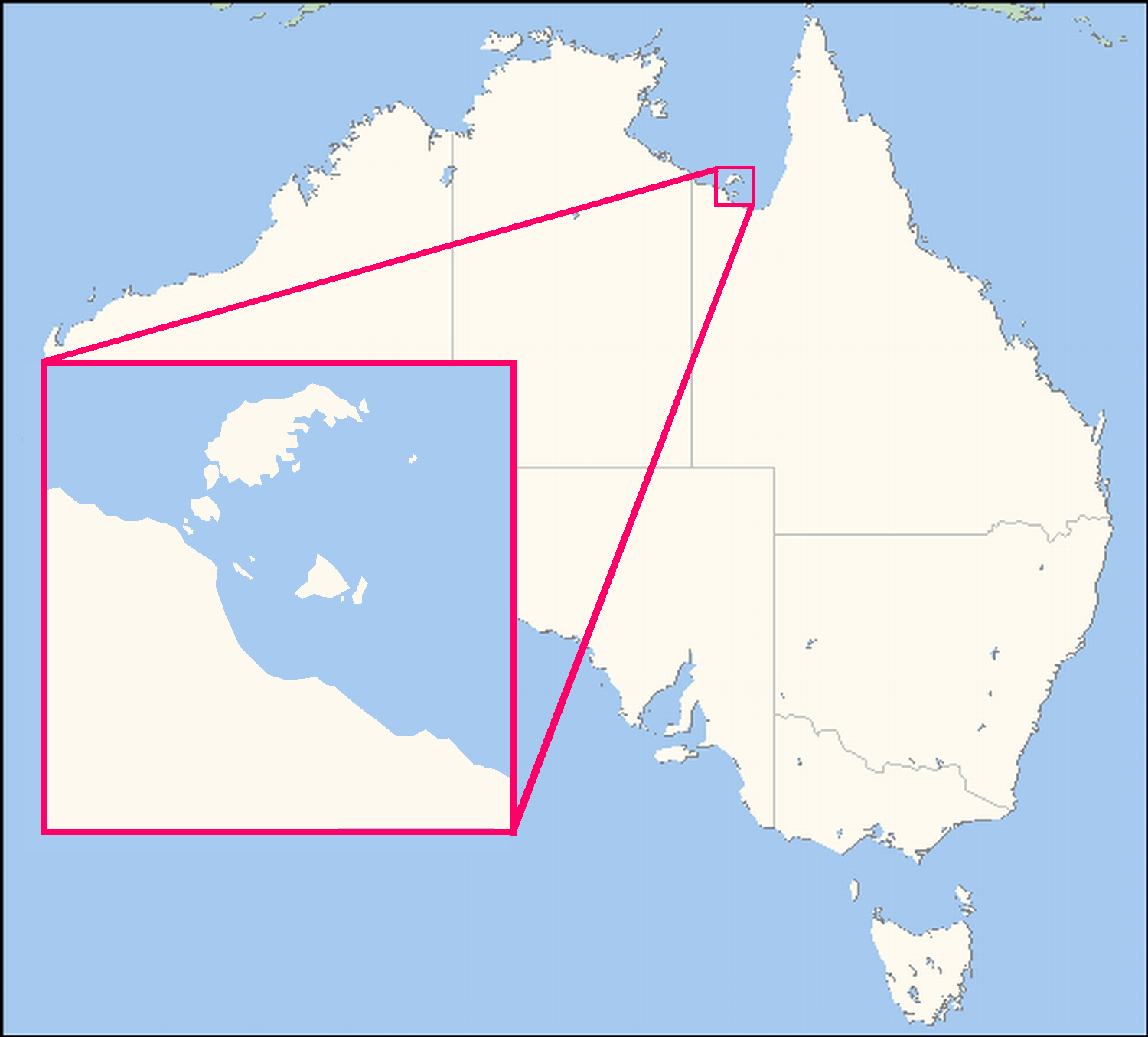
- Location map

- Interactive map of Wellesley Islands
- Coordinates: 16.5329°S 139.3881°E
- Country: Australia
- State: Queensland
- LGA: Shire of Mornington

Government
  - State electorate: Traeger
  - Federal division: Kennedy

Area
  - Total: 1,007.2 km^{2} (388.9 sq mi)

Population
  - Total: 1,022 (2021 census)
  - Density: 1.0147/km^{2} (2.6280/sq mi)
- Time zone: UTC+10:00 (AEST)
- Postcode: 4892
Suburbs around Wellesley Islands
Gulf of Carpentaria	Gulf of Carpentaria	Gulf of Carpentaria
Gulf of Carpentaria	Wellesley Islands	Gulf of Carpentaria
West Wellesley Islands	South Wellesley Islands	Gulf of Carpentaria

The Wellesley Islands, also known as the North Wellesley Islands, is a group of islands off the coast of Far North Queensland, Australia, in the Gulf of Carpentaria. It is a locality within the Shire of Mornington local government area. The traditional owners of the islands are the Lardil people. In the 2021 census, Wellesley Islands had a population of 1,022 people.

== Geography ==
The Wellesley Islands, also known as the North Wellesley Islands, is located in the Gulf of Carpentaria, on the eastern (Queensland) side of the gulf. The largest island in the group is Mornington Island, with most people living in the town of Gununa. Two small islands in the group, north of Mornington Island, are designated as the Manowar and Rocky Islands Important Bird Area, because of their importance for breeding seabirds, in particular the brown booby and lesser frigatebird. Other islands in the group include (from north to south):

- Moondalbee Island
- Lingnoonganee Island
- Pisonia Island
- Lingeleah Island
- Beahgoo Island
- Jinke Island
- Sydney Island
- Tulburrerr Island
- Denham Island
- Andrew Island

Immediately to the south is a group known as the West Wellesley Islands or Forsyth Islands, and to the south-east of them are the South Wellesley Islands, while the Bountiful Islands lie to the east of Mornington Island. Politically, all 26 islands in these groups are within the local government area of the Shire of Mornington.

Ecologically, they constitute subregion GUP10 of the IBRA-defined Gulf Plains bioregion of Australia.

== History ==
According to Indigenous lore, possibly mixed with fact, the islands were once part of mainland Australia:

In the beginning, as far back as we remember, our home islands were not islands at all as they are today. They were part of a peninsula that jutted out from the mainland and we roamed freely throughout the land without having to get in a boat like we do today. Then Garnguur, the seagull woman, took her raft and dragged it back and forth across the neck of the peninsula letting the sea pour in and making our homes into islands.

The Lardil people, who prefer to be known as Kunhanaamendaa (meaning people of Kunhanhaa, their name for Mornington Island), are an Aboriginal Australian people and the traditional owners of Mornington Island. The Lardil language (also known as Gununa, Ladil), is spoken on Mornington Island and on the northern Wellesley Islands.

The islands were charted by Matthew Flinders on 6 December 1802, and named by him some years later. He probably did not name them until sometime between 1803 and 1810, when he was in French captivity on Mauritius Island; he devoted that time to working on his charts and journals. Flinders probably named the island group in honour of Richard Wellesley, 1st Marquess Wellesley, Governor of Madras and Governor-General of Bengal from 1797 to 1805. Wellesley, along with Lord William Bentinck, Governor of Madras, tried to secure Flinders' release. He definitely named the largest island in the group, Mornington Island, after Wellesley, who was also the second Earl of Mornington.

The main town on Mornington Island, Gununa (a Lardil word) was founded in 1914 as Mornington Island Community, and renamed by the Queensland Place Names Board on 16 January 1982.

Mornington Island State School opened on 28 January 1975.

== Demographics ==
In the 2016 census, Wellesley Islands had a population of 1,136 people, all living on the largest island, Mornington Island.

In the 2021 census, Wellesley Islands had a population of 1,022 people.

== Education ==
Mornington Island State School is a government-run primary and secondary school at Lardil Street for boys and girls from early childhood through year 10. (16.6663°S 139.1825°E). In 2018, the school had an enrolment of 263 students, with 25 teachers and 14 full- and part-time non-teaching staff (the equivalent of 11 full-time m positions). It includes a special education program.

There are no schools on the island or any nearby areas that offer education to year 12. The only options for those years are enrolling in online distance education courses or going away to boarding school.

== See also ==
- Groote Eylandt
