= West Wellesley Islands =

- Suburb
- Interactive map of West Wellesley Islands
- Coordinates: 16.8368°S 139.1461°E
- Country: Australia
- State: Queensland
- LGA: Shire of Mornington

Government
  - State electorate: Traeger
  - Federal division: Kennedy

Area
  - Total: 45.4 km^{2} (17.5 sq mi)

Population
  - Total: 0 (2021 census)
  - Density: 0.000/km^{2} (0.000/sq mi)
- Time zone: UTC+10:00 (AEST)

The West Wellesley Islands, also referred to as the Forsyth Islands, is an island group and locality in the Gulf of Carpentaria within the Shire of Mornington, Queensland, Australia. In the 2021 census, West Wellesley Islands had "no people or a very low population".

== Geography ==
The island group lies to the south-west of the Wellesley Islands, closer to mainland Australia. The island group comprises a number of islands (from north to south):

- Denham Island
- Forsyth Island
- Ivis Island
- Pains Island
- Bayley Island

== Demographics ==
In the 2016 census, West Wellesley Islands had "no people or a very low population".

In the 2021 census, West Wellesley Islands had "no people or a very low population".

== Education ==
Students on Denham Island can attend Mornington Island State School (Early Childhood to Year 10) in Gununa on Mornington Island, but other islands are too distant. Also, there are no nearby schools offering education to Year 12. The alternatives are distance education and boarding school.
