= Manowar (disambiguation) =

Manowar is an American heavy metal band.

Manowar may also refer to:

- USCGC Manowar, a United States Coast Guard patrol boat
- X-O Manowar, a comic book superhero
- Manowar Island, Queensland, Australia, part of the Manowar and Rocky Islands Important Bird Area

== See also ==
- Man o' war (disambiguation)
