= Queensland Airports =

- Industry: Aviation
- Founded: 2003
- Headquarters: Bilinga, Queensland, Australia
- Area served: Queensland
- Key people: Ann Sherry (Chair); Amelia Evans (CEO)
- Revenue: $94 million (2022)
- Net income: $22 million (2022)
- Number of employees: 67 (June 2022)
- Subsidiaries: Gold Coast Airport; Longreach Airport; Mount Isa Airport; Townsville Airport
- Website: www.qldairports.com.au

Queensland Airports Limited is an Australian Airport consortium in charge of two separate Airport consortia in the state of Queensland, Australia. Under the two consortia, it is in charge of four airports; Gold Coast, Longreach, Mount Isa and Townsville.

== History ==
Queensland Airports (QA) was established in 2003 as part of corporate restructure of the shareholding of Gold Coast Airport, with it taking 100% ownership of the airport. In March 2005, QA acquired Mount Isa Airport and Townsville Airport. In 2012 it purchased Longreach Airport. It is a privately owned company with investment trusts and superannuation funds its shareholders.

In September 2024, a 74% shareholding was sold by The Infrastructure Fund, Australian Retirement Trust and State Super to a KKR and Skip Essential Instructure Fund consortium.
