= Mornington Island Airport =

- IATA: ONG; ICAO: YMTI

Summary
- Airport type: Public
- Operator: Mornington Shire Council
- Elevation AMSL: 33 ft / 10 m
- Coordinates: 16°39′41″S 139°10′10″E

Map
- Location in Queensland

Runways
Direction	Length		Surface
Direction	m	ft	Surface
09/27	1,515	4,970	Asphalt
12/30	756	2,480	Red gravel
- Sources: Australian AIP and aerodrome chart

Mornington Island Airport (IATA: ONG, ICAO: YMTI) is an airport on Mornington Island, Queensland, Australia. It is to the immediate north-west of the town of Gununa.

In 2006, the airport received A$253,402 for security upgrades.

== Airlines and destinations ==
Airlines	Destinations
Rex Airlines	Burketown, Cairns, Doomadgee, Mount Isa, Normanton

== See also ==
- List of airports in Queensland
