= Normanton Airport =

Airport in Queensland, Australia

- IATA: NTN; ICAO: YNTN

Summary
- Operator: Shire of Carpentaria
- Location: Normanton, Queensland
- Elevation AMSL: 73 ft / 22 m
- Coordinates: 17°41′06″S 141°04′12″E

Map
- Location in Queensland

Runways
Direction	Length		Surface
Direction	m	ft	Surface
14/32	1,676	5,499	Asphalt
- Sources: Australian AIP and aerodrome chart

Normanton Airport (IATA: NTN, ICAO: YNTN) is an airport in Normanton, Queensland, Australia. A new terminal was opened in February 2006.

In 2006, the airport received A$132,115 for security upgrades.

== Airlines and destinations ==
Airlines	Destinations
Rex Airlines	Burketown, Cairns, Doomadgee, Gununa, Mount Isa
West Wing Aviation	Century Mine, Doomadgee, Karumba, Mount Isa

== See also ==
- List of airports in Queensland
