= Ann Sherry =

Australian public servant and businesswoman

Ann Sherry AO
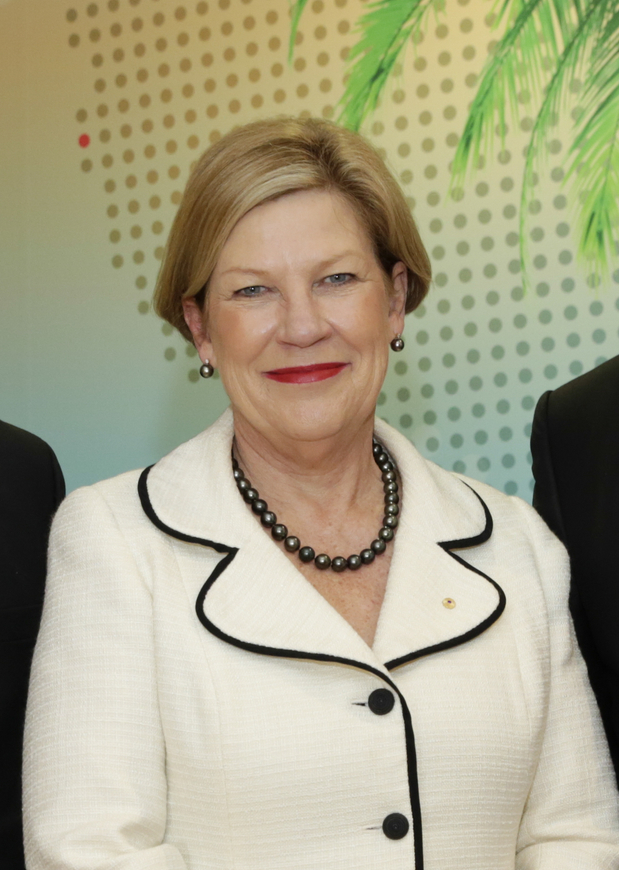
- Sherry in 2013
- Born: 2 February 1954 (age 72); Gympie, Queensland, Australia
- Occupations: Public servant, businesswoman, company director
- Known for: Centenary Medal, Officer of the Order of Australia, honorary doctorate
- Children: Nicholas
- Parent(s): John Morgan Sherry and June Caroline Sherry (née Stanton)
- Family: Alison Jane Sherry, Judith Margaret Wilson (sisters)

Ann Sherry AO (born 1954) is an Australian public servant and businesswoman.

== Early life ==
Ann Caroline Sherry was born on 2 February 1954 in Gympie, Queensland, Australia to parents, John Morgan Sherry and June Caroline (née Stanton), who were both pharmacists. She had an uneventful childhood in Gympie until her parents moved to a new pharmacy in Brisbane where she attended high school at Somerville House. Having finished school, she initially trained as a radiographer, but from 1975 to 1977 studied economics and politics at the University of Queensland achieving a Bachelor of Arts. She married Michael and had a son during her university studies. In the early 1980s, the couple moved to London, United Kingdom where Sherry was employed as a prison social worker.

== Political and public service ==
Sherry and family returned to Australia to live in Melbourne, Victoria. There Sherry worked in a trade union for 5 years becoming increasing involved in political debate. After this, she worked in the Victorian public service involved with delivery of programs for after-school care and for employment of people with disabilities.

She moved to Canberra where she was First Assistant Secretary (the head) of the Office of the Status of Women from 1992 to 1994. In that role, she advised the Prime Minister on how to improve the status of women in Australia. She represented the Australian Government in the areas of women's rights and human rights in the United Nations.

== Corporate life ==
=== Banking ===
Bob Joss, chief executive officer of Westpac was concerned about the lack of women in senior management roles in the corporation. Through a headhunter, Sherry was approached to join the bank. Her first role with the bank was a diverse one, covering superannuation, occupational health and safety, diversity and industrial relations. One of her first actions was to implement a paid maternity scheme for staff, an issue she had been passionate about in her role of the Office of the Status of Women. She rose through the corporate hierarchy of the bank to become the chief executive officer of the Bank of Melbourne (a subsidiary of Westpac) from 2000 to 2002. From 2002 to 2007, she was based in Auckland, New Zealand as the CEO for Westpac New Zealand (which also served the Pacific Islands). She spent 12 years working in banking.

=== Cruise ships ===
In July 2007, Sherry left banking and became CEO of Carnival Australia, a cruise line operating brands such as P&O, saying that she had always enjoyed and been passionate about travel. One of the difficult issues in her new role was the ongoing investigation into the death of Dianne Brimble in 2002 on the P&O Pacific Sky, which had caused considerable damage to the reputation of the cruise line, leading to suggestions that the cruise line should change its name. However, Sherry was influenced by the 75-year history of the cruise line in Australia and decide to retain the brand, working with advertising agency BMF to reposition the brand. Sherry set the bold target for the business of 1 millions Australians cruising by 2020. This milestone was achieved in 2015 as the industry was reshaped and became a popular form of holiday again.

=== Academia ===
In August 2022 Sherry took over the role of Chancellor at Queensland University of Technology.

=== Directorships ===
Ann Sherry also serves as a director on a number of boards:

- Palladium International
- National Australia Bank, 2017–
- Australian Rugby Union, 2012–2019
- Sydney Airport Holdings, 2014–2022
- Cape York Partnerships 2015
- Museum of Contemporary Art Australia 2016
- Committee for Sydney 2016–2018

She is the chair of:

- Australia New Zealand Leadership Forum (ANZLF)
- Male Champions of Change, STEM
- UNICEF Australia, 2018
- Philanthropy Australia, 2017–2019
- Queensland Airports 2022-

She is a Fellow of the Institute of Public Administration Australia.

She is a Fellow of the Australian Institute of Company Directors

She is an Ambassador of the Australian Indigenous Education Foundation.

== Honours ==
Ann Sherry has been the recipient of a number of honours:

- 2001, Centenary Medal for providing disadvantaged communities with banking services
- 2004, Order of Australia for corporate management policies and practices that address issues of gender, family life, and social justice
- 2010, listed as one of the Top 50 Businesswomen globally by Pink business magazine
- 2011, listed as one of the 100 Women in Leadership by FTSE Group
- 2012, listed on the True Leaders List by the Australian Financial Review
- 2013, Honorary Doctorate of Letters awarded by Macquarie University for her contribution to business and society
- 2014 Honorary Doctor of Business awarded by University of Queensland
- 2015 Overall Winner of the AFR 100 Women of Influence Award
- 2019 Winner of the Shared Value Champion 2019 Award
