= Manowar and Rocky Islands Important Bird Area =

Conservation area in Queensland, Australia

Coordinates: 16°16′05″S 139°16′22″E

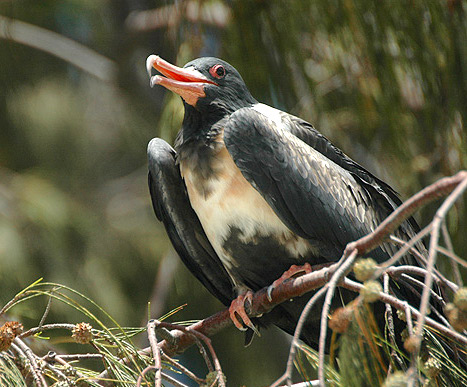
The islands are an important breeding site for Lesser Frigatebirds.

The Manowar and Rocky Islands Important Bird Area comprises two small islands in the Wellesley Islands group. It lies in the southeastern region of the Gulf of Carpentaria and is part of the state of Queensland, Australia. The two islands are important habitats for breeding seabirds.

== Description ==
The islands have a collective area of 51 hectares and lie about 40 km northwest of Mornington Island, which is the largest island in the Wellesley Group. The climate is monsoonal, with a hot wet season from December to April and an extended dry season from May to November. The islands are Aboriginal lands, owned by the Lardil people. The traditional name of Manowar Island is Delmerriya or Wudma; that of Rocky Island is Kalamburriya.

== Birds ==
The islands have been identified by BirdLife International as an Important Bird Area (IBA) because they support over 1% of the world populations of brown boobies (up to 12,000 breeding pairs) and lesser frigatebirds (up to 7700 breeding pairs). Large numbers of Australian pelicans, as well as smaller numbers of eastern reef egrets, ospreys and white-bellied sea-eagles also breed on the islands.
