= Bountiful Islands =

Group of islands in Queensland, Australia

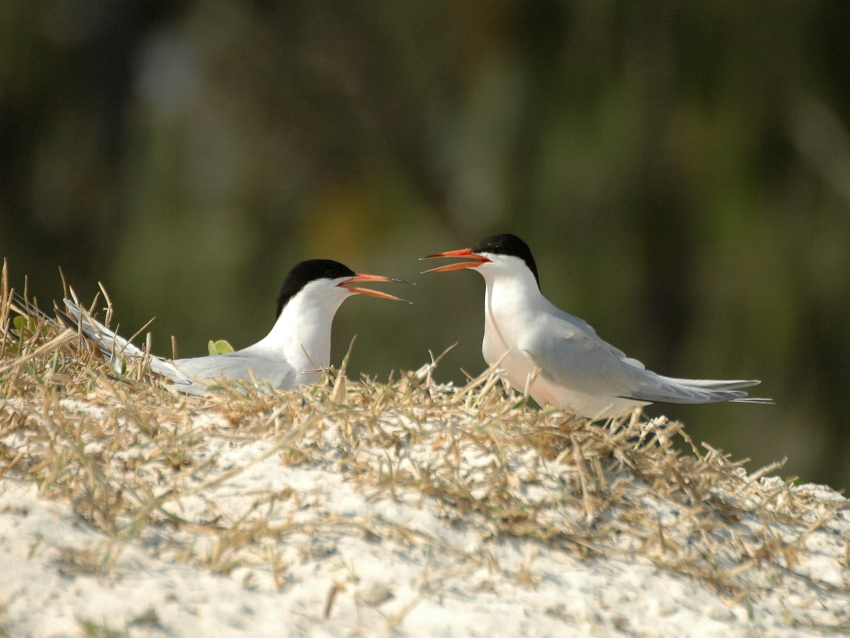
- The Bountiful Islands are an important breeding site for roseate terns
- Interactive map of Bountiful Islands

Geography
- Location: Northern Australia
- Coordinates: 16.665°S 139.86°E
- Area: 4.5 km^{2} (1.7 sq mi)

Administration
- Australia
- State: Queensland

The Bountiful Islands are a group of small islands in the Gulf of Carpentaria, northern Australia, belonging to the state of Queensland and within the Shire of Mornington.

The islands cover an area of 442 ha (1,090 acres). They form an Important Bird Area because they support more than 1% of the global population of two bird species, with up to 2,000 pairs of roseate terns and 26–30,000 pairs of crested terns. It is around 450 hectares or 4.5 square km in size.

== See also ==
- List of islands of Australia
