= Burketown Airport =

- IATA: BUC; ICAO: YBKT

Summary
- Airport type: Public
- Operator: Burke Shire Council
- Location: Burketown, Queensland, Australia
- Elevation AMSL: 21 ft (6.4 m)
- Coordinates: 17°44′57″S 139°32′11″E
- Website: www.burke.qld.gov.au

Map
- Location in Queensland

Runways
Direction	Length		Surface
Direction	m	ft	Surface
03/21	1,372	4,501	Asphalt
14/32	757	2,484	Black silt clay
- Sources: Australian AIP and aerodrome chart

Burketown Airport (IATA: BUC, ICAO: YBKT) is an airport located 1 nautical mile (1.9 km; 1.2 mi) southwest of Burketown, Queensland, Australia.

== History ==
In 2023, the runway received significant flood damage. In September 2026 it reopened after a $24 million reconstruction funded by the Federal and Quueensland governments designed to make it more flood resilient with the runway raised by 40 centimetres. Royal Flying Doctor Service and Savannah Aviation charter flights began using the new runway in September, with Rex Airlines commencing in November 2026.

== Airlines and destinations ==
Airlines	Destinations
Rex Airlines	Cairns, Doomadgee, Gununa, Mount Isa, Normanton
