= Hughenden Airport =

Airport in Hughenden, Queensland, Australia

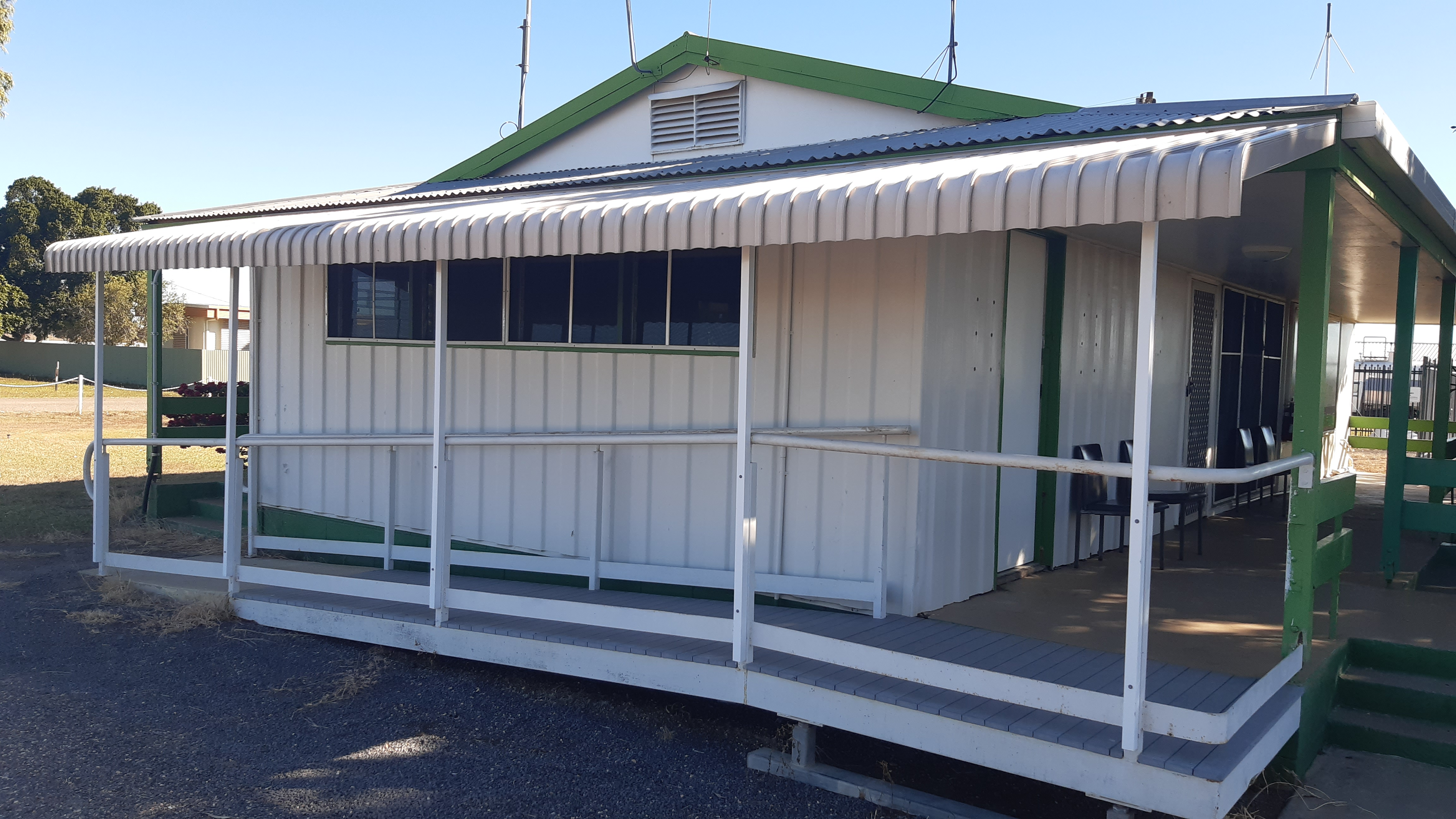
- The airport building in 2025
- IATA: HGD; ICAO: YHUG

Summary
- Airport type: Public
- Operator: Flinders Shire Council
- Serves: Hughenden, Queensland
- Location: Hughenden, Queensland, Australia
- Elevation AMSL: 1,043 ft / 318 m
- Coordinates: 20°48′45″S 144°13′28″E
- Website: Official website

Map
- Location in Queensland

Runways
Direction	Length		Surface
Direction	m	ft	Surface
12/30	1,644	5,394	Asphalt
09/24	930	3,051	Brown gravel
- Sources: Australian AIP and aerodrome chart

Hughenden Airport (IATA: HGD, ICAO: YHUG) is an airport in Hughenden, Queensland, Australia. The airport was opened in 1963. The airport is 2 nautical miles (3.7 km; 2.3 mi) northeast of the town.

== Airlines and destinations ==
Airlines	Destinations
Rex Airlines	Julia Creek, Mount Isa, Richmond, Townsville

== See also ==
- List of airports in Queensland
