= Richmond Airport (Queensland) =

- IATA: RCM; ICAO: YRMD

Summary
- Airport type: Public
- Operator: Richmond Shire Council
- Serves: Richmond, Queensland, Australia
- Elevation AMSL: 676 ft / 206 m
- Coordinates: 20°42′07″S 143°06′53″E

Map
- Location in Queensland

Runways
Direction	Length		Surface
Direction	m	ft	Surface
09/27	1,524	5,000	Asphalt
- Sources: Australian AIP and aerodrome chart

Richmond Airport (IATA: RCM, ICAO: YRMD) is 2 miles northwest of Richmond, Queensland, Australia. It is operated by the Richmond Shire Council.

== Facilities ==
The airport is 676 ft (206 m) above sea level and has one asphalt runway, 09/27, 1,524 m × 30 m (5,000 ft × 98 ft) long.

== Airlines and destinations ==
Airlines	Destinations
Rex Airlines	Hughenden, Julia Creek, Mount Isa, Townsville

== See also ==
- List of airports in Queensland
