= Julia Creek Airport =

Airport in Queensland, Australia

- IATA: JCK; ICAO: YJLC

Summary
- Airport type: Public
- Operator: McKinlay Shire Council
- Location: Julia Creek, Queensland, Australia
- Elevation AMSL: 404 ft (123 m)
- Coordinates: 20°40′06″S 141°43′07″E
- Website: www.mckinlay.qld.gov.au

Map
- Location in Queensland

Runways
| Direction | Length | | Surface |
| Direction | m | ft | Surface |
|---|---|---|---|
| 10/28 | 1,402 | 4,600 |
- Sources: Australian AIP and aerodrome chart

Julia Creek Airport (IATA: JCK, ICAO: YJLC) is an airport in Julia Creek, Queensland, Australia.

Julia Creek Airport opened a new terminal building on 7 March 2012. Passenger numbers for the scheduled Rex Airline services to Mount Isa and Townsville are steadily increasing.

== Airlines and destinations ==
| Airlines | Destinations |
|---|---|
| Rex Airlines | Hughenden, Mount Isa, Richmond, Townsville |

== See also ==
- List of airports in Queensland
