= Mackay Airport =

- Mackay Airport Departures

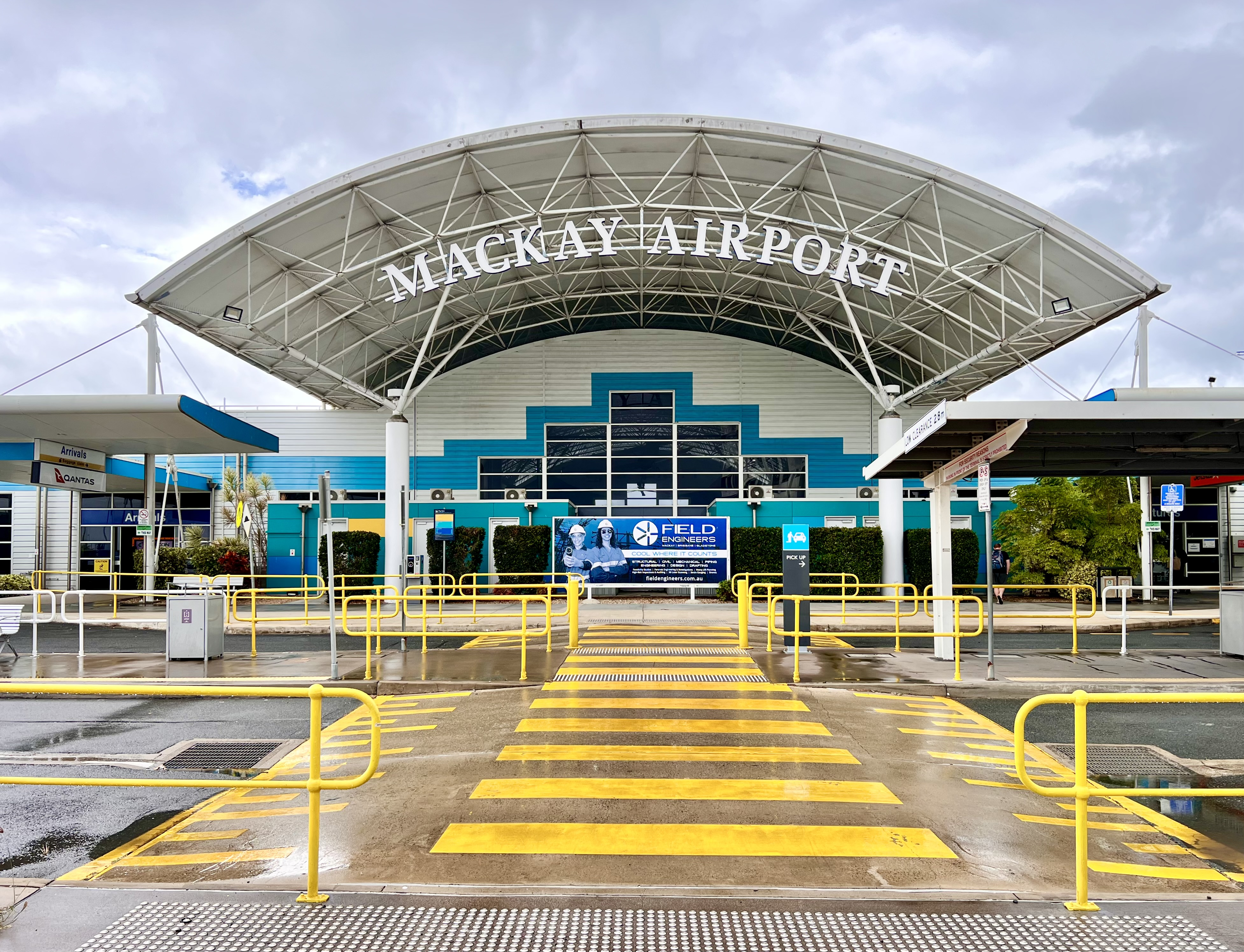
- IATA: MKY; ICAO: YBMK

Summary
- Airport type: Public
- Operator: Mackay Airport Pty Ltd
- Location: Mackay, Queensland
- Elevation AMSL: 19 ft (5.8 m)
- Coordinates: 21°10′15″S 149°10′57″E
- Website: www.mackayairport.com.au

Map
- Location in Queensland

Runways
Direction	Length		Surface
Direction	m	ft	Surface
14/32	1,981	6,499	Asphalt

Statistics (2024-25)
- Passengers: ▼902,500
- Aircraftmovements: ▼10,749
- Sources: Australian AIP and aerodrome chart and BITRE

Mackay Airport (IATA: MKY, ICAO: YBMK) located in South Mackay, Queensland, Australia is a major Australian regional airport that services the city of Mackay, with flights to the cities of Brisbane, Rockhampton, Townsville and Cairns. In the year ending 30 June 2025, the airport handled 902,355 passengers making it the 15th busiest airport in Australia.

The airport attracts a diverse range of carriers to service the travel needs of the business, commercial, industrial, leisure and visiting friends and relatives sectors.

Mackay is a thriving mining, agricultural, industrial and regional business centre that also supports a growing tourism industry and is a gateway to the Whitsunday coast and islands.

== History ==
Moves to establish an airport at Mackay began in 1927, when Captain Ron Adair selected the site of the town commons for the construction of an aerodrome, and landed the first plane in Mackay there, his own Avro biplane. The Mackay City Council agreed in February 1930 to apply to excise land from the commons for aviation purposes, and in April 1930 the Mackay Aerodrome was officially opened by the mayor Ian Wood. The controller of civil aviation in Australia issued an airport licence on 9 March 1931.

In 1938, the airport held an airshow featuring ten aircraft, which attracted over 8,000 spectators.

Mackay Airport had grass landing strips until 1940, when the Commonwealth Government extended the airport's boundaries and upgraded the runways to unsealed gravel for use during World War II. Until 1945, Mackay Airport served as an important operational military base due to its proximity to the South West Pacific Area. In 1948, the main runway was extended, and in 1958 it was further upgraded, sealed and strengthened.

In 1941, the Commonwealth Government took control of the airport from the Mackay City Council, and built a new passenger terminal in 1953. The old terminal is still in use today, with a flight school operating out of one of its tenancies, offering a variety of pilot training programs in addition to more advanced flying qualifications. In 1984, the government offered control of the airport back to the council, which refused. It then offered the airport to the Mackay Port Authority, then changed its mind and announced the airport would be run by the Federal Airports Corporation. This move prompted an angry local reaction in Mackay, which eventually led to the port authority gaining control of the airport.

=== Present ===
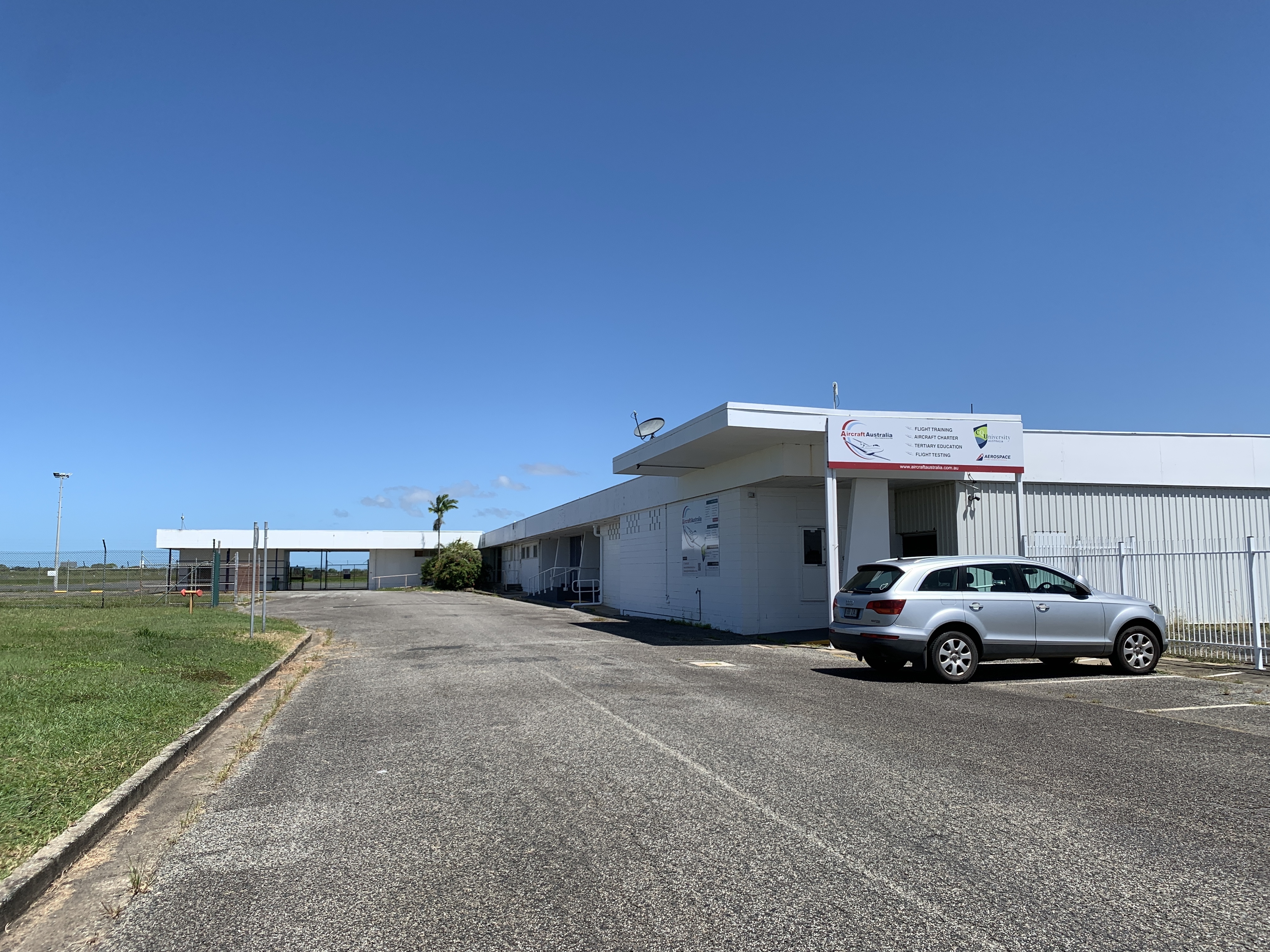
The Old Terminal Building at Mackay Airport in 2023

Mackay Airport is used by most major airlines operating in Australia: Qantas subsidiaries QantasLink and Jetstar and Virgin Australia.

Despite the collapse of airlines Ansett Australia and Flight West in 2001, Mackay Airport experienced considerable growth in subsequent years, due to the use of the airport by Virgin Australia and the expansion of QantasLink services.

In November 2008, Mackay Airport was sold to a private consortium to fund the development of Mackay Hospital.

In the year 2008, the airport handled 837,416 passengers making it the 15th busiest airport in Australia.

In January 2010, Auckland International Airport Limited, announced plans to purchase almost 25 per cent of North Queensland Airports (NQA), operator of the airports at Cairns and Mackay, for about $167 million. Synergies for Auckland Airport with North Queensland Airports include better management of the airports' operations and working more closely with each other to attract airlines that currently don't fly to either. NQA stands to be a good stand-alone investment for future economic growth for the state of Queensland, as international tourism for the area of Northern Queensland increases, thus, illustrating a significant increase in demand for future international flights to the airports.

In September 2015, Tigerair Australia announced it was suspending the Mackay-Melbourne service due to decline in passenger numbers.

Jetstar operated a Mackay-Gold Coast route from June 2014 until September, 2015. It was also suspended due to a small number of passengers.

In March, 2016 Regional Air began regular charter flights between Mackay and Hamilton Island, however Regional Air have now ceased operations.

In 2016, the cross runway 05/23 (1,344 m x 30 m) was closed and partially converted into a taxiway due to prohibitive lighting and pavement maintenance costs.

In July 2021, local flight training organisation, Horizon Airways, was acquired by local investors and expanded substantially. Horizon Airways has expanded to a fleet of 9 aircraft, and provides regular charter flights to various local locations, particularly Keswick and Hamilton Islands.

== Airlines and destinations ==
=== Passenger ===
Airlines	Destinations
Qantas	Brisbane
QantasLink	Brisbane, Cairns, Rockhampton, Townsville
Virgin Australia	Brisbane

=== Cargo ===
Airlines	Destinations
Pel-Air	Brisbane
Toll Aviation	Brisbane, Mount Isa

== Operations ==
Busiest domestic routes into and out of Mackay Airport (Year Ending June 2022)
Rank	Airport	Passengers carried	% change	Airline carriers
1	Queensland, Brisbane Airport	565,000	16.8	Jetstar, Qantas, QantasLink, Virgin Australia
2	Queensland, Cairns Airport	no data yet	no data yet	QantasLink
2	Queensland, Townsville Airport	no data yet	no data yet	QantasLink
2	Queensland, Rockhampton Airport	no data yet	no data yet	QantasLink

== See also ==
- List of airports in Queensland
