= Cairns Airport =

Airport in Cairns, Queensland, Australia

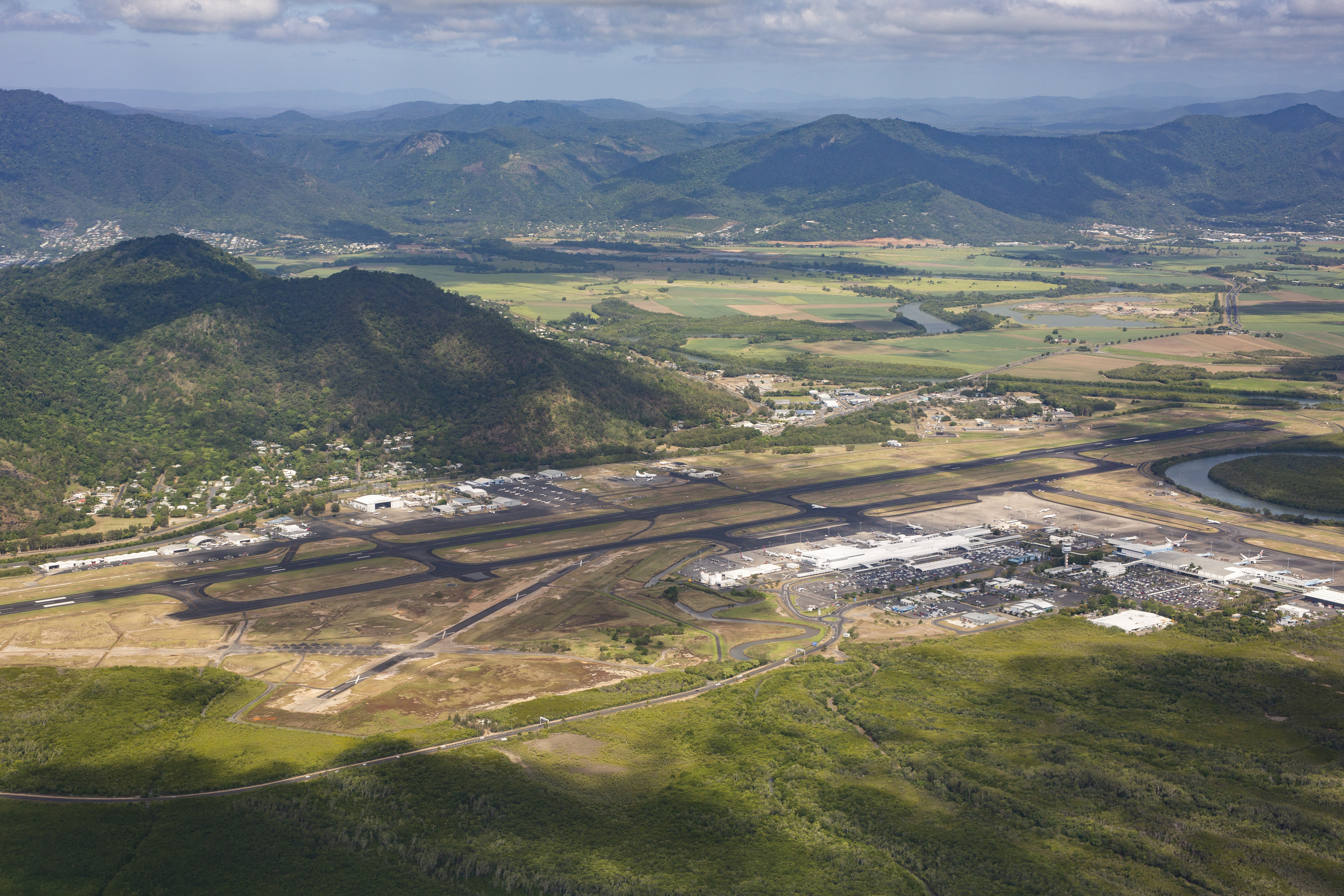
- IATA: CNS; ICAO: YBCS; WMO: 94287

Summary
- Airport type: Public
- Operator: North Queensland Airports Group
- Serves: Cairns
- Location: Aeroglen, Queensland, Australia
- Hub for: ASL Airlines Australia
- Operating base for: Jetstar; QantasLink; Skytrans Airlines
- Elevation AMSL: 10 ft (3.0 m)
- Coordinates: 16°53′09″S 145°45′19″E
- Website: cairnsairport.com.au

Map
- Interactive map of Cairns Airport

Runways
Direction	Length		Surface
Direction	m	ft	Surface
15/33	3,156	10,354	Asphalt

Statistics
- Passenger movements (2025): ▲4,875,487
- Aircraft movements (2016/2017): ▲56,526
- Source: AIP Enroute Supplement passenger and aircraft movements from the Bureau of Infrastructure & Transport Research Economics

Cairns Airport (IATA: CNS, ICAO: YBCS) is an international airport in Cairns, Queensland, Australia. It is the seventh busiest airport in Australia. The airport is located 7 kilometres (4.3 mi) north of the Cairns central business district in the suburb of Aeroglen. The airport lies between Mount Whitfield to the west and Trinity Bay to the east.

The airport has direct flights to 10 international and 27 domestic destinations and many general aviation flights including a number of helicopter operators. Flights are operated to all major Australian cities and tourist destinations, regional communities in Far North Queensland, and a number of international destinations in the Asia-Pacific region with connections to the rest of the world. The airport formed the main base for Australian Airlines prior to its ceasing of operations in June 2006. It is also a base for the Royal Flying Doctor Service and the search and rescue helicopters. Over 4.8 million passengers used the airport in 2023/24.

Owned by the Government of Queensland, it is leased to JPMorgan Asset Management under a 99-year lease.

== History ==
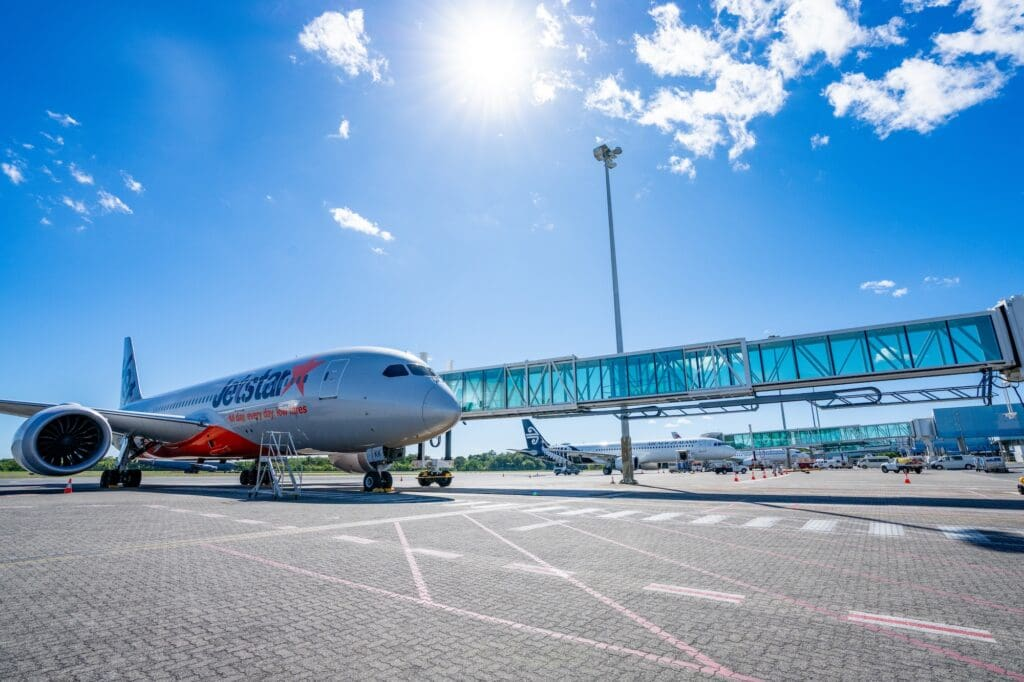
Apron view of the international terminal in 2024

During the late 1930s, the Federal Government purchased an existing aerodrome in Cairns from the local council, placing it under the control of the Department of Civil Aviation. During World War II, the airport was used by the Royal Australian Air Force (RAAF) from 1941 onwards. In 1942, the RAAF established the 25th Operational Base Unit at Cairns, who developed it as a refuelling point for military aircraft. Surfacing and extending the main runway to support these operations was completed during 1943. The airport was used by the United States Army Air Forces as a transport base, with the 33d Troop Carrier Squadron (374th Troop Carrier Group) operating from the base during 1942 and 1943. In 1949, the main runway was lengthened to 1,730 m (5,680 ft) to accommodate larger aircraft.

Between 1940 and 1951, over £1 million was spent on upgrades to the airport, which by that time handled 11 scheduled aircraft movements per day and maintained a fire service, a meteorological office, an air traffic control tower and its own power station. The DCA further planned to install an Instrument Landing System on the main runway. Ahead of the 1956 Melbourne Olympics, the Olympic flame was carried from Athens to Cairns aboard a Qantas airliner, where the torch relay began.

During the mid-1960s, the airport was upgraded and the runway further lengthened to 2,020 m (6,630 ft) and strengthened so jets could land.

During the 1970s, Australia's two domestic airlines Trans Australia Airlines and Ansett provided regular scheduled services to most Australian capital cities and also Papua New Guinea, while in 1975 Air Niugini became the first international airline to commence flights out of Cairns, to Port Moresby in Papua New Guinea. In 1982, redevelopment of the airport commenced. This involved further lengthening of the runway to 2,600 m (8,500 ft) (making it the longest runway in Queensland) and construction of a new terminal building. The first stage of the redevelopment was finished in 1984 and a dual International and Domestic Terminal was opened.

At the end of the 1980s the second stage of redevelopment was completed. This included a new separate International Terminal, associated aprons and taxiways, costing an estimated $80 million. The main runway was again extended, to 3,196 m (10,486 ft). The third stage of redevelopment was completed in 1997, during which a three-storey Airport Administration Centre was constructed providing 4,000 m^{2} (43,000 sq ft) of office space.

A $200 million redevelopment of the Domestic Terminal started in August 2007 and was completed in 2010. Check-in facilities were expanded into a common-user facility for all airlines, and the building enlarged. Five new jet bridges replaced the existing three old bridges.

In December 2008, the Government of Queensland sold a 99-year lease to North Queensland Airports, a consortium of JPMorgan Asset Management, Westpac, the Private Capital Group and Perron Group. In January 2010 Auckland International Airport Limited (AIA) purchased Westpac's 25% shareholding. In March 2018, AIA sold its stake to the other shareholders with JPMorgan having 66%, the Infrastructure Fund 27% and Perron Group 7%.

A further upgrade of the Domestic Terminal commenced in 2019 and was completed in August 2020, at a total cost of $55 million. The main purpose of the upgrade was to prepare the terminal to handle the domestic portion of the airport's projected 6 million passengers annually from 2027. The floor area of the departure hall was increased to 10,000 m^{2} (110,000 sq ft), and an additional 2,000 m^{2} (22,000 sq ft) of dining and retail facilities were added. The upgrade also included expanded seating areas, a new interactive children's play screen, an upgraded Parenting Room, and a new Quiet Room.

Virgin Australia launched daily direct service to Tokyo-Haneda on 28 June 2023 with Boeing 737 MAX 8s. However, due to low demand, the route ceased on 24 February 2025.

In early 2023, it was announced that the International Terminal (Terminal 1) would undergo its first major upgrade in April 2023 to a value of $55 million. The announced upgrades would be rolled out in stages to 'minimise passenger disruptions', the first of which would feature the installation of four new glass air-bridges and the re-cladding of the exterior of the building.

In December 2023, the airport was affected by Cyclone Jasper forcing it to close for several days. In March 2024, it was announced that both Cairns and Mackay Airports would run on 100% renewable energy sources from 2025.

In August 2025, JP Morgan increased it shareholding to 100%.

== Facilities ==
=== Terminals ===
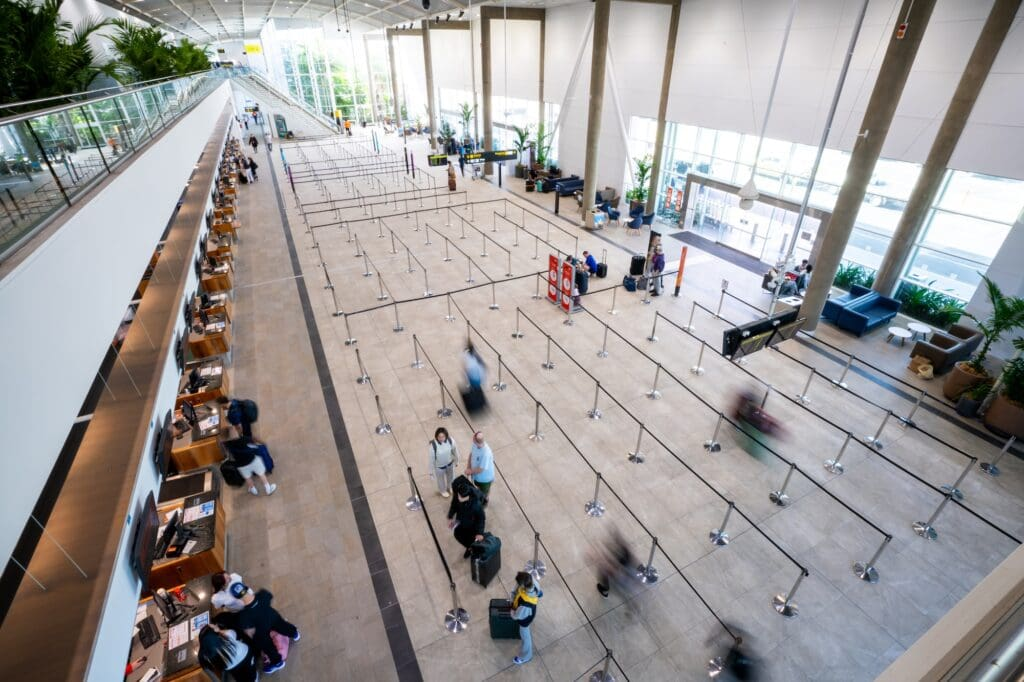
International Terminal check-in after 2024 upgrade

The airport has two passenger terminals on the eastern side of the airport on reclaimed mangrove swamp. They are approximately 6 km (3.7 mi) north of the Cairns Central Shopping Centre and situated on Airport Avenue off Sheridan Street (Captain Cook Highway). The terminals are in separate buildings 200 m (660 ft) from one another. The Domestic Terminal is number 2, and has five jet bridges and 17 gates. The International Terminal is number 1, and has six jet bridges and ten gates in total.

A large and dedicated air-freight terminal termed the: 'Cairns Regional Trade Distribution Centre' was announced by the Queensland State Government Ministers in 2022. This facility will feature a 2400 square meter freight logistics hub and aim to improve the $40.4 million in food and agricultural exports through the airport. This is situated partially atop the former general aviation runway 12/30.

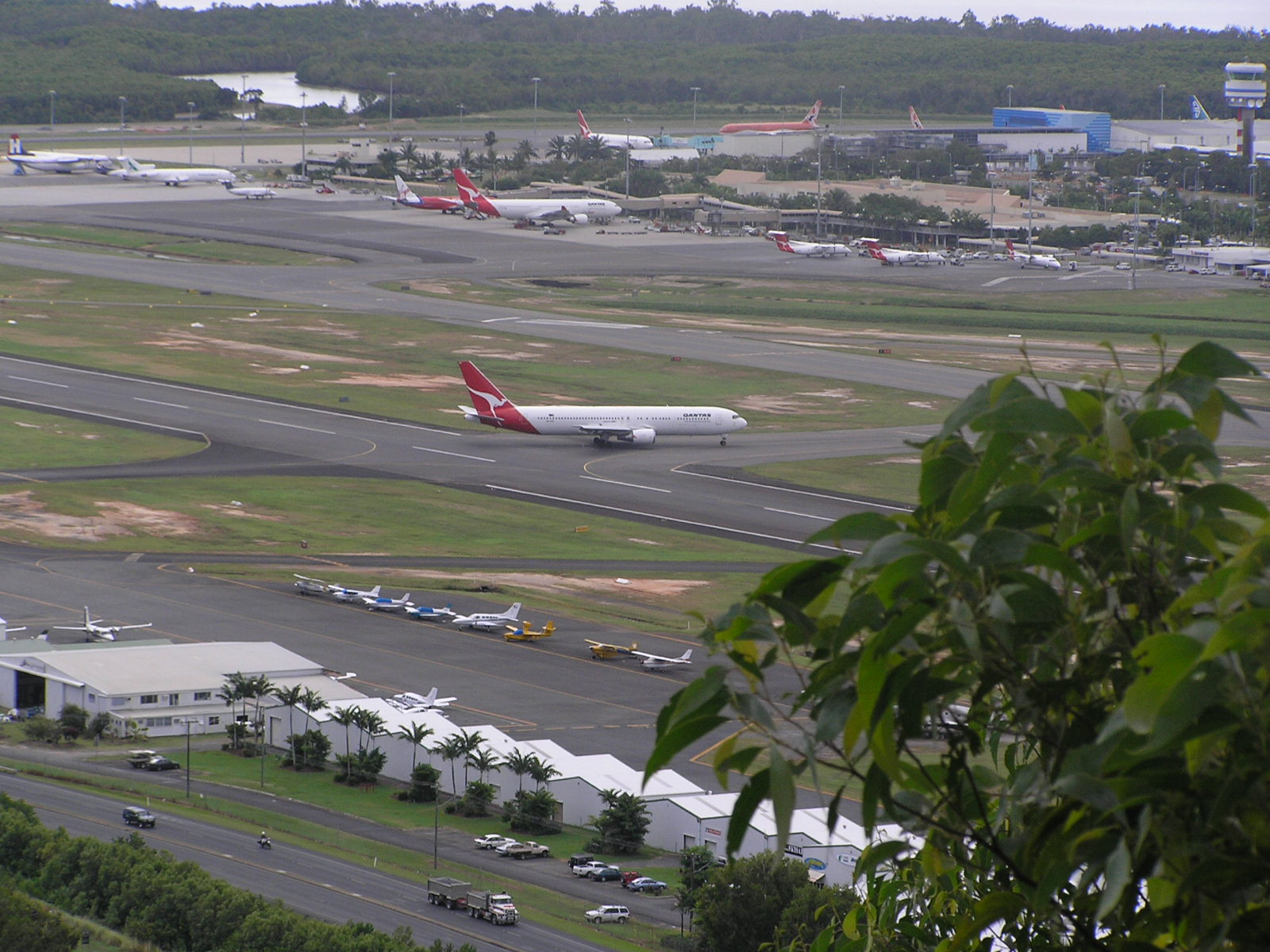
Paronamic view of Cairns Airport, including airplanes of Qantas, QantasLink, Virgin Blue and Air New Zealand

=== Runways ===
The airport has a single runway (15/33) which is 3,156 m (10,354 ft) long. The flight path to the north of the main runway is located directly overhead Cairns' northern beach suburbs. The flight path to the south is located directly over central Cairns. A smaller (925 m (3,035 ft)) runway 12/30 that was used for general aviation lies to the east; its final approach crossed the main runway. As of April 2011 this runway was closed and had been converted to a helipad area before the freight terminal's construction.

== Airlines and destinations ==
=== Passenger ===
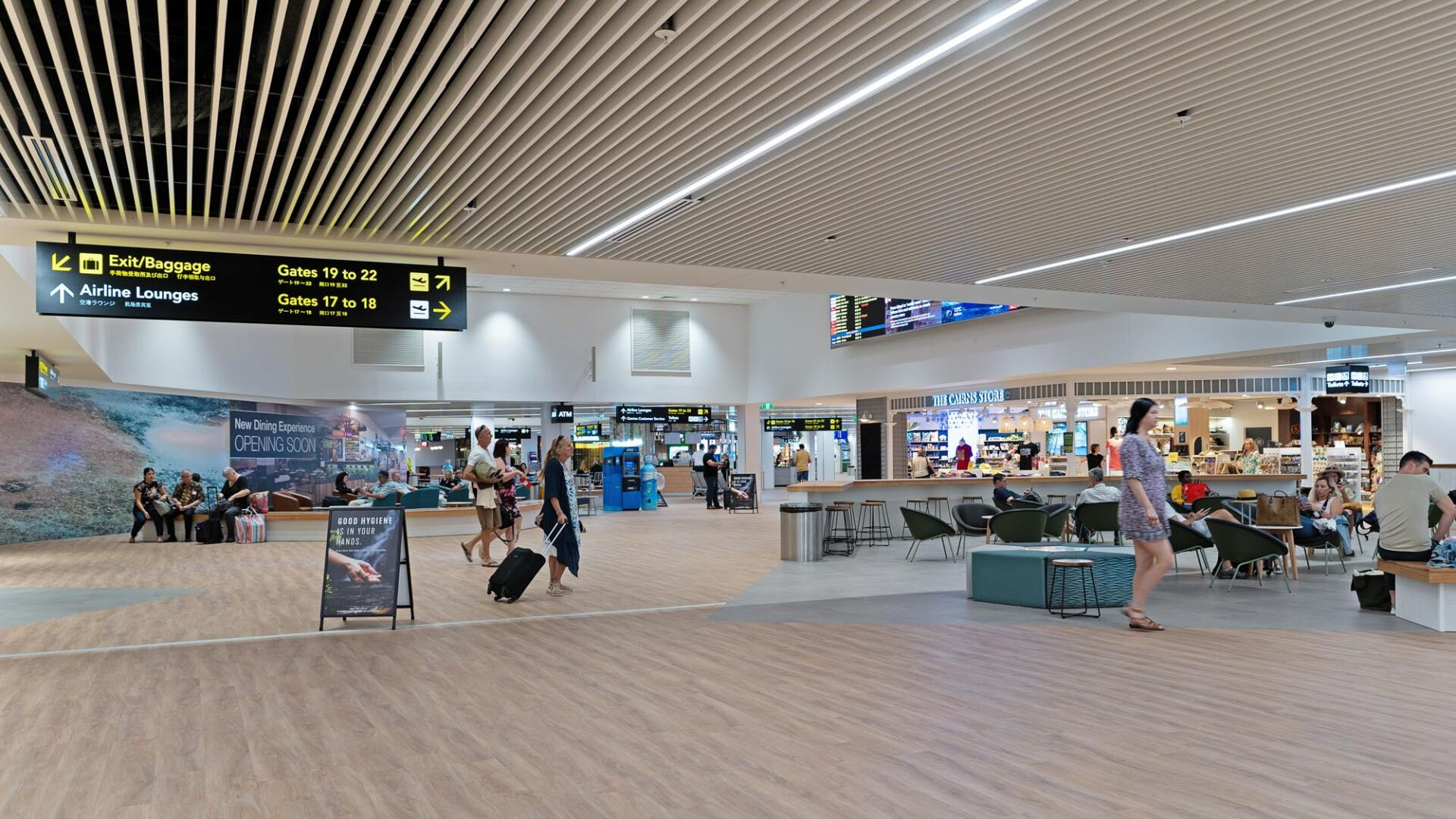
Domestic Terminal, 2022

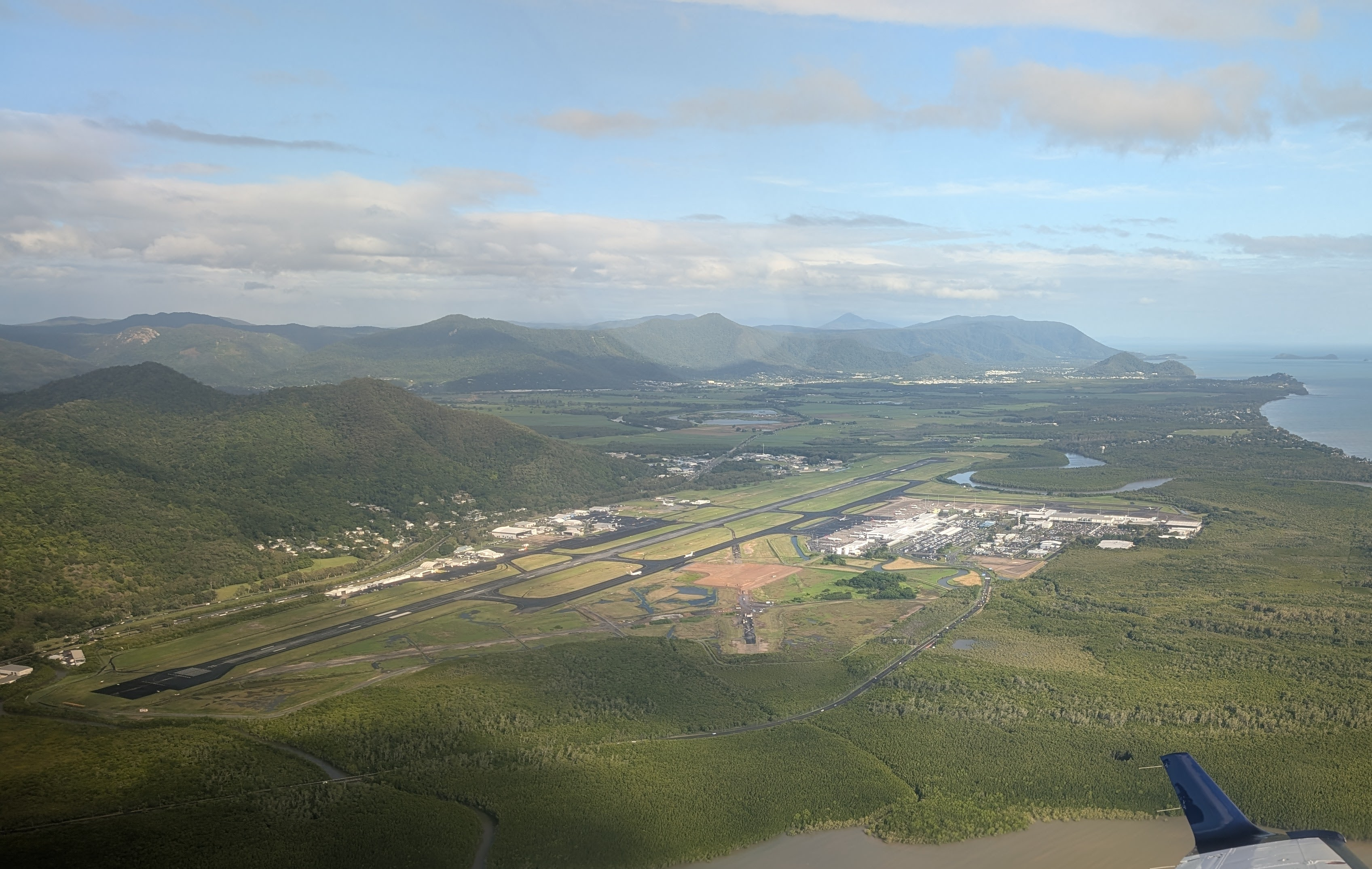
Cairns Airport on departure in 2025 with the new air-freight complex under construction

Airlines	Destinations
Air New Zealand	Seasonal: Auckland
Air Niugini	Port Moresby
Airnorth	Alice Springs, Darwin, Gove
Alliance Airlines	Townsville, Weipa; Charter: Century Mine, Cannington, Cloncurry, Groote Eylandt
Fiji Airways	Nadi
Hinterland Aviation	Coen, Cooktown, Kowanyama, Lockhart River, Pormpuraaw
Jetstar	Adelaide, Brisbane, Denpasar, Gold Coast, Melbourne, Osaka–Kansai, Perth, Sunshine Coast, Sydney–Kingsford Smith, Tokyo–Narita
Qantas	Brisbane, Melbourne, Sydney–Kingsford Smith
QantasLink	Ayers Rock, Brisbane, Darwin, Horn Island, Mackay, Townsville, Weipa
Rex Airlines	Burketown, Doomadgee, Mornington Island, Mount Isa, (Note: Gulf route - Cairns-Normanton-Mornington Island-Burketown-Doomadgee-Mount Isa) Normanton, Townsville
Singapore Airlines	Singapore
Skytrans Australia	Aurukun, Bamaga, Kowanyama, Lockhart River, Moranbah, Pormpuraaw, Proserpine
Virgin Australia	Brisbane, Melbourne, Sydney–Kingsford Smith

=== Cargo ===
Airlines	Destinations	Refs
Qantas Freight	Brisbane, Melbourne, Sydney–Kingsford Smith, Sydney–Western, Townsville	

== Other tenants ==
There are operators of emergency medical retrieval and rescue services based at the airport, including Emergency Management Queensland and the Royal Flying Doctor Service.

== Statistics ==
Annual passenger statistics for Cairns Airport
Year	Domestic	International	Total	Change
1998	1,915,717	688,058	2,603,775	▼ –2.2%
1999	2,022,908	660,659	2,683,567	▲3.1%
2000	2,132,713	680,133	2,812,846	▲4.8%
2001	2,025,193	665,118	2,690,311	▼ –4.4%
2002	2,087,643	766,256	2,853,899	▲6.1%
2003	2,246,566	746,561	2,993,127	▲4.9%
2004	2,582,591	846,846	3,429,437	▲14.6%
2005	2,842,947	862,184	3,705,131	▲8.0%
2006	2,967,077	791,709	3,758,786	▲1.4%
2007	3,066,414	702,048	3,768,462	▲0.3%
2008	3,153,171	595,461	3,748,632	▼ –0.5%
2009	3,133,393	404,803	3,538,196	▼ –5.6%
2010	3,254,097	495,873	3,749,970	▲6.0%
2011	3,361,097	504,072	3,865,169	▲3.1%
2012	3,569,195	511,359	4,080,554	▲5.6%
2013	3,754,331	492,091	4,246,422	▲4.1%
2014	3,857,399	460,910	4,318,309	▲1.7%
2015	3,975,309	545,733	4,521,042	▲4.7%
2016	4,208,221	642,293	4,850,514	▲7.3%
2017	4,278,311	662,173	4,940,484	▲1.9%
2018	4,283,247	662,551	4,945,798	▲0.1%
2019	4,126,357	651,824	4,778,181	▼ –3.4%
2020	1,587,304	119,221	1,706,525	▼ –64.3%
2021	2,312,189	2,490	2,314,679	▲35.6%
2022	3,672,627	135,262	3,807,889	▲64.5%
2023	3,842,622	322,541	4,292,670	▲11%
2024	4,091,700	625,941	4,717,641	▲11.1%
2025	4,038,102	665,872	4,875,498	▲3.35%

=== Domestic ===
Busiest Domestic Routes – Cairns Airport 2024
Rank	Airport	Number of passengers	% change
1	Brisbane	1,305,500	▲5%
2	Sydney	919,200	▲4.5%
3	Melbourne	824,800	▲1.7%

=== International ===
Busiest international routes – Cairns Airport 2024
Rank	Airport	Passengers handled	% change
1	Tokyo	220,520	▼15.5%
2	Osaka	122,139	▼0.8%
3	Singapore	104,793	▲10.2%
4	Denpasar	93,211	▲18.4%
5	Port Moresby	41,702	▲10.1%
6	Auckland	32,069	▲22.5%
7	Christchurch	27,976	New entry
8	Nadi	20,449	New entry
9	Hong Kong	16,900	▲540.9%

=== Cargo ===
Busiest International freight routes of Cairns Airport (*route suspended) (2019)
Rank	Airport	Freight handled (tonnes)	% change
1	Hong Kong	1678.9	▼49
2	Tokyo-Narita	1156.2	▼54
3	Osaka-Kansai	309.9	▼60
4	Port Moresby	252.4	▼15
5*	Shenzhen	145.5	▲60
6*	Guangzhou	108.3	▲60
7	Auckland	68.2	▼20
8	Singapore-Changi	33.5	▲100

== Ground transport ==
=== Taxi ===
Ranks are located near both the International and Domestic Terminals. Cairns Taxis taxi ranks are located immediately outside the International and Domestic Terminals.

=== Bus ===
Airport shuttle bus services to hotels, city centre, Northern Beaches, Palm Cove, Port Douglas and Cape Tribulation are available. On November 23 2026 Kinetic Cairns bus route 100 will be introduced, which run to the CBD every 30 minutes.

=== Parking ===
Short-term and long-term parking, including a covered car park and parking for people with a disability are located within the public carparks adjacent to both the Domestic and International Terminals.

== Accidents and incidents ==
- On 12 August 2024, a 23 year old employee of Nautilus Aviation gained access to a Robinson R44 helicopter at around 1:30 AM and departed from Cairns Airport on an unauthorised flight. The man, who held a New Zealand pilot's licence, made a number of low altitude passes over the Cairns Esplanade before crashing into the roof of the Doubletree by Hilton Cairns. 400 hotel guests were evacuated following with accident, with two treated for smoke inhalation. Investigators found the pilot, who was killed in the accident, was "affected by a significant amount of alcohol" at the time of the flight.

== See also ==
- United States Army Air Forces in Australia (World War II)
- Transportation in Australia
- List of airports in Queensland
