= Gununa, Queensland =

Gununa
- Town
- Coordinates: 16.6657°S 139.1800°E
- Country: Australia
- State: Queensland
- LGA: Shire of Mornington
- Location: 100 km (62 mi) NW of Normanton (direct); 456 km (283 mi) N of Mount Isa; 700 km (430 mi) W of Cairns; 1,867 km (1,160 mi) NW of Brisbane

Government
  - State electorate: Traeger
  - Federal division: Kennedy

Population
  - Total: 1,022 (2021 census)
- Time zone: UTC+10:00 (AEST)
- Postcode: 4892

Gununa, sometimes spelt Gunana, is a rural town on Mornington Island within the locality of Wellesley Islands in the Shire of Mornington, Queensland, Australia. In the 2021 census, the town of Gununa had a population of 1,022 people.

== Geography ==
Gununa is located on the southwestern end of Mornington Island, on the Gulf of Carpentaria. The town faces the Appel Channel, (16.682°S 139.192°E) on the other side of which is Denham Island (16.7144°S 139.1597°E).

== History ==
The town was founded in 1914 as Mornington Island Community, and renamed by the Queensland Place Names Board on 16 January 1982. Gunana or Gununa is a Lardil word.

Mornington Island State School opened on 28 January 1975.

Gununa Post Office was open by 1982.

== Demographics ==
In the 2016 census, the town of Gununa had a population of 1,136 people, which is almost all of the 1,143 people who live within the shire as a whole.

In the 2021 census, the town of Gununa had a population of 1,022 people, which is almost all of the 1,025 people who live within the shire as a whole.

== Education ==
Mornington Island State School is a government-run primary and secondary school for boys and girls from early childhood through Year 10. It is located at Lardil Street (16.6663°S 139.1825°E). In 2018, the school had an enrolment of 263 students, with 25 teachers and 14 part-time and full-time non-teaching staff (the equivalently of 11 full-time employees). It includes a special education program.

There are no schools offering education to Year 12 on the island; nor are there any nearby. Distance education or boarding school are the only options for education past Year 10.

== Amenities ==
Gununa Post Office is in Mukukiya Street (16.6635°S 139.1771°E).

Mornington Island Uniting Church is at 21 Dajibuka Street (16.6635°S 139.1766°E). It is part of the Calvary Presbytery of the Uniting Church in Australia.
