= Doomadgee Airport =

- IATA: DMD; ICAO: YDMG

Summary
- Airport type: Public
- Owner: Doomadgee Community Council
- Serves: Doomadgee, Queensland
- Location: Doomadgee, Queensland, Australia
- Elevation AMSL: 159 ft / 48 m
- Coordinates: 17°56′24″S 138°49′18″E

Map
- Location in Queensland

Runways
| Direction | Length | | Surface |
| Direction | m | ft | Surface |
|---|---|---|---|
| 12/30 | 1,661 | 5,449 | Paved |
- Sources: Australian AIP and aerodrome chart

Doomadgee Airport (IATA: DMD, ICAO: YDMG) is an airport in Doomadgee, Queensland, Australia.

In 2006, the airport received A$200,853 for security upgrades.

== Airlines and destinations ==
| Airlines | Destinations |
|---|---|
| Rex Airlines | Burketown, Cairns, Gununa, Mount Isa, Normanton |

== See also ==
- List of airports in Queensland
