= Townsville Airport =

Airport in Queensland, Australia

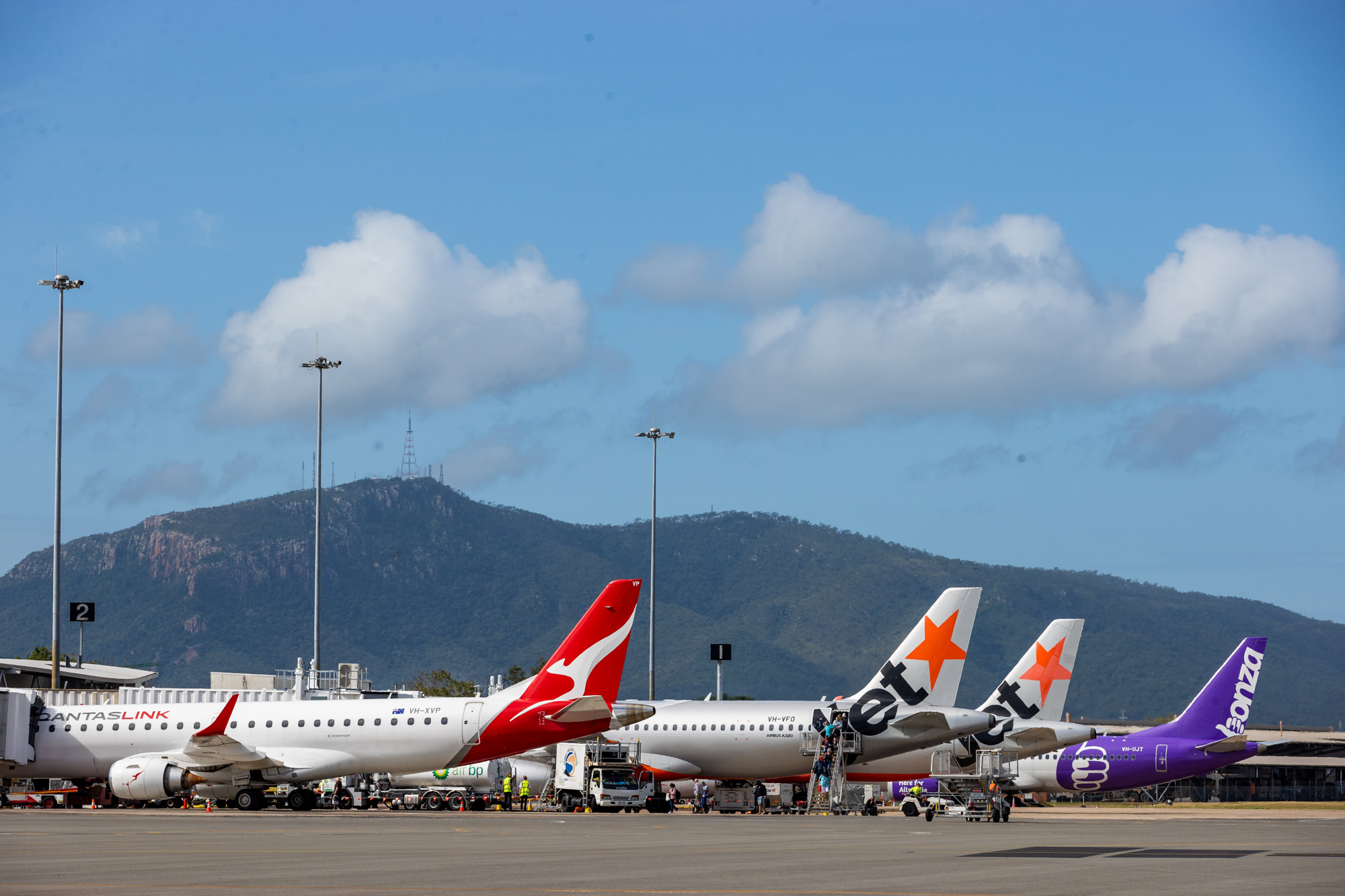
- IATA: TSV; ICAO: YBTL

Summary
- Airport type: Military/Public
- Owner: Queensland Airports Limited
- Operator: Queensland Airports
- Serves: Townsville, Queensland
- Location: Garbutt, Queensland
- Focus city for: ASL Airlines Australia
- Elevation AMSL: 18 ft (5.5 m)
- Coordinates: 19°15′12″S 146°45′54″E
- Website: www.townsvilleairport.com.au

Maps
- Location within Queensland Location within Australia
- Interactive map of Townsville Airport

Runways
Direction	Length		Surface
Direction	m	ft	Surface
01/19	2,438	7,999	Asphalt
07/25	1,100	3,609	Asphalt

Statistics (2010)
- Passengers: 1,644,089
- Source: Enroute Supplement Australia from Airservices Australia

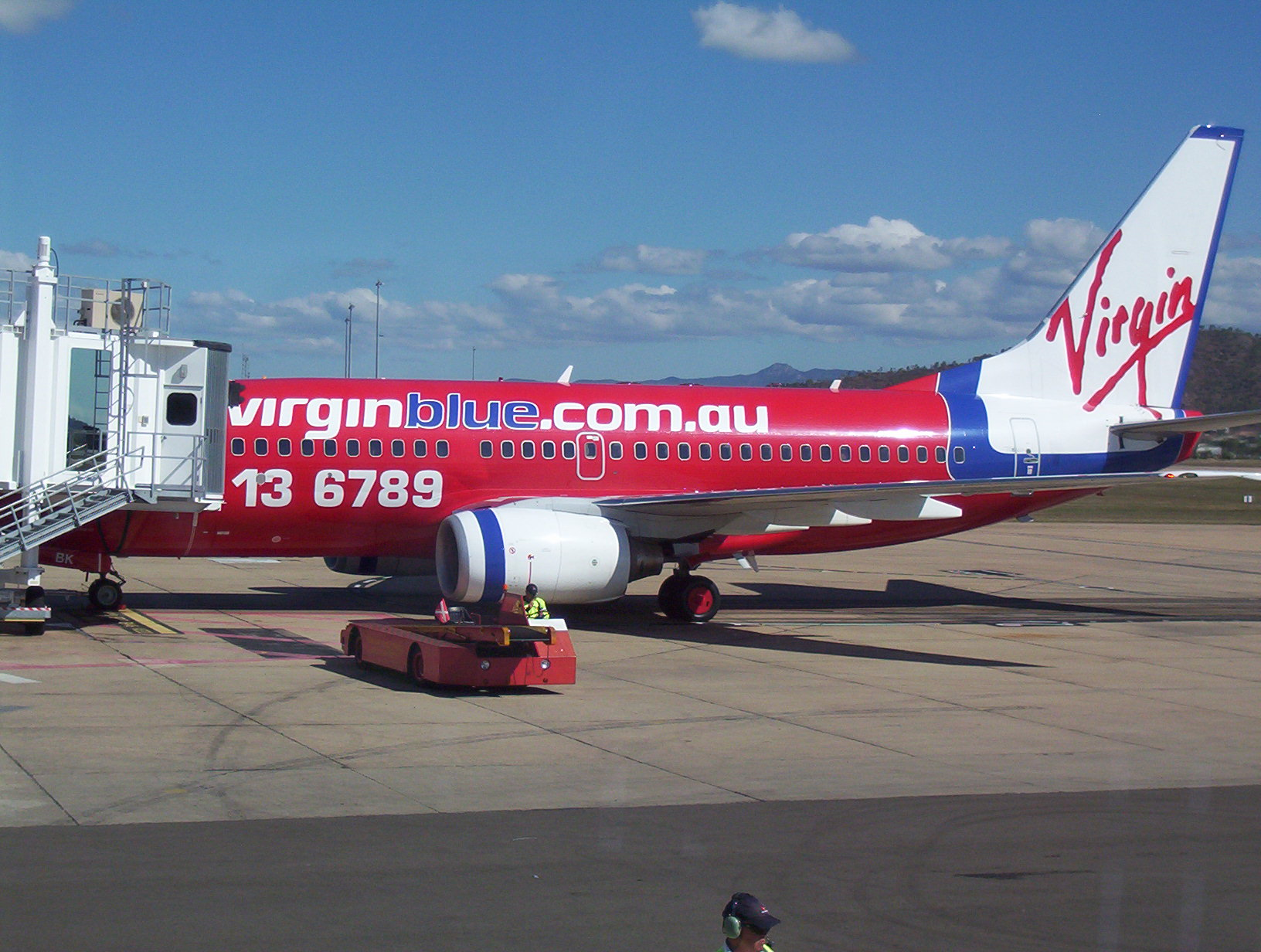
Virgin Blue Boeing 737-700 at Townsville after arriving from Brisbane

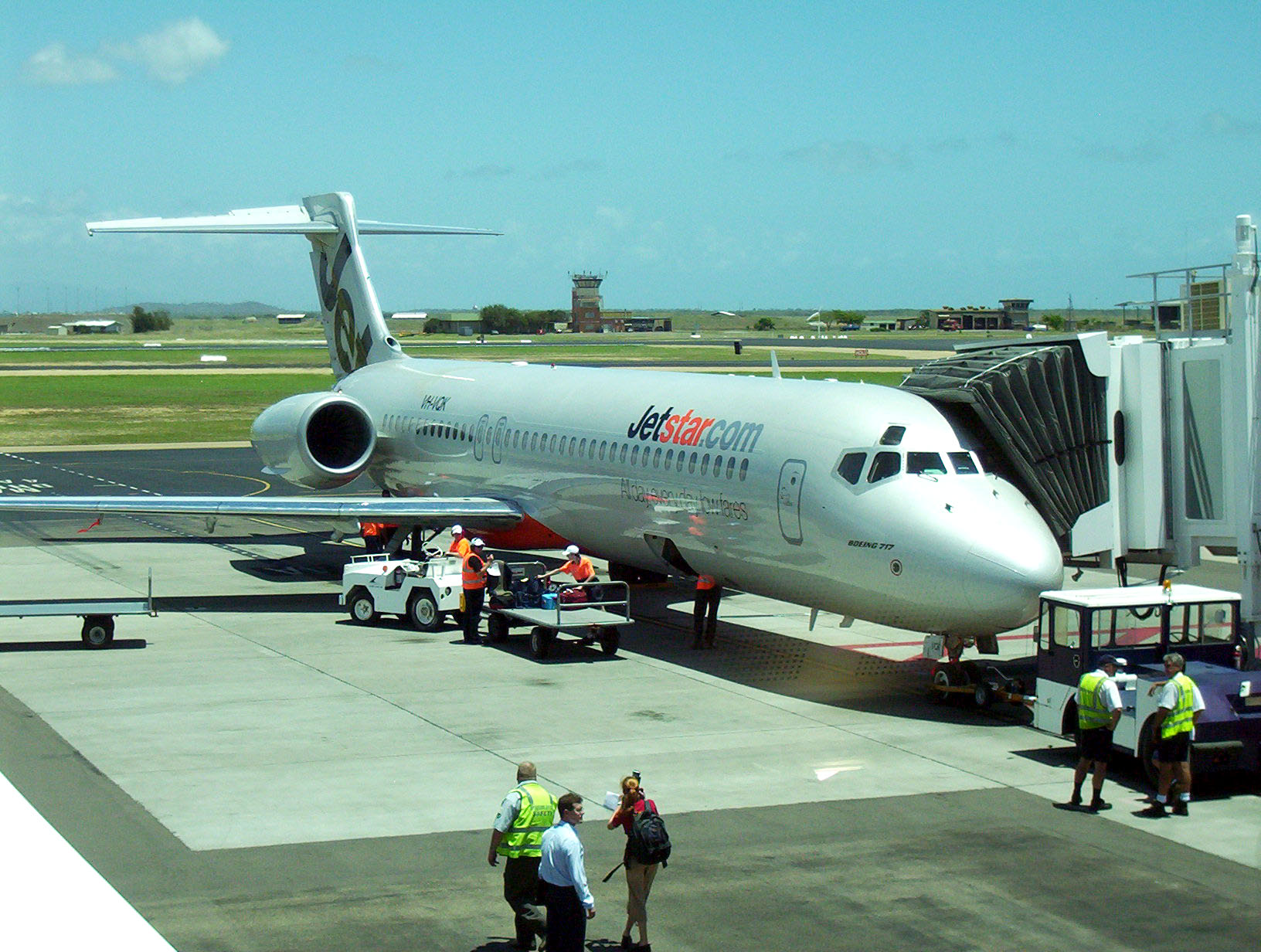
Jetstar Boeing 717 at Townsville Airport, Inaugural Jetstar flight to Townsville

Townsville Airport (IATA: TSV, ICAO: YBTL) is a major Australian regional airport that services the city of Townsville, Queensland. The airport is also known as Townsville International Airport, and Garbutt Airport, a reference to its location in the Townsville suburb of Garbutt. Townsville Airport is serviced by major Australian domestic and regional airlines, and in 2011/12 handled 1.7 million passengers making it the 11th busiest airport in Australia.

Townsville Airport is a common-use civilian and defence facility, sharing access with RAAF Base Townsville. It is used as a staging point for Australian Defence Force (ADF) operations within Australia and internationally. The aerodrome has also been used for co-ordination of relief efforts following Tropical Cyclones and other natural disasters, notably Cyclone Larry in 2006.

The Royal Flying Doctor Service has one of its nine Queensland bases at Townsville Airport.

Townsville Airport was granted international airport status commencing in 1980. International traffic grew substantially through the early 1980s then receded, however, as a result of airline market restructuring, and significant competition with Cairns Airport for regional tourism. The airport then suffered an extended hiatus from handling direct civil international flights with the final Qantas international service in 2002, between Townsville and Singapore via Brisbane using a Boeing 767. From December 2010, the city again handled direct international flights, flown by Air Australia to Bali. These flights ceased with the insolvency of Air Australia, but resumed with Jetstar on 2 September 2015.

It was announced on 11 September 2017, that Jetstar will cancel flights to Denpasar from 21 March 2018 due to low passenger numbers.

On 22 February 2017 Tigerair Australia announced that the airline will start flights to Melbourne later that year on 22 June 2017, Tigerair touched down for the first time in Townsville but one year later it was announced on 3 July 2018 that Tigerair would cease flights to Melbourne on 1 August 2018, due to low passenger numbers.

The airport is located 2 nautical miles (3.7 km; 2.3 mi) west of the Townsville CBD.

== History ==
=== 1920s to World War II ===
The first airport was established in the 1920s in the Thuringowa Shire south of the Ross River, in what is now the suburb of Murray. It was licensed as a civil airport by the Civil Aviation Branch in 1930, but it was never very satisfactory, as the ground was boggy for much of the year, and there was only room for one east–west runway. In 1938 a larger site was selected within the City of Townsville on the Town Common, adjacent to Ingham Road and the North Coast Railway line. Two 800 yd (730 m) gravel runways were constructed, and the new Townsville Airport officially opened on its present site on 1 February 1939.

The Department of Defence was looking for military airfield sites in northern Australia at the time, and almost immediately Townsville Airport was planned for expansion as a Royal Australian Air Force (RAAF) base for three fighter squadrons. The plans were scaled back to one squadron, and RAAF Base Townsville was built alongside the civil airport in early 1940. In October 1940, Number 24 Squadron, flying CAC Wirraways, became the first operational unit to occupy the base. A year later the airfield was greatly expanded to take United States Army Air Corps bombers and transport aircraft reinforcing the Philippines. All three runways were sealed, and the south-east runway was extended to 5,000 ft (1,500 m) to take the heavier aircraft.

During 1942, the defence establishment in the Townsville region increased enormously, and five other military airfields were built in the immediate vicinity of Townsville. To avoid confusion, RAAF Base Townsville was renamed RAAF Base Garbutt, the name of the nearby railway siding, where there were stockyards owned by Garbutt Brothers, wholesale butchers. The civil airport continued to operate during the war, and retained the name Townsville Airport. RAAF Base Garbutt was renamed RAAF Base Townsville in 1951.

=== After World War II to 1990s ===
Townsville Airport experienced a progressive increase in passenger numbers and aircraft movements after World War II, with services operated by Qantas, Trans Australia Airlines (TAA), Australian National Airways (ANA) and Ansett Australia (Ansett) to Brisbane. Types operated were the Australian regional airliners such as the DC-3/4, Convair 240, DC-6, Viscounts, and F-27s, as well smaller charter aircraft such as Ansons. It was not until the mid-1960s that airport growth accelerated. TAA replaced their weekly DC-3 service to Port Moresby and Honiara with more frequent F-27 services, while Ansett operated similarly from Cairns. During that period, TAA and Ansett – ANA gradually increased their jet services starting with DC-9s and then Boeing 727s. Following that period of rapid growth, Townsville was developed as a regional hub for both airlines during the 1970s.

In April 1980, Rupert Murdoch and Sir Peter Abeles, the new owners of Ansett, were petitioning the Federal Government for international flights to begin in some regional centres of Australia. On 18 April 1980, the inaugural Townsville-Singapore flight departed, operated by Ansett, one of the first international flights Ansett had ever operated. In the same year, Townsville Airport was given $13 million by the Australian Government-owned operator, Federal Airports Corporation, to construct and build a new state-of-the-art international terminal. The new terminal was constructed and opened in 1983.

With the new demand for international services, Townsville became the first regional Australian airport to offer direct long-distance international flights. Airlines providing direct services included Qantas, Ansett, Air Niugini, Continental Micronesia, Garuda Indonesia, Air New Zealand, Cathay Pacific and Japan Airlines (JAL). Destinations in Asia included Singapore, Tokyo, Hong Kong; Auckland, Port Moresby and Honolulu in the Pacific; and the North American cities of San Francisco, and Los Angeles. The American flights reflected the significant tourism demand between the United States and Australia at the time. Today many of these services would be considered unrealistic for regional airports, as evidenced by the gradual withdrawal of services from Townsville.

The airport was expanded again in 1987 when a redevelopment of the international terminal opened to cater for domestic traffic. In 1989, the Australian aviation industry was in a crisis with the pilots dispute ceasing nearly all domestic flights in the country. Throughout the period of the strike some international flights continued, and by 1991 most domestic services had returned to normal.

During the 1990s, a new crisis was looming for Townsville International Airport. The airlines began to explore rationalising services in North Queensland. Load factors on international flights were increasing however the number of services was steadily diminishing. The friendly rivalry between Townsville and Cairns with respect to hosting international flights was becoming more serious as the airlines started to rationalise services. Cairns Airport campaigned with a major proposal for improved airport facilities, including a separate international terminal capable of accommodating significantly greater passenger numbers than Townsville's terminal and Cairns' original terminal. In 1993, when Cairns' new terminal opened, all the airlines, except Qantas, Ansett, Cathay Pacific and Garuda, stopped international flights to Townsville, and eventually by 1995 the remaining airlines ceased international flights to Townsville.

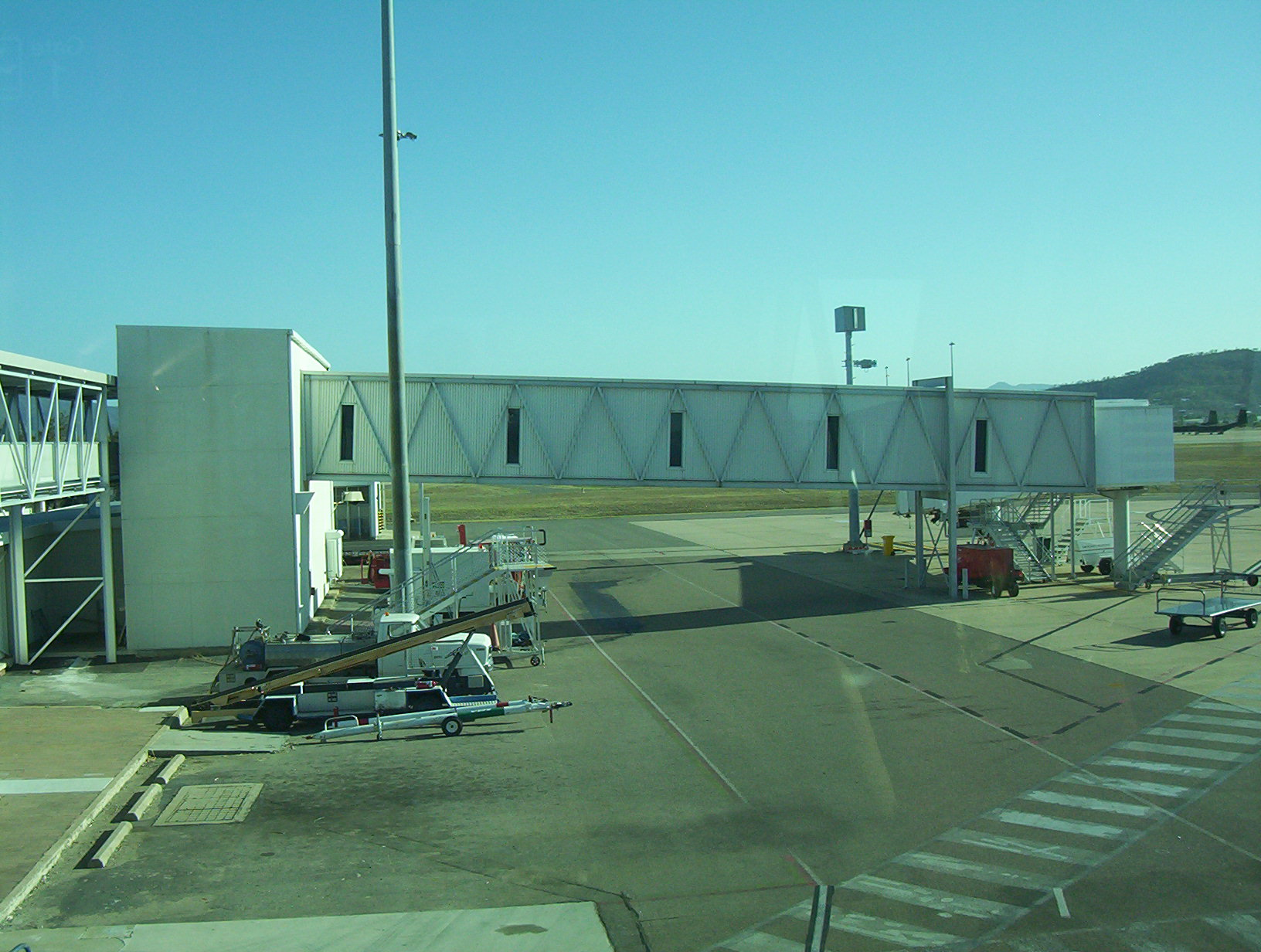
Townsville's International Aerobridge and gate, which was opened in 1981.

In the mid-1990s, domestic flights started to decrease, with some services being cut back by Qantas and Ansett. Qantas began to retire the aircraft type in use on the route to Sydney which resulted in a decrease in services to that city.

=== Since 2000 ===
Services also received a giant drop when Ansett was placed into voluntary liquidation in late 2001. Approximately 40% of Townsville's flights and capacity to Brisbane were cut because of Ansett's financial collapse. The same year also represented the start of a new era in domestic travel for Townsville International Airport: in February 2001, Virgin Blue (now Virgin Australia) made Townsville its first regional destination, and passenger figures rose by 25% that year. Then in June 2001, Qantas announced that the airline would resume international services to Singapore in September. In August, Qantas announced that it would resume Townsville-Sydney services using Boeing 717 aircraft acquired when Qantas bought out Impulse Airlines. When Ansett collapsed, Qantas and Virgin expanded services to exploit the gap that Ansett left.

In August 2002, Qantas ceased the services to Singapore, which had been at times circuitously routed via southern airports such as Brisbane, due to lack of demand. Despite the loss of international services, Virgin Blue, Qantas and a new airline, Alliance Airlines were increasing domestic flights to Townsville, bringing more passengers to the city and increasing domestic tourism to Townsville. Also that year, Australian Airports Limited announced that Townsville domestic terminal would receive a State-of-the-art upgrade and the new redevelopment would open in October 2003. The redevelopment was scheduled to open October 2003 to coincide with the hosting of three Rugby World Cup matches in Townsville, however delays beset the project and the redevelopment finally opened in December 2003. A new international route operated by Air Australia started twice weekly to Denpasar from 3 December 2010, however these services have since been terminated.

On 15 November 2011, Airnorth announced plans to commence services between Townsville & Darwin. The flights began on 17 February 2012, providing a linkage between the two largest Defence communities in Northern Australia.

International services from Townsville recommenced on 2 September 2015, with Jetstar offering three return flights to Denpasar per week on A320 aircraft. They were terminated again on 21 March 2018.

In November 2023, National Jet Express began twice weekly charter flights to Moranbah.

== Airlines and destinations ==
=== Passenger ===
Airlines	Destinations
Airnorth	Darwin
Alliance Airlines	Mining charter: Cairns Trepell, Phosphate Hill
Jetstar	Brisbane, Melbourne, Sydney
National Jet Express	Mining charter: Cairns, Moranbah
Qantas	Brisbane
QantasLink	Brisbane, Cairns, Cloncurry, Mackay, Melbourne, Mount Isa, Rockhampton, Sydney
Rex Airlines (Note: Some Rex services operate under subsidy from the Queensland Government on defined routes with multiple intermediate stops)	Cairns, Hughenden, Julia Creek, Longreach, (Note: Northern 1 route - Townsville-Winton-Longreach) Mount Isa, (Note: Northern 2 route - Townsville-Hughenden-Richmond-Julia Creek-Mount Isa) Richmond, Winton
SmartLynx Australia	Mining charter: Labona Mine
Virgin Australia	Brisbane

=== Cargo ===
Airlines	Destinations
HeavyLift Cargo Airlines	Defence Charter: Darwin, Honiara
Qantas Freight	Brisbane, Cairns
Toll Priority	Sydney

== Accidents and incidents ==
- On 6 September 1971, Douglas C-47B A65-73 of the Royal Australian Air Force was damaged beyond economic repair in an accident at Townsville Airport.

== Statistics ==
Busiest domestic routes out of Townsville Airport (2014–2023)
Rank	Airport	Passengers 2014	Passengers 2015	Passengers 2016	Passengers 2017	Passengers 2018	Passengers 2019	Passengers 2020	Passengers 2021	Passengers 2022	Passengers 2023
1	Queensland, Brisbane	948,200	965,300	976,600	960,200	996,000	1,018,100	509,600	689,100	818,300	872,800
2	New South Wales, Sydney	173,900	166,800	158,400	160,600	169,100	-	-	-	-	-
3	Queensland, Cairns	71,500	139,200	141,800	149,400	-	-	-	-	-	-

== Terminals and facilities ==
=== Layout ===
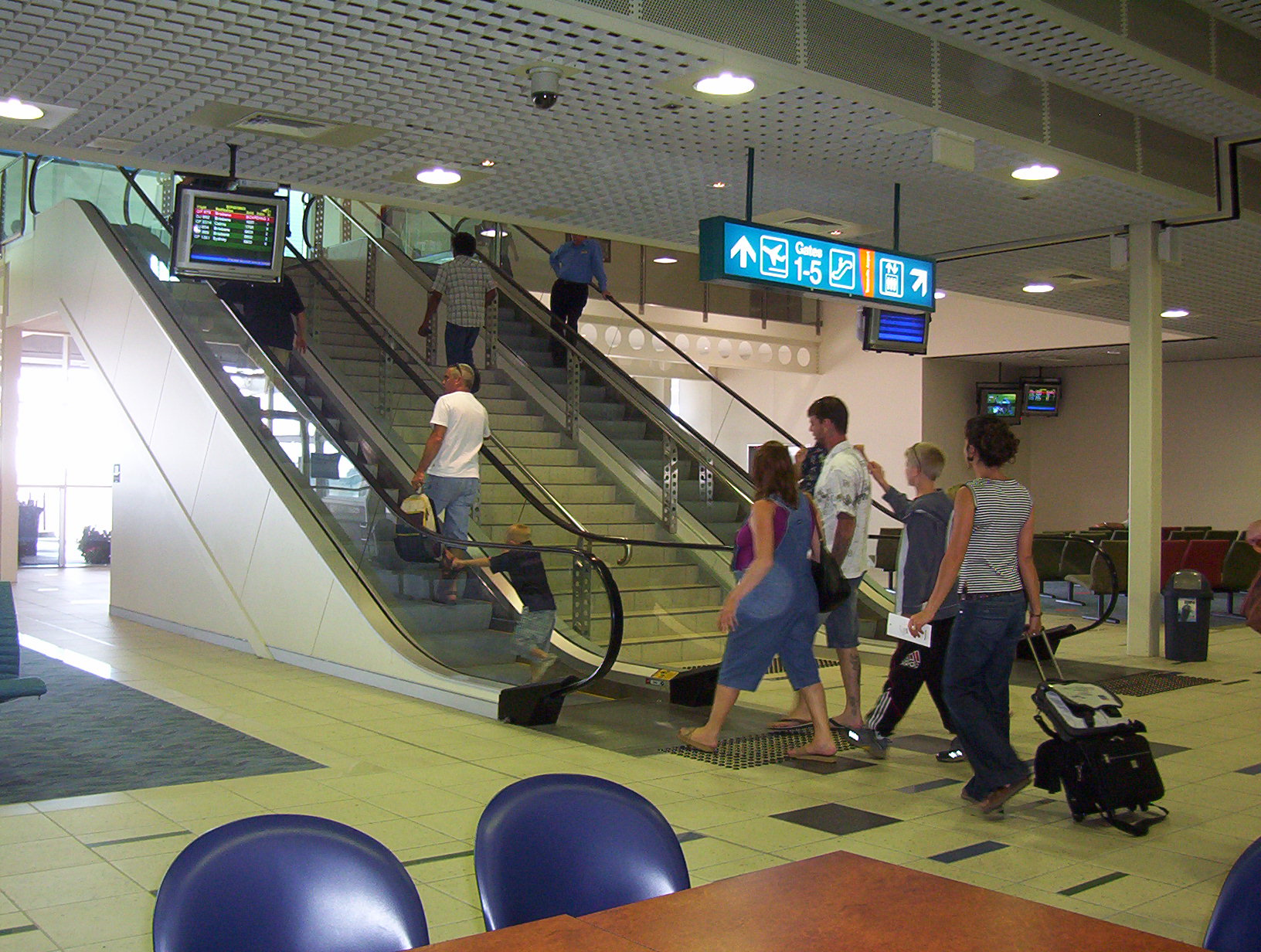
Inside the Departures/Arrivals lounge at Townsville International Airport

Townsville International Airport has an integrated terminal building, with the Southern concourse the international terminal, and the Northern concourse the domestic terminal. The terminal has four aerobridges (1 international, 3 domestic) and three ground level tarmac departure / arrival gates for regional flights at the Northern end of the terminal.

=== Redevelopment ===
In October 2002, redevelopment started on the domestic terminal. It was officially opened on 12 December 2003. The redevelopment was part of a broader modernisation program for the airport.

The project included a new common user departures and arrivals lounge, new modern check-in facilities for Qantas and QantasLink, a new Qantas Club adjacent to the new departures lounge, new retail stores and airside retail space, a new mezzanine level with departure lounges, and three aerobridges for aircraft up to the size of Boeing 767 aircraft.

On 13 December 2003, an "Open Day" was held for Townsville residents to view the new look airport. Later that evening, a Qantas flight from Brisbane became the first arrival to use the new departures/arrivals lounges, and after overnighting in Townsville also became the first departure at 6:05 am (AEST) 14 December 2003, returning to Brisbane.

In 2008 another upgrade project was completed, with an improvement of the check-in desks of the current airlines and an extra two desks built for Virgin Australia. Two of the four entrances into the terminal were redeveloped to improve passenger access, and further upgrades were made to retail space.

Qantas maintains a Qantas Club lounge in the airport terminal, with access for Qantas Club and affiliate members.

The future development of the airport is governed by a 30-year master plan. Projected developments include a new Virgin Australia business lounge, expansion of the International terminal area, and re-development of the entire land-side terminal area.

In May 2015, Townsville Airport announced plans for a $40 million redevelopment of the current terminal to totally reconfigure the layout of the terminal and also slightly expand floor space.

=== Transport ===
The terminal has no direct bus services.

== See also ==
- List of airports in Queensland
- RAAF Base Townsville
