= Century Mine Airport =

- IATA: none; ICAO: YCNY

Summary
- Airport type: Private
- Operator: New Century Resources
- Location: Century Mine
- Elevation AMSL: 416 ft / 127 m
- Coordinates: 18°45′12″S 138°42′24″E

Map
- Location in Queensland

Runways
Direction	Length		Surface
Direction	m	ft	Surface
14/32	1,750	5,741	Asphalt
- Sources: Australian AIP and aerodrome chart

Century Mine Airport (ICAO: YCNY) is an airport serving Century Mine, Queensland, Australia.

== See also ==
- List of airports in Queensland
