= Shire of Mornington (Queensland) =

Coordinates: 20°43′29″S 139°29′37″E

- Local government area
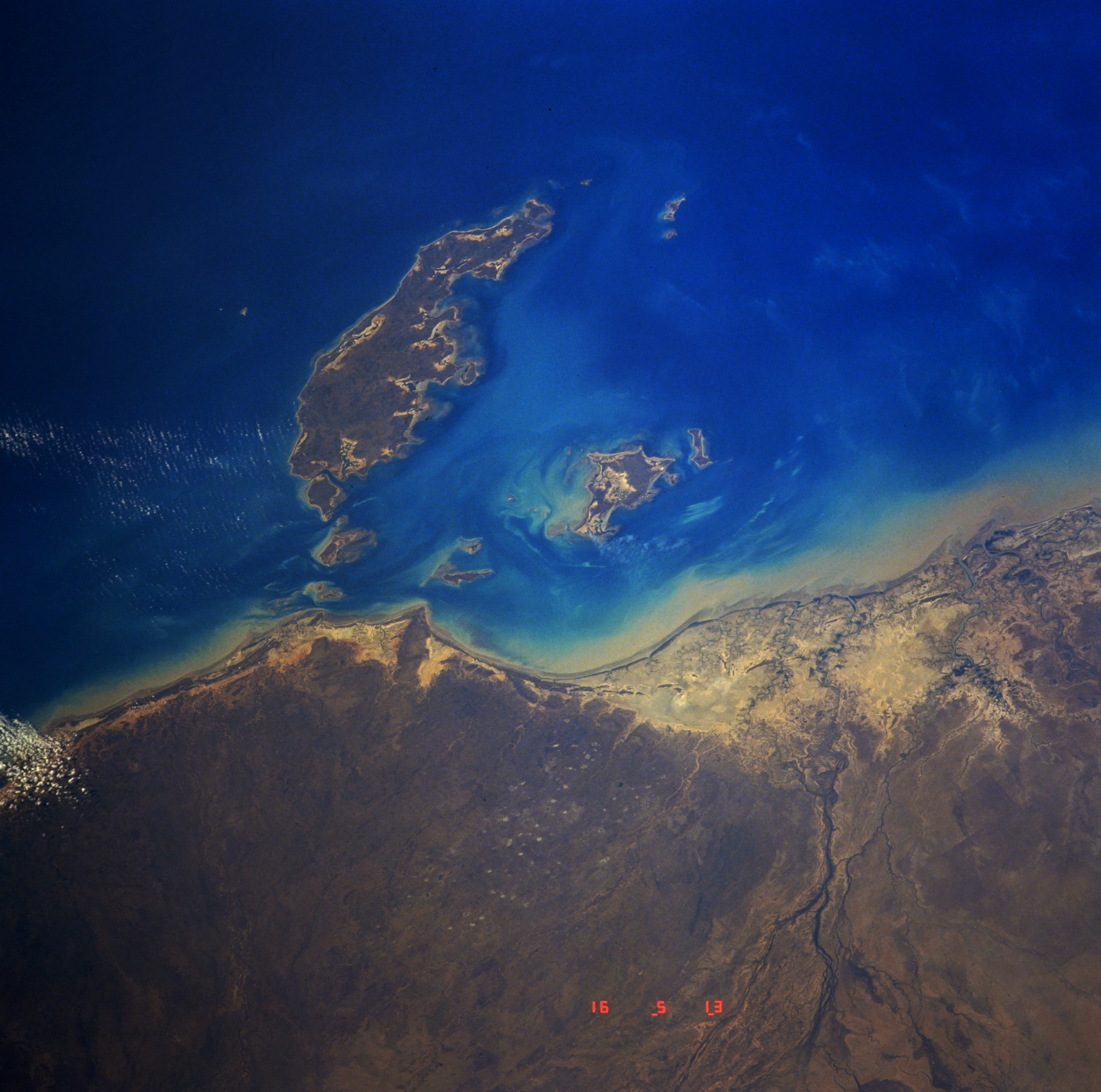
- Mornington Island from space, September 1991

- Interactive map of Shire of Mornington
- Country: Australia
- State: Queensland
- Established: 1978
- Council seat: Gununa

Government
  - Mayor: Kyle Hector Yanner
  - State electorate: Traeger
  - Federal division: Kennedy

Area
  - Total: 1,248 km^{2} (482 sq mi)

Population
  - Total: 1,025 (2021 census)
  - Density: 0.8213/km^{2} (2.1272/sq mi)
- Website: Shire of Mornington
LGAs around Shire of Mornington
Gulf of Carpentaria	Gulf of Carpentaria	Gulf of Carpentaria
Gulf of Carpentaria	Shire of Mornington	Gulf of Carpentaria
Burke	Doomadgee	Burke

The Shire of Mornington is a local government area in northwestern Queensland, Australia. The shire covers the Wellesley Islands, which includes Mornington Island; the South Wellesley Islands; Bountiful Islands; and West Wellesley / Forsyth Islands groups in the Gulf of Carpentaria.

The administrative centre of the shire is the township of Gununa on Mornington Island.

In the 2021 census, the Shire of Mornington had a population of 1,025 people.

== History ==
The shire includes the traditional lands of a number of Aboriginal Australian peoples.

The shire was formed in 1978 when the Queensland Government decided to take control of the islands over from the Uniting Church of Australia. The local community objected, and asked the Australian federal government to help overturn this decision. After negotiations, it was agreed that the community would become self-governing under a so-called "local government" model.

== Geography ==
The Shire Council covers 26 islands, which make up the Wellesley Islands, South Wellesley Islands, Bountiful Islands and Forsyth Islands (also known as West Wellesley) groups.

The area has abundant flora and fauna, including tea trees, mangroves and sea oaks. The beaches are filled with a variety of marine life, including turtles and the endangered dugong. It is a fishing and diving locale with beaches and an emphasis on ecotourism.

== Demographics ==
The islands of the shire are inhabited by the Lardil, Yangkaal, Kaiadilt and Gangalidda peoples. An Australian Aboriginal language, Lardil (also known as Gununa, Ladil), is spoken on Mornington Island and on the Northern Wellesley Islands, all within the Mornington Shire. Another Australian Aboriginal language, Yukulta (also known as Ganggalida), is spoken in the Gulf Country, which includes the local government areas of the Aboriginal Shire of Doomadgee and Shire of Mornington.

In the 2001 census, the Shire of Mornington had a population of 934 people, of whom 88.2% were Indigenous (Aboriginal Australian or Torres Strait Islander).

In the 2006 census, the Shire of Mornington had a population of 1,032 people.

In the 2011 census, the Shire of Mornington had a population of 1,142 people.

In the 2016 census, the Shire of Mornington had a population of 1,143 people, of whom 86.1% were Indigenous Australians.

In the 2021 census, the Shire of Mornington had a population of 1,025 people.

== Amenities ==
The Mornington Shire Council does not operate any public libraries.

== Mayors ==
- 2008–2012: Cecil Goodman
- 2012–2020: Bradley Wilson
- 2020 - present: Kyle Hector Yanner
