= List of airports in Australia =

This is a list of airports in Australia. It includes licensed airports, with the exception of private airports. Aerodromes here are listed with their 4-letter ICAO code, and 3-letter IATA code (where available).

A more extensive list can be found in the En Route Supplement Australia (ERSA), available online from the Airservices Australia web site and in the individual lists for each state or territory.

== Airports ==
ICAO location indicators link to the Aeronautical Information Publication En route Supplement – Australia (ERSA) facilities (FAC) document, where available.

Airport names shown in bold indicate the airport has scheduled passenger service on commercial airlines. The cities shown in bold are international.

=== Australian Capital Territory ===
City served/location	ICAO	IATA	Airport name
**Canberra**	"YSCB" (PDF). AIP En Route Supplement from Airservices Australia. 3 September 2026.	CBR	**Canberra Airport**

=== New South Wales ===
City served/location	ICAO	IATA	Airport name
Albury	"YMAY" (PDF). AIP En Route Supplement from Airservices Australia. 3 September 2026.	ABX	**Albury Airport**
Armidale	"YARM" (PDF). AIP En Route Supplement from Airservices Australia. 3 September 2026.	ARM	**Armidale Airport**
Ballina	"YBNA" (PDF). AIP En Route Supplement from Airservices Australia. 3 September 2026.	BNK	**Ballina Byron Gateway Airport**
Balranald	"YBRN" (PDF). AIP En Route Supplement from Airservices Australia. 3 September 2026.	BZD	Balranald Airport
Bathurst	"YBTH" (PDF). AIP En Route Supplement from Airservices Australia. 3 September 2026.	BHS	Bathurst Airport
Bourke	"YBKE" (PDF). AIP En Route Supplement from Airservices Australia. 3 September 2026.	BRK	**Bourke Airport**
Brewarrina	"YBRW" (PDF). AIP En Route Supplement from Airservices Australia. 3 September 2026.	BWQ	Brewarrina Airport
Broken Hill	"YBHI" (PDF). AIP En Route Supplement from Airservices Australia. 3 September 2026.	BHQ	**Broken Hill Airport**
Camden	"YSCN" (PDF). AIP En Route Supplement from Airservices Australia. 3 September 2026.	CDU	Camden Airport
Cessnock	"YCNK" (PDF). AIP En Route Supplement from Airservices Australia. 3 September 2026.	CES	Cessnock Airport
Cobar	"YCBA" (PDF). AIP En Route Supplement from Airservices Australia. 3 September 2026.	CAZ	**Cobar Airport**
Coffs Harbour	"YCFS" (PDF). AIP En Route Supplement from Airservices Australia. 3 September 2026.	CFS	**Coffs Harbour Airport**
Collarenebri	"YCBR" (PDF). AIP En Route Supplement from Airservices Australia. 3 September 2026.	CRB	Collarenebri Airport
Condobolin	"YCDO" (PDF). AIP En Route Supplement from Airservices Australia. 3 September 2026.	CBX	Condobolin Airport
Coolah	"YCAH" (PDF). AIP En Route Supplement from Airservices Australia. 3 September 2026.	CLH	Coolah Airport
Cooma	"YPFT" (PDF). AIP En Route Supplement from Airservices Australia. 3 September 2026.		Cooma–Polo Flat Airport
Cooma	"YCOM" (PDF). AIP En Route Supplement from Airservices Australia. 3 September 2026.	OOM	**Cooma–Snowy Mountains Airport**
Coonabarabran	"YCBB" (PDF). AIP En Route Supplement from Airservices Australia. 3 September 2026.	COJ	Coonabarabran Airport
Coonamble	"YCNM" (PDF). AIP En Route Supplement from Airservices Australia. 3 September 2026.	CNB	Coonamble Airport
Cootamundra	"YCTM" (PDF). AIP En Route Supplement from Airservices Australia. 3 September 2026.	CMD	Cootamundra Airport
Corowa	"YCOR" (PDF). AIP En Route Supplement from Airservices Australia. 3 September 2026.	CWW	Corowa Airport
Cowra	"YCWR" (PDF). AIP En Route Supplement from Airservices Australia. 3 September 2026.	CWT	Cowra Airport
Deniliquin	"YDLQ" (PDF). AIP En Route Supplement from Airservices Australia. 3 September 2026.	DNQ	Deniliquin Airport
Dubbo	"YSDU" (PDF). AIP En Route Supplement from Airservices Australia. 3 September 2026.	DBO	**Dubbo Regional Airport**
Evans Head	"YEVD" (PDF). AIP En Route Supplement from Airservices Australia. 3 September 2026.	EVH	Evans Head Memorial Aerodrome
Finley	YFIL	FLY	Finley Airport
Forbes	"YFBS" (PDF). AIP En Route Supplement from Airservices Australia. 3 September 2026.	FRB	Forbes Airport
Forster / Wallis Island	YFST	FOT	Forster – Wallis Island Airport
Glen Innes	"YGLI" (PDF). AIP En Route Supplement from Airservices Australia. 3 September 2026.	GLI	Glen Innes Airport
Goodooga	"YGDA" (PDF). AIP En Route Supplement from Airservices Australia. 3 September 2026.		Goodooga Airport
Goulburn	"YGLB" (PDF). AIP En Route Supplement from Airservices Australia. 3 September 2026.	GUL	Goulburn Airport
Grafton / Clarence Valley	"YGFN" (PDF). AIP En Route Supplement from Airservices Australia. 3 September 2026.	GFN	Clarence Valley Regional Airport
Griffith	"YGTH" (PDF). AIP En Route Supplement from Airservices Australia. 3 September 2026.	GFF	**Griffith Airport**
Gunnedah	"YGDH" (PDF). AIP En Route Supplement from Airservices Australia. 3 September 2026.	GUH	Gunnedah Airport
Hay	"YHAY" (PDF). AIP En Route Supplement from Airservices Australia. 3 September 2026.	HXX	Hay Airport
Inverell	"YIVL" (PDF). AIP En Route Supplement from Airservices Australia. 3 September 2026.	IVR	**Inverell Airport**
Katoomba / Medlow Bath	"YKAT" (PDF). AIP En Route Supplement from Airservices Australia. 3 September 2026.		Katoomba Airport
Kempsey	"YKMP" (PDF). AIP En Route Supplement from Airservices Australia. 3 September 2026.	KPS	Kempsey Airport
Lake Macquarie / Pelican	"YLMQ" (PDF). AIP En Route Supplement from Airservices Australia. 3 September 2026.	BEO	Lake Macquarie Airport (formerly Belmont Airport)
Lightning Ridge	"YLRD" (PDF). AIP En Route Supplement from Airservices Australia. 3 September 2026.	LHG	**Lightning Ridge Airport**
Lismore	"YLIS" (PDF). AIP En Route Supplement from Airservices Australia. 3 September 2026.	LSY	Lismore Airport
Lord Howe Island	"YLHI" (PDF). AIP En Route Supplement from Airservices Australia. 3 September 2026.	LDH	**Lord Howe Island Airport**
Maitland	"YMND" (PDF). AIP En Route Supplement from Airservices Australia. 3 September 2026.	MTL	Maitland Airport
Merimbula	"YMER" (PDF). AIP En Route Supplement from Airservices Australia. 3 September 2026.	MIM	**Merimbula Airport**
Moree	"YMOR" (PDF). AIP En Route Supplement from Airservices Australia. 3 September 2026.	MRZ	**Moree Airport**
Moruya	"YMRY" (PDF). AIP En Route Supplement from Airservices Australia. 3 September 2026.	MYA	**Moruya Airport**
Mudgee	"YMDG" (PDF). AIP En Route Supplement from Airservices Australia. 3 September 2026.	DGE	**Mudgee Airport**
Mungindi	"YMGI" (PDF). AIP En Route Supplement from Airservices Australia. 3 September 2026.		Mungindi Airport
Nambucca Heads	YNHS	NBH	Nambucca Heads Airport
Narrabri	"YNBR" (PDF). AIP En Route Supplement from Airservices Australia. 3 September 2026.	NAA	**Narrabri Airport**
Narrandera	"YNAR" (PDF). AIP En Route Supplement from Airservices Australia. 3 September 2026.	NRA	**Narrandera Airport**
Narromine	"YNRM" (PDF). AIP En Route Supplement from Airservices Australia. 3 September 2026.		Narromine Airport
**Newcastle** / Williamtown	"YWLM" (PDF). AIP En Route Supplement from Airservices Australia. 3 September 2026.	NTL	**Newcastle Airport** (RAAF Williamtown)
Nyngan	"YNYN" (PDF). AIP En Route Supplement from Airservices Australia. 3 September 2026.	NYN	Nyngan Airport
Orange / Spring Hill	"YORG" (PDF). AIP En Route Supplement from Airservices Australia. 3 September 2026.	OAG	**Orange Airport**
Palm Beach, Sydney		LBH	Palm Beach Water Airport
Parkes	"YPKS" (PDF). AIP En Route Supplement from Airservices Australia. 3 September 2026.	PKE	**Parkes Airport**
Pooncarie	"YPCE" (PDF). AIP En Route Supplement from Airservices Australia. 3 September 2026.		Pooncarie Airport
Port Macquarie	"YPMQ" (PDF). AIP En Route Supplement from Airservices Australia. 3 September 2026.	PQQ	**Port Macquarie Airport**
Quirindi	"YQDI" (PDF). AIP En Route Supplement from Airservices Australia. 3 September 2026.	UIR	Quirindi Airport
Rylstone	"YRYL" (PDF). AIP En Route Supplement from Airservices Australia. 3 September 2026.		Rylstone Aerodrome
Scone	"YSCO" (PDF). AIP En Route Supplement from Airservices Australia. 3 September 2026.	NSO	Scone Airport
Shellharbour City	"YSHL" (PDF). AIP En Route Supplement from Airservices Australia. 3 September 2026.	WOL	**Shellharbour Airport**
Somersby	"YSMB" (PDF). AIP En Route Supplement from Airservices Australia. 3 September 2026.		Somersby Airfield
Sydney / Bankstown	"YSBK" (PDF). AIP En Route Supplement from Airservices Australia. 3 September 2026.	BWU	Bankstown Airport
**Sydney** / Mascot	"YSSY" (PDF). AIP En Route Supplement from Airservices Australia. 3 September 2026.	SYD	**Sydney Airport**
Sydney / Rose Bay	"YRAY" (PDF). AIP En Route Supplement from Airservices Australia. 3 September 2026.	RSE	Rose Bay Water Airport
**Sydney** / Badgerys Creek	"YSWS" (PDF). AIP En Route Supplement from Airservices Australia. 3 September 2026.	WSI	Western Sydney Airport
Tamworth	"YSTW" (PDF). AIP En Route Supplement from Airservices Australia. 3 September 2026.	TMW	**Tamworth Airport**
Taree	"YTRE" (PDF). AIP En Route Supplement from Airservices Australia. 3 September 2026.	TRO	Taree Airport
Temora	"YTEM" (PDF). AIP En Route Supplement from Airservices Australia. 3 September 2026.	TEM	Temora Airport
Tibooburra	"YTIB" (PDF). AIP En Route Supplement from Airservices Australia. 3 September 2026.	TYB	Tibooburra Airport
Tocumwal	"YTOC" (PDF). AIP En Route Supplement from Airservices Australia. 3 September 2026.	TCW	Tocumwal Airport
Tumut	"YTMU" (PDF). AIP En Route Supplement from Airservices Australia. 3 September 2026.	TUM	Tumut Airport
Wagga Wagga	"YSWG" (PDF). AIP En Route Supplement from Airservices Australia. 3 September 2026.	WGA	**Wagga Wagga Airport** (RAAF Base Wagga)
Walcha	"YWCH" (PDF). AIP En Route Supplement from Airservices Australia. 3 September 2026.	WLC	Walcha Airport
Walgett	"YWLG" (PDF). AIP En Route Supplement from Airservices Australia. 3 September 2026.	WGE	**Walgett Airport**
Warnervale / Central Coast	"YWVA" (PDF). AIP En Route Supplement from Airservices Australia. 3 September 2026.		Warnervale Airport
Warren / Red Hill	"YWRN" (PDF). AIP En Route Supplement from Airservices Australia. 3 September 2026.		Warren Airport
West Wyalong	"YWWL" (PDF). AIP En Route Supplement from Airservices Australia. 3 September 2026.	WWY	West Wyalong Airport
Wilcannia	"YWCA" (PDF). AIP En Route Supplement from Airservices Australia. 3 September 2026.	WIO	Wilcannia Airport
Young	"YYNG" (PDF). AIP En Route Supplement from Airservices Australia. 3 September 2026.	NGA	Young Airport

=== Northern Territory ===
City served/location	ICAO	IATA	Airport name
Alexandria Station	YALX	AXL	Alexandria Station Airport
Alice Springs	"YBAS" (PDF). AIP En Route Supplement from Airservices Australia. 3 September 2026.	ASP	**Alice Springs Airport**
Alroy Downs		AYD	Alroy Downs Airport
Ammaroo	YAMM	AMX	Ammaroo Airport
Angas Downs	YADN	ANZ	Angas Downs Airport
Anthony Lagoon	YANL	AYL	Anthony Lagoon Airport
Aputula	YFNE	FIK	Finke Airport
Austral Downs Station	YAUS	AWP	Austral Downs Station Airport
Auvergne Station	YAUV	AVG	Auvergne Station Airport
Baniyala		BYX	Baniyala Airport
Barkly Downs	YBAW	BKP	Barkly Downs Airport
Bathurst Island	"YBTI" (PDF). AIP En Route Supplement from Airservices Australia. 3 September 2026.	BRT	**Bathurst Island Airport**
Belyuen Shire	"YDLV" (PDF). AIP En Route Supplement from Airservices Australia. 3 September 2026.	DLV	Delissaville Airport
Borroloola	"YBRL" (PDF). AIP En Route Supplement from Airservices Australia. 3 September 2026.	BOX	Borroloola Airport
Bickerton Island / Milyakburra		BCZ	Bickerton Island Airport / Milyakburra Airport
Brunette Downs		BTD	Brunette Downs Airport
Camfield Station	YCFD	CFI	Camfield Station Airport
Coolibah		COB	Coolibah Airport
Cresswell Downs		CSD	Cresswell Downs Airport
Croker Island	"YCKI" (PDF). AIP En Route Supplement from Airservices Australia. 3 September 2026.	CKI	**Croker Island Airport**
Daguragu	"YKKG" (PDF). AIP En Route Supplement from Airservices Australia. 3 September 2026.	KFG	Kalkgurung Airport
Daly River Mission	YDMN	DVR	Daly River Mission Airport
Daly Waters	YDLW	DYW	Daly Waters Airport
**Darwin**	"YPDN" (PDF). AIP En Route Supplement from Airservices Australia. 3 September 2026.	DRW	**Darwin International Airport** (RAAF Darwin)
Elcho Island	"YELD" (PDF). AIP En Route Supplement from Airservices Australia. 3 September 2026.	ELC	**Elcho Island Airport**
Elkedra		EKD	Elkedra Airport
Erldunda		EDD	Erldunda Airport
Eva Downs	YEVA	EVD	Eva Downs Airport
Gapuwiyak (Lake Evella)	"YLEV" (PDF). AIP En Route Supplement from Airservices Australia. 3 September 2026.	LEL	**Lake Evella Airport**
Goulburn Islands	"YGBI" (PDF). AIP En Route Supplement from Airservices Australia. 3 September 2026.	GBL	**South Goulburn Island Airport**
The Granites	"YTGT" (PDF). AIP En Route Supplement from Airservices Australia. 3 September 2026.	GTS	**The Granites Airport**
Groote Eylandt (Alyangula)	"YGTE" (PDF). AIP En Route Supplement from Airservices Australia. 3 September 2026.	GTE	**Groote Eylandt Airport**
Gunbalanya (Oenpelli)	"YOEN" (PDF). AIP En Route Supplement from Airservices Australia. 3 September 2026.	OPI	Oenpelli Airport
Henbury	YHBY	HRY	Henbury Airport
Hermannsburg	"YHMB" (PDF). AIP En Route Supplement from Airservices Australia. 3 September 2026.	HMG	Hermannsburg Airport
Humbert River	YHBR	HUB	Humbert River Airport
Inverway	YINW	IVW	Inverway Airport
Jabiru	"YJAB" (PDF). AIP En Route Supplement from Airservices Australia. 3 September 2026.	JAB	Jabiru Airport
Kalkarindji	"YWAV" (PDF). AIP En Route Supplement from Airservices Australia. 3 September 2026.	WAV	Wave Hill Airport
Kaltukatjara	"YDVR" (PDF). AIP En Route Supplement from Airservices Australia. 3 September 2026.	DKV	Docker River Airport
Katherine	"YPTN" (PDF). AIP En Route Supplement from Airservices Australia. 3 September 2026.	KTR	**Katherine Tindal Airport**
Kings Canyon	YKCA	KBJ	Kings Canyon Airport
Kings Creek	"YKCS" (PDF). AIP En Route Supplement from Airservices Australia. 3 September 2026.	KCS	Kings Creek Station Airport
Kirkimbie		KBB	Kirkimbie Airport
Kulgera		KGR	Kulgera Airport
Kurundi		KRD	Kurundi Airport
Lajamanu	"YHOO" (PDF). AIP En Route Supplement from Airservices Australia. 3 September 2026.	HOK	Hooker Creek Airport
Lake Nash	YLKN	LNH	Lake Nash Airport
Limbunya		LIB	Limbunya Airport
Lissadell		LLL	Lissadell Airport
MacDonald Downs	YMDS	MNW	MacDonald Downs Airport
Mainoru		MIZ	Mainoru Airport
Maningrida	"YMGD" (PDF). AIP En Route Supplement from Airservices Australia. 3 September 2026.	MNG	**Maningrida Airport**
Manners Creek Station	YMCR	MFP	Manners Creek Station Airport
Marqua	YMQA	MQE	Marqua Airport
McArthur River Mine	"YMHU" (PDF). AIP En Route Supplement from Airservices Australia. 3 September 2026.	MCV	**McArthur River Mine Airport**
Milikapiti (Melville Island)	"YSNK" (PDF). AIP En Route Supplement from Airservices Australia. 3 September 2026.	SNB	**Snake Bay Airport**
Milingimbi	"YMGB" (PDF). AIP En Route Supplement from Airservices Australia. 3 September 2026.	MGT	**Milingimbi Airport**
Mittiebah		MIY	Mittiebah Airport
Moroak		MRT	Moroak Airport
Mount Cavenagh / Ghan	YMVG	MKV	Mount Cavenagh Airport
Mount Sandford Station	"YMSF" (PDF). AIP En Route Supplement from Airservices Australia. 3 September 2026.	MTD	Mount Sandford Station Airport
Mount Swan	YMNS	MSF	Mount Swan Airport
Mount Valley		MNV	Mount Valley Airport
Mulga Park	YMUP	MUP	Mulga Park Airport
Napperby		NPP	Napperby Airport
Newry		NRY	Newry Airport
Ngukurr	"YNGU" (PDF). AIP En Route Supplement from Airservices Australia. 3 September 2026.	RPM	**Ngukurr Airport**
Nhulunbuy	"YPGV" (PDF). AIP En Route Supplement from Airservices Australia. 3 September 2026.	GOV	**Gove Airport**
Numbulwar	"YNUM" (PDF). AIP En Route Supplement from Airservices Australia. 3 September 2026.	NUB	Numbulwar Airport
Nutwood Downs		UTD	Nutwood Downs Airport
Peppimenarti		PEP	Peppimenarti Airport
Pularumpi (Melville Island)	"YGPT" (PDF). AIP En Route Supplement from Airservices Australia. 3 September 2026.	GPN	**Garden Point Airport**
Ramingining	"YRNG" (PDF). AIP En Route Supplement from Airservices Australia. 3 September 2026.	RAM	**Ramingining Airport**
Robinson River		RRV	Robinson River Airport
Roper Bar	YRRB	RPB	Roper Bar Airport
Roper Valley		RPV	Roper Valley Airport
Smith Point	YSMP	SHU	Smith Point Airport
Tennant Creek	"YTNK" (PDF). AIP En Route Supplement from Airservices Australia. 3 September 2026.	TCA	**Tennant Creek Airport**
Timber Creek	"YTBR" (PDF). AIP En Route Supplement from Airservices Australia. 3 September 2026.	TBK	Timber Creek Airport
Ti-Tree	YTIT		Ti-Tree Airfield
Tobermorey	YTMY	TYP	Tobermorey Airport
Uluru / Yulara	"YAYE" (PDF). AIP En Route Supplement from Airservices Australia. 3 September 2026.	AYQ	**Ayers Rock Airport** (Connellan Airport)
Victoria River Downs	"YVRD" (PDF). AIP En Route Supplement from Airservices Australia. 3 September 2026.	VCD	Victoria River Downs Airport
Wadeye	"YPKT" (PDF). AIP En Route Supplement from Airservices Australia. 3 September 2026.	PKT	Port Keats Airfield
Wollogorang	YWOR	WLL	Wollogorang Airport
Yuendumu	"YYND" (PDF). AIP En Route Supplement from Airservices Australia. 3 September 2026.	YUE	Yuendumu Airport

=== Queensland ===
City served/location	ICAO	IATA	Airport name
Abingdon	YABI	ABG	Abingdon Downs Airport
Agnew		AGW	Agnew Airport
Alpha	"YAPH" (PDF). AIP En Route Supplement from Airservices Australia. 3 September 2026.	ABH	Alpha Airport
Aramac	"YAMC" (PDF). AIP En Route Supplement from Airservices Australia. 3 September 2026.	AXC	Aramac Airport
Arrabury	"YARY" (PDF). AIP En Route Supplement from Airservices Australia. 3 September 2026.	AAB	Arrabury Airport
Augustus Downs	"YAGD" (PDF). AIP En Route Supplement from Airservices Australia. 3 September 2026.	AUD	Augustus Downs Airport
Aurukun	"YAUR" (PDF). AIP En Route Supplement from Airservices Australia. 3 September 2026.	AUU	**Aurukun Airport**
Ayr	"YAYR" (PDF). AIP En Route Supplement from Airservices Australia. 3 September 2026.	AYR	Ayr Airport
Badu Island	"YBAU" (PDF). AIP En Route Supplement from Airservices Australia. 3 September 2026.	BDD	Badu Island Airport
Ballera gas plant	"YLLE" (PDF). AIP En Route Supplement from Airservices Australia. 3 September 2026.	BBL	Ballera Airport
Bamaga	"YNPE" (PDF). AIP En Route Supplement from Airservices Australia. 3 September 2026.	ABM	**Northern Peninsula Airport** (Bamaga/Injinoo Airport)
Barcaldine	"YBAR" (PDF). AIP En Route Supplement from Airservices Australia. 3 September 2026.	BCI	**Barcaldine Airport**
Batavia Downs		BVW	Batavia Downs Airport
Bedourie	"YBIE" (PDF). AIP En Route Supplement from Airservices Australia. 3 September 2026.	BEU	**Bedourie Airport**
Betoota	"YBEO" (PDF). AIP En Route Supplement from Airservices Australia. 3 September 2026.	BTX	Betoota Airport
Biloela		ZBL	Biloela Airport
Birdsville	"YBDV" (PDF). AIP En Route Supplement from Airservices Australia. 3 September 2026.	BVI	**Birdsville Airport**
Bizant		BZP	Bizant Airport
Blackall	"YBCK" (PDF). AIP En Route Supplement from Airservices Australia. 3 September 2026.	BKQ	**Blackall Airport**
Blackwater	"YBTR" (PDF). AIP En Route Supplement from Airservices Australia. 3 September 2026.	BLT	Blackwater Airport
Bloomfield River Mission / Wujal Wujal		BFC	Bloomfield River Airport
Boigu Island	"YBOI" (PDF). AIP En Route Supplement from Airservices Australia. 3 September 2026.	GIC	**Boigu Island Airport**
Bollon	"YBLL" (PDF). AIP En Route Supplement from Airservices Australia. 3 September 2026.	BLS	Bollon Airport
Bolwarra	YBWR	BCK	Bolwarra Airport
Boulia	"YBOU" (PDF). AIP En Route Supplement from Airservices Australia. 3 September 2026.	BQL	**Boulia Airport**
Bowen	"YBWN" (PDF). AIP En Route Supplement from Airservices Australia. 3 September 2026.	ZBO	Bowen Airport
Brampton Island	"YBPI" (PDF). AIP En Route Supplement from Airservices Australia. 3 September 2026.	BMP	Brampton Island Airport
Brighton Downs		BHT	Brighton Downs Airport
**Brisbane**	"YBBN" (PDF). AIP En Route Supplement from Airservices Australia. 3 September 2026.	BNE	**Brisbane Airport**
Brisbane/ Archerfield	"YBAF" (PDF). AIP En Route Supplement from Airservices Australia. 3 September 2026.		Archerfield Airport
Bulimba	YBWM	BIP	Bulimba Airport
Bundaberg	"YBUD" (PDF). AIP En Route Supplement from Airservices Australia. 3 September 2026.	BDB	**Bundaberg Airport**
Burketown	"YBKT" (PDF). AIP En Route Supplement from Airservices Australia. 3 September 2026.	BUC	**Burketown Airport**
Caboolture	YCAB		Caboolture Airfield
Canobie	YCBE	CBY	Canobie Airport
**Cairns**	"YBCS" (PDF). AIP En Route Supplement from Airservices Australia. 3 September 2026.	CNS	**Cairns Airport**
Caloundra West / Sunshine Coast	"YCDR" (PDF). AIP En Route Supplement from Airservices Australia. 3 September 2026.	CUD	Caloundra Airport
Camooweal	"YCMW" (PDF). AIP En Route Supplement from Airservices Australia. 3 September 2026.	CML	Camooweal Airport
Cape Flattery		CQP	Cape Flattery Airport
Carpentaria Downs		CFP	Carpentaria Downs Airport
Charleville	"YBCV" (PDF). AIP En Route Supplement from Airservices Australia. 3 September 2026.	CTL	**Charleville Airport**
Charters Towers	"YCHT" (PDF). AIP En Route Supplement from Airservices Australia. 3 September 2026.	CXT	Charters Towers Airport
Cherrabah		CRH	Cherrabah Airport
Chillagoe	"YCGO" (PDF). AIP En Route Supplement from Airservices Australia. 3 September 2026.	LLG	Chillagoe Airport
Chinchilla	"YCCA" (PDF). AIP En Route Supplement from Airservices Australia. 3 September 2026.	CCL	Chinchilla Airport
Clermont	"YCMT" (PDF). AIP En Route Supplement from Airservices Australia. 3 September 2026.	CMQ	Clermont Airport
Cloncurry	"YCCY" (PDF). AIP En Route Supplement from Airservices Australia. 3 September 2026.	CNJ	**Cloncurry Airport**
Cluny	"YUNY" (PDF). AIP En Route Supplement from Airservices Australia. 3 September 2026.	CZY	Cluny Airport
Coconut Island	"YCCT" (PDF). AIP En Route Supplement from Airservices Australia. 3 September 2026.	CNC	**Coconut Island Airport**
Coen	"YCOE" (PDF). AIP En Route Supplement from Airservices Australia. 3 September 2026.	CUQ	Coen Airport
Collinsville	"YCSV" (PDF). AIP En Route Supplement from Airservices Australia. 3 September 2026.	KCE	Collinsville Airport
Cooinda	"YCOO" (PDF). AIP En Route Supplement from Airservices Australia. 3 September 2026.	CDA	Cooinda Airport
Cooktown	"YCKN" (PDF). AIP En Route Supplement from Airservices Australia. 3 September 2026.	CTN	**Cooktown Airport**
Croydon	"YCRY" (PDF). AIP En Route Supplement from Airservices Australia. 3 September 2026.	CDQ	Croydon Airport
Cunnamulla	"YCMU" (PDF). AIP En Route Supplement from Airservices Australia. 3 September 2026.	CMA	**Cunnamulla Airport**
Dalby	"YDAY" (PDF). AIP En Route Supplement from Airservices Australia. 3 September 2026.	DBY	Dalby Airport
Darnley Island	"YDNI" (PDF). AIP En Route Supplement from Airservices Australia. 3 September 2026.	NLF	**Darnley Island Airport**
Davenport Downs	"YDPD" (PDF). AIP En Route Supplement from Airservices Australia. 3 September 2026.	DVP	Davenport Downs Airport
Delta Downs	"YDLT" (PDF). AIP En Route Supplement from Airservices Australia. 3 September 2026.	DDN	Delta Downs Airport
Diamantina Lakes		DYM	Diamantina Lakes Airport
Dirranbandi	"YDBI" (PDF). AIP En Route Supplement from Airservices Australia. 3 September 2026.	DRN	Dirranbandi Airport
Dixie	YDIX	DXD	Dixie Airport
Doomadgee	"YDMG" (PDF). AIP En Route Supplement from Airservices Australia. 3 September 2026.	DMD	**Doomadgee Airport**
Dorunda	"YDOR" (PDF). AIP En Route Supplement from Airservices Australia. 3 September 2026.	DRD	Dorunda Airport
Drumduff	YDDF	DFP	Drumduff Airport
Dunbar	"YDBR" (PDF). AIP En Route Supplement from Airservices Australia. 3 September 2026.	DNB	Dunbar Airport
Dunk Island	"YDKI" (PDF). AIP En Route Supplement from Airservices Australia. 3 September 2026.	DKI	Dunk Island Airport
Dunwich		SRR	Dunwich Airport
Durham Downs	"YDRH" (PDF). AIP En Route Supplement from Airservices Australia. 3 September 2026.	DHD	Durham Downs Airport
Durrie	"YDRI" (PDF). AIP En Route Supplement from Airservices Australia. 3 September 2026.	DRR	Durrie Airport
Dysart	"YDYS" (PDF). AIP En Route Supplement from Airservices Australia. 3 September 2026.	DYA	Dysart Airport
Einasleigh	YEIN	EIH	Einasleigh Airport
Eloise Mine	"YESE" (PDF). AIP En Route Supplement from Airservices Australia. 3 September 2026.	ERQ	Elrose Mine Airport
Emerald	"YEML" (PDF). AIP En Route Supplement from Airservices Australia. 3 September 2026.	EMD	**Emerald Airport**
Fraser Island (Orchid Beach)	YORC	OKB	Orchid Beach Airport
Gamboola	YGAM	GBP	Gamboola Airport
Georgetown	"YGTN" (PDF). AIP En Route Supplement from Airservices Australia. 3 September 2026.	GTT	Georgetown Airport
Gladstone	"YGLA" (PDF). AIP En Route Supplement from Airservices Australia. 3 September 2026.	GLT	**Gladstone Airport**
Gayndah	"YGAY" (PDF). AIP En Route Supplement from Airservices Australia. 3 September 2026.	GAH	Gayndah Airport
Glengyle	YGLE	GLG	Glengyle Airport
Glenormiston	"YGLO" (PDF). AIP En Route Supplement from Airservices Australia. 3 September 2026.	GLM	Glenormiston Airport
**Gold Coast**/ Coolangatta	"YBCG" (PDF). AIP En Route Supplement from Airservices Australia. 3 September 2026.	OOL	**Gold Coast Airport**
Goondiwindi	"YGDI" (PDF). AIP En Route Supplement from Airservices Australia. 3 September 2026.	GOO	Goondiwindi Airport
Great Keppel Island	"YGKL" (PDF). AIP En Route Supplement from Airservices Australia. 3 September 2026.	GKL	Great Keppel Island Airport
Greenvale	YGNV	GVP	Greenvale Airport
Gregory	"YGDS" (PDF). AIP En Route Supplement from Airservices Australia. 3 September 2026.	GGD	Gregory Downs Airport
Gympie	"YGYM" (PDF). AIP En Route Supplement from Airservices Australia. 3 September 2026.	GYP	Gympie Airport
Hamilton Island	"YBHM" (PDF). AIP En Route Supplement from Airservices Australia. 3 September 2026.	HTI	**Great Barrier Reef Airport** (Hamilton Island Airport)
Headingly	YHDY	HIP	Headingly Airport
Heathlands	YHTL	HAT	Heathlands Airport
Helensvale		HLV	Helensvale Airport
Hervey Bay	"YHBA" (PDF). AIP En Route Supplement from Airservices Australia. 3 September 2026.	HVB	**Hervey Bay Airport**
Hopevale		HPE	Hopevale Airport
Horn Island	"YHID" (PDF). AIP En Route Supplement from Airservices Australia. 3 September 2026.	HID	**Horn Island Airport**
Hughenden	"YHUG" (PDF). AIP En Route Supplement from Airservices Australia. 3 September 2026.	HGD	**Hughenden Airport**
Iffley	"YIFY" (PDF). AIP En Route Supplement from Airservices Australia. 3 September 2026.	IFF	Iffley Airport
Ingham	"YIGM" (PDF). AIP En Route Supplement from Airservices Australia. 3 September 2026.	IGH	Ingham Airport
Injune	"YINJ" (PDF). AIP En Route Supplement from Airservices Australia. 3 September 2026.	INJ	Injune Airport
Inkerman	"YIKM" (PDF). AIP En Route Supplement from Airservices Australia. 3 September 2026.	IKP	Inkerman Airport
Innisfail	"YIFL" (PDF). AIP En Route Supplement from Airservices Australia. 3 September 2026.	IFL	Innisfail Airport
Isisford	"YISF" (PDF). AIP En Route Supplement from Airservices Australia. 3 September 2026.	ISI	Isisford Airport
Julia Creek	"YJLC" (PDF). AIP En Route Supplement from Airservices Australia. 3 September 2026.	JCK	**Julia Creek Airport**
Jundah	"YJDA" (PDF). AIP En Route Supplement from Airservices Australia. 3 September 2026.	JUN	Jundah Airport
Kalpowar	YKPR	KPP	Kalpowar Airport
Kamaran Downs		KDS	Kamaran Downs Airport
Kamileroi	"YKML" (PDF). AIP En Route Supplement from Airservices Australia. 3 September 2026.	KML	Kamileroi Airport
Karumba	"YKMB" (PDF). AIP En Route Supplement from Airservices Australia. 3 September 2026.	KRB	**Karumba Airport**
Kingaroy	"YKRY" (PDF). AIP En Route Supplement from Airservices Australia. 3 September 2026.	KGY	Kingaroy Airport
Koolatah	YKLA	KOH	Koolatah Airport
Koolburra	YKLB	KKP	Koolburra Airport
Kowanyama	"YKOW" (PDF). AIP En Route Supplement from Airservices Australia. 3 September 2026.	KWM	**Kowanyama Airport**
Kubin (Moa Island)	"YKUB" (PDF). AIP En Route Supplement from Airservices Australia. 3 September 2026.	KUG	**Kubin Airport**
Lady Elliot Island		LYT	Lady Elliot Island Airport
Lakefield	YLFD	LFP	Lakefield Airport (Rinyirru Airport)
Lakeland Downs	YLND	LKD	Lakeland Downs Airport
Laura	YLRA	LUU	Laura Airport
Lawn Hill	"YLAH" (PDF). AIP En Route Supplement from Airservices Australia. 3 September 2026.	LWH	Lawn Hill Airport
Linda Downs		LLP	Linda Downs Airport
Lindeman Island	YLIN	LDC	Lindeman Island Airport
Lizard Island	"YLZI" (PDF). AIP En Route Supplement from Airservices Australia. 3 September 2026.	LZR	**Lizard Island Airport**
Lockhart River	"YLHR" (PDF). AIP En Route Supplement from Airservices Australia. 3 September 2026.	IRG	**Lockhart River Airport**
Longreach	"YLRE" (PDF). AIP En Route Supplement from Airservices Australia. 3 September 2026.	LRE	**Longreach Airport**
Lorraine	"YLOR" (PDF). AIP En Route Supplement from Airservices Australia. 3 September 2026.	LOA	Lorraine Airport
Lotus Vale Station	YLOV	LTV	Lotus Vale Station Airport
Lyndhurst Station	YLHS	LTP	Lyndhurst Station Airport
Mabuiag Island	"YMAA" (PDF). AIP En Route Supplement from Airservices Australia. 3 September 2026.	UBB	**Mabuiag Island Airport**
Mackay	"YBMK" (PDF). AIP En Route Supplement from Airservices Australia. 3 September 2026.	MKY	**Mackay Airport**
Mareeba	"YMBA" (PDF). AIP En Route Supplement from Airservices Australia. 3 September 2026.	MRG	Mareeba Airfield
Marion Downs	YMWX	MXD	Marion Downs Airport
**Marcoola / Sunshine Coast**	"YBSU" (PDF). AIP En Route Supplement from Airservices Australia. 3 September 2026.	MCY	**Sunshine Coast Airport**
Maryborough	"YMYB" (PDF). AIP En Route Supplement from Airservices Australia. 3 September 2026.	MBH	Maryborough Airport
Merluna	YMEU	MLV	Merluna Airport
Middlemount	"YMMU" (PDF). AIP En Route Supplement from Airservices Australia. 3 September 2026.	MMM	Middlemount Airport
Miles	"YMLS" (PDF). AIP En Route Supplement from Airservices Australia. 3 September 2026.	WLE	Miles Airport
Miners Lake		MRL	Miners Lake Airport
Mitchell	"YMIT" (PDF). AIP En Route Supplement from Airservices Australia. 3 September 2026.	MTQ	Mitchell Airport
Monkira	"YMNK" (PDF). AIP En Route Supplement from Airservices Australia. 3 September 2026.	ONR	Monkira Airport
Monto	"YMTO" (PDF). AIP En Route Supplement from Airservices Australia. 3 September 2026.	MNQ	Monto Airport
Mooraberree	"YMOO" (PDF). AIP En Route Supplement from Airservices Australia. 3 September 2026.	OOR	Mooraberree Airport
Moranbah	"YMRB" (PDF). AIP En Route Supplement from Airservices Australia. 3 September 2026.	MOV	**Moranbah Airport**
Moreton / Wenlock	YMOT	MET	Moreton Airport
Morney	"YMNY" (PDF). AIP En Route Supplement from Airservices Australia. 3 September 2026.	OXY	Morney Airport
Mornington Island	"YMTI" (PDF). AIP En Route Supplement from Airservices Australia. 3 September 2026.	ONG	**Mornington Island Airport**
Mount Gordon Mine	"YGON" (PDF). AIP En Route Supplement from Airservices Australia. 3 September 2026.	GPD	Mount Gordon Airport
Mount Isa	"YBMA" (PDF). AIP En Route Supplement from Airservices Australia. 3 September 2026.	ISA	**Mount Isa Airport**
Murray Island	YMUI	MYI	**Murray Island Airport**
Musgrave	YMGV	MVU	Musgrave Airport
Muttaburra	"YMTB" (PDF). AIP En Route Supplement from Airservices Australia. 3 September 2026.	UTB	Muttaburra Airport
Nappa Merrie	"YNAP" (PDF). AIP En Route Supplement from Airservices Australia. 3 September 2026.	NMR	Nappa Merrie Airport
New Laura	YLRS	LUT	New Laura Airport
New Moon		NMP	New Moon Airport
Noosaville / Noosa	"YNSH" (PDF). AIP En Route Supplement from Airservices Australia. 3 September 2026.	NSV	Noosa Airport
Normanton	"YNTN" (PDF). AIP En Route Supplement from Airservices Australia. 3 September 2026.	NTN	**Normanton Airport**
Oban		OBA	Oban Airport
Orientos		OXO	Orientos Airport
Orpheus Island		ORS	Orpheus Island Resort Waterport
Osborne Mine	"YOSB" (PDF). AIP En Route Supplement from Airservices Australia. 3 September 2026.	OSO	Osborne Mine Airport
Palm Island	"YPAM" (PDF). AIP En Route Supplement from Airservices Australia. 3 September 2026.	PMK	**Palm Island Airport**
Phosphate Hill	"YTMO" (PDF). AIP En Route Supplement from Airservices Australia. 3 September 2026.	PHQ	The Monument Airport
Pormpuraaw / Edward River	"YPMP" (PDF). AIP En Route Supplement from Airservices Australia. 3 September 2026.	EDR	**Edward River Airport**
Proserpine	"YBPN" (PDF). AIP En Route Supplement from Airservices Australia. 3 September 2026.	PPP	**Whitsunday Coast Airport**
Quilpie	"YQLP" (PDF). AIP En Route Supplement from Airservices Australia. 3 September 2026.	ULP	**Quilpie Airport**
Redcliffe City (Rothwell)	"YRED" (PDF). AIP En Route Supplement from Airservices Australia. 3 September 2026.		Redcliffe Airport
Richmond	"YRMD" (PDF). AIP En Route Supplement from Airservices Australia. 3 September 2026.	RCM	**Richmond Airport**
Robinhood	"YROB" (PDF). AIP En Route Supplement from Airservices Australia. 3 September 2026.	ROH	Robinhood Airport
Rockhampton	"YBRK" (PDF). AIP En Route Supplement from Airservices Australia. 3 September 2026.	ROK	**Rockhampton Airport**
Rokeby		RKY	Rokeby Airport
Roma	"YROM" (PDF). AIP En Route Supplement from Airservices Australia. 3 September 2026.	RMA	**Roma Airport**
Roseberth		RSB	Roseberth Airport
Rosella Plains		RLP	Rosella Plains Airport
Rutland Plains	"YRTP" (PDF). AIP En Route Supplement from Airservices Australia. 3 September 2026.	RTP	Rutland Plains Airport
Saibai Island	"YSII" (PDF). AIP En Route Supplement from Airservices Australia. 3 September 2026.	SBR	**Saibai Island Airport**
Sandringham Station		SRM	Sandringham Station Airport
Silver Plains		SSP	Silver Plains Airport
South Galway	"YSGW" (PDF). AIP En Route Supplement from Airservices Australia. 3 September 2026.	ZGL	South Galway Airport
Southport	"YSPT" (PDF). AIP En Route Supplement from Airservices Australia. 3 September 2026.	SHQ	Southport Airport
Conjuboy, Queensland	"YSPK" (PDF). AIP En Route Supplement from Airservices Australia. 3 September 2026.	SCG	Spring Creek Airport
Springvale	YSPV	KSV	Springvale Airport
St George	"YSGE" (PDF). AIP En Route Supplement from Airservices Australia. 3 September 2026.	SGO	**St George Airport**
St Pauls		SVM	St Pauls Airport
Stanthorpe	"YSPE" (PDF). AIP En Route Supplement from Airservices Australia. 3 September 2026.	SNH	Stanthorpe Airport
Stephens Island		STF	Stephens Island Airport
Strathmore	YSMR	STH	Strathmore Airport
Sue Islet	"YWBS" (PDF). AIP En Route Supplement from Airservices Australia. 3 September 2026.	SYU	**Warraber Island Airport**
Tanbar		TXR	Tanbar Airport
Tangalooma	YTGA	TAN	Tangalooma Airport
Tara	"YTAA" (PDF). AIP En Route Supplement from Airservices Australia. 3 September 2026.	XTR	Tara Airport
Taroom	"YTAM" (PDF). AIP En Route Supplement from Airservices Australia. 3 September 2026.	XTO	Taroom Airport
Tewantin		TWN	Tewantin Airport
Thangool	"YTNG" (PDF). AIP En Route Supplement from Airservices Australia. 3 September 2026.	THG	**Thangool Airport**
Thargomindah	"YTGM" (PDF). AIP En Route Supplement from Airservices Australia. 3 September 2026.	XTG	**Thargomindah Airport**
Theodore	"YTDR" (PDF). AIP En Route Supplement from Airservices Australia. 3 September 2026.	TDR	Theodore Airport
Thylungra		TYG	Thylungra Airport
Toowoomba	"YTWB" (PDF). AIP En Route Supplement from Airservices Australia. 3 September 2026.	TWB	Toowoomba City Aerodrome
Toowoomba	"YBWW" (PDF). AIP En Route Supplement from Airservices Australia. 3 September 2026.	WTB	**Toowoomba Wellcamp Airport**
Torwood		TWP	Torwood Airport
**Townsville**	"YBTL" (PDF). AIP En Route Supplement from Airservices Australia. 3 September 2026.	TSV	**Townsville Airport** (RAAF Townsville)
Trepell	"YTEE" (PDF). AIP En Route Supplement from Airservices Australia. 3 September 2026.	TQP	Trepell Airport
Undara	"YUDA" (PDF). AIP En Route Supplement from Airservices Australia. 3 September 2026.	UDA	Undara Airport
Vanrook	"YVRS" (PDF). AIP En Route Supplement from Airservices Australia. 3 September 2026.	VNR	Vanrook Airport
Wandovale		MFL	Wandovale – Mount Full Stop Airport
Warwick	"YWCK" (PDF). AIP En Route Supplement from Airservices Australia. 3 September 2026.	WAZ	Warwick Airport
Waverney		WAN	Waverney Airport
Weipa	"YBWP" (PDF). AIP En Route Supplement from Airservices Australia. 3 September 2026.	WEI	**Weipa Airport**
Windorah	"YWDH" (PDF). AIP En Route Supplement from Airservices Australia. 3 September 2026.	WNR	**Windorah Airport**
Winton	"YWTN" (PDF). AIP En Route Supplement from Airservices Australia. 3 September 2026.	WIN	**Winton Airport**
Whitsunday, Shute Harbour	"YSHR" (PDF). AIP En Route Supplement from Airservices Australia. 3 September 2026.	WSY	Whitsunday – Shute Harbour Airport
Wondai	"YWND" (PDF). AIP En Route Supplement from Airservices Australia. 3 September 2026.	WDI	Wondai Airport
Wondoola	"YWDL" (PDF). AIP En Route Supplement from Airservices Australia. 3 September 2026.	WON	Wondoola Airport
Woodstock	"YDOP" (PDF). AIP En Route Supplement from Airservices Australia. 3 September 2026.		Donnington Airpark
Wrotham Park	"YWMP" (PDF). AIP En Route Supplement from Airservices Australia. 3 September 2026.	WPK	Wrotham Park Airport
Yam Island	"YYMI" (PDF). AIP En Route Supplement from Airservices Australia. 3 September 2026.	XMY	**Yam Island Airport**
Yorke Island	"YYKI" (PDF). AIP En Route Supplement from Airservices Australia. 3 September 2026.	OKR	**Yorke Island Airport**

=== South Australia ===
City served/location	ICAO	IATA	Airport name
**Adelaide**	"YPAD" (PDF). AIP En Route Supplement from Airservices Australia. 3 September 2026.	ADL	**Adelaide Airport**
Adelaide / Parafield	"YPPF" (PDF). AIP En Route Supplement from Airservices Australia. 3 September 2026.		Parafield Airport
Aldinga	YADG		Aldinga Airfield
Alton Downs	YADS	AWN	Alton Downs Airport
Amata	"YAMT" (PDF). AIP En Route Supplement from Airservices Australia. 3 September 2026.	AMT	Amata Airport
American River		RCN	American River Airport
Andamooka	YAMK	ADO	Andamooka Airport
Balcanoona	"YBLC" (PDF). AIP En Route Supplement from Airservices Australia. 3 September 2026.	LCN	Balcanoona Airport
Carrapateena mine	YCPT		Carrapateena Airport
Ceduna	"YCDU" (PDF). AIP En Route Supplement from Airservices Australia. 3 September 2026.	CED	**Ceduna Airport**
Cleve	"YCEE" (PDF). AIP En Route Supplement from Airservices Australia. 3 September 2026.	CVC	Cleve Airport
Clifton Hills	YCFH	CFH	Clifton Hills Landing Strip
Coober Pedy	"YCBP" (PDF). AIP En Route Supplement from Airservices Australia. 3 September 2026.	CPD	**Coober Pedy Airport**
Coorabie		CRJ	Coorabie Airport
Cordillo Downs	YCOD	ODL	Cordillo Downs Airport
Cowarie	YCWI	CWR	Cowarie Airport
Cowell	"YCWL" (PDF). AIP En Route Supplement from Airservices Australia. 3 September 2026.	CCW	Cowell Airport
Dulkaninna	YDLK	DLK	Dulkaninna Airport
Edinburgh	YPED		RAAF Base Edinburgh
Etadunna	YEDA	ETD	Etadunna Airstrip
Gawler	"YGAW" (PDF). AIP En Route Supplement from Airservices Australia. 3 September 2026.		Gawler Aerodrome
Goolwa	YGWA		Goolwa Airport
Hawker	"YHAW" (PDF). AIP En Route Supplement from Airservices Australia. 3 September 2026.	HWK	Hawker Airport
Indulkana	YIDK	IDK	Indulkana Airport
Innamincka	"YINN" (PDF). AIP En Route Supplement from Airservices Australia. 3 September 2026.	INM	Innamincka Airport
Kimba	"YIMB" (PDF). AIP En Route Supplement from Airservices Australia. 3 September 2026.		Kimba Airport
Kingscote, Kangaroo Island	"YKSC" (PDF). AIP En Route Supplement from Airservices Australia. 3 September 2026.	KGC	**Kingscote Airport**
Leigh Creek	"YLEC" (PDF). AIP En Route Supplement from Airservices Australia. 3 September 2026.	LGH	Leigh Creek Airport
Loxton	"YLOX" (PDF). AIP En Route Supplement from Airservices Australia. 3 September 2026.		Loxton Airport
Lock	YLOK	LOC	Lock Airport
Marla	"YALA" (PDF). AIP En Route Supplement from Airservices Australia. 3 September 2026.	MRP	Marla Airport
Marree	"YMRE" (PDF). AIP En Route Supplement from Airservices Australia. 3 September 2026.	RRE	Marree Airport
Merty Merty	YMYT	RTY	Merty Merty Airport
Millicent	"YMCT" (PDF). AIP En Route Supplement from Airservices Australia. 3 September 2026.	MLR	Millicent Airport
Minnipa	"YMPA" (PDF). AIP En Route Supplement from Airservices Australia. 3 September 2026.	MIN	Minnipa Airport
Minlaton	YMIN	XML	Minlaton Airport
Moolawatana	YMWT	MWT	Moolawatana Airport
Moomba	"YOOM" (PDF). AIP En Route Supplement from Airservices Australia. 3 September 2026.	MOO	Moomba Airport
Mount Gambier	"YMTG" (PDF). AIP En Route Supplement from Airservices Australia. 3 September 2026.	MGB	**Mount Gambier Airport**
Mount Gunson	YMGN	GSN	Mount Gunson Airport
Mulka	YMUK	MVK	Mulka Airport
Mungeranie	YMUG	MNE	Mungeranie Airport
Olympic Dam	"YOLD" (PDF). AIP En Route Supplement from Airservices Australia. 3 September 2026.	OLP	Olympic Dam Airport
Oodnadatta	"YOOD" (PDF). AIP En Route Supplement from Airservices Australia. 3 September 2026.	ODD	Oodnadatta Airport
Pandie Pandie	YPDI	PDE	Pandie Pandie Airport
Parndana		PDN	Parndana Airport
Penneshaw	YPSH	PEA	Penneshaw Airport
Penong		PEY	Penong Airport
Port Augusta	"YPAG" (PDF). AIP En Route Supplement from Airservices Australia. 3 September 2026.	PUG	Port Augusta Airport
Port Lincoln	"YPLC" (PDF). AIP En Route Supplement from Airservices Australia. 3 September 2026.	PLO	**Port Lincoln Airport**
Port Pirie	"YPIR" (PDF). AIP En Route Supplement from Airservices Australia. 3 September 2026.	PPI	Port Pirie Airport
Prominent Hill	"YPMH" (PDF). AIP En Route Supplement from Airservices Australia. 3 September 2026.	PXH	Prominent Hill Airport
Pukatja	"YERN" (PDF). AIP En Route Supplement from Airservices Australia. 3 September 2026.	ERB	Pukatja Airport
Renmark	"YREN" (PDF). AIP En Route Supplement from Airservices Australia. 3 September 2026.	RMK	Renmark Airport
Streaky Bay	"YKBY" (PDF). AIP En Route Supplement from Airservices Australia. 3 September 2026.	KBY	Streaky Bay Airport
Tarcoola		TAQ	Tarcoola Airport
Waikerie	"YWKI" (PDF). AIP En Route Supplement from Airservices Australia. 3 September 2026.		Waikerie Airport
Whyalla	"YWHA" (PDF). AIP En Route Supplement from Airservices Australia. 3 September 2026.	WYA	**Whyalla Airport**
Wudinna	"YWUD" (PDF). AIP En Route Supplement from Airservices Australia. 3 September 2026.	WUD	Wudinna Airport
Yalata Mission	YYTA	KYI	Yalata Mission Airport
Yorketown	YYOR	ORR	Yorketown Airport

=== Tasmania ===
City served/location	ICAO	IATA	Airport name
Cape Barren Island	YCBN	CBI	Cape Barren Island Airport
Devonport	"YDPO" (PDF). AIP En Route Supplement from Airservices Australia. 3 September 2026.	DPO	**Devonport Airport**
Flinders Island (Whitemark)	"YFLI" (PDF). AIP En Route Supplement from Airservices Australia. 3 September 2026.	FLS	**Flinders Island Airport**
George Town	"YGTO" (PDF). AIP En Route Supplement from Airservices Australia. 3 September 2026.	GEE	George Town Aerodrome
Queenstown	"YQNS" (PDF). AIP En Route Supplement from Airservices Australia. 3 September 2026.	UEE	Queenstown Airport
**Hobart**	"YMHB" (PDF). AIP En Route Supplement from Airservices Australia. 3 September 2026.	HBA	**Hobart Airport**
Hobart / Cambridge	"YCBG" (PDF). AIP En Route Supplement from Airservices Australia. 3 September 2026.		**Cambridge Aerodrome**
King Island (Currie)	"YKII" (PDF). AIP En Route Supplement from Airservices Australia. 3 September 2026.	KNS	**King Island Airport**
Launceston	"YMLT" (PDF). AIP En Route Supplement from Airservices Australia. 3 September 2026.	LST	**Launceston Airport**
St Helens	"YSTH" (PDF). AIP En Route Supplement from Airservices Australia. 3 September 2026.	HLS	St Helens Airport
Smithton	"YSMI" (PDF). AIP En Route Supplement from Airservices Australia. 3 September 2026.	SIO	Smithton Airport
Strahan	"YSRN" (PDF). AIP En Route Supplement from Airservices Australia. 3 September 2026.	SRN	Strahan Airport
Wynyard / Burnie	"YWYY" (PDF). AIP En Route Supplement from Airservices Australia. 3 September 2026.	BWT	**Burnie Airport**

=== Victoria ===
City served/location	ICAO	IATA	Airport name
Apollo Bay	YAPO		Apollo Bay Airport
Ararat	"YARA" (PDF). AIP En Route Supplement from Airservices Australia. 3 September 2026.	ARY	Ararat Airport
Geelong	"YMAV" (PDF). AIP En Route Supplement from Airservices Australia. 3 September 2026.	AVV	**Avalon Airport**
Bacchus Marsh	"YBSS" (PDF). AIP En Route Supplement from Airservices Australia. 3 September 2026.		Bacchus Marsh Airfield
Bairnsdale	"YBNS" (PDF). AIP En Route Supplement from Airservices Australia. 3 September 2026.	BSJ	Bairnsdale Airport
Ballarat	"YBLT" (PDF). AIP En Route Supplement from Airservices Australia. 3 September 2026.		Ballarat Airport
Barwon Heads	"YBRS" (PDF). AIP En Route Supplement from Airservices Australia. 3 September 2026.		Barwon Heads Airport
Benalla	"YBLA" (PDF). AIP En Route Supplement from Airservices Australia. 3 September 2026.	BLN	Benalla Airport
Bendigo	"YBDG" (PDF). AIP En Route Supplement from Airservices Australia. 3 September 2026.	BXG	**Bendigo Airport**
Bright		BRJ	Bright Airport
Colac	"YOLA" (PDF). AIP En Route Supplement from Airservices Australia. 3 September 2026.	XCO	Colac Airport
Corryong	"YCRG" (PDF). AIP En Route Supplement from Airservices Australia. 3 September 2026.	CYG	Corryong Airport
Echuca	"YECH" (PDF). AIP En Route Supplement from Airservices Australia. 3 September 2026.	ECH	Echuca Airport
Geelong	~~YGLG~~	~~GEX~~	Geelong Airport (closed)
Hamilton	"YHML" (PDF). AIP En Route Supplement from Airservices Australia. 3 September 2026.	HLT	Hamilton Airport
Hopetoun	"YHPN" (PDF). AIP En Route Supplement from Airservices Australia. 3 September 2026.	HTU	Hopetoun Airport
Horsham	"YHSM" (PDF). AIP En Route Supplement from Airservices Australia. 3 September 2026.	HSM	Horsham Airport
Kerang	"YKER" (PDF). AIP En Route Supplement from Airservices Australia. 3 September 2026.	KRA	Kerang Airport
Latrobe Valley / Morwell / Traralgon	"YLTV" (PDF). AIP En Route Supplement from Airservices Australia. 3 September 2026.	TGN	Latrobe Regional Airport
Leongatha	"YLEG" (PDF). AIP En Route Supplement from Airservices Australia. 3 September 2026.		Leongatha Airport
Mallacoota	"YMCO" (PDF). AIP En Route Supplement from Airservices Australia. 3 September 2026.	XMC	Mallacoota Airport
Mangalore	"YMNG" (PDF). AIP En Route Supplement from Airservices Australia. 3 September 2026.		Mangalore Airport
Maryborough	"YMBU" (PDF). AIP En Route Supplement from Airservices Australia. 3 September 2026.		Maryborough Airport
**Melbourne**	"YMML" (PDF). AIP En Route Supplement from Airservices Australia. 3 September 2026.	MEL	**Melbourne Airport**
Melbourne / Essendon Fields	"YMEN" (PDF). AIP En Route Supplement from Airservices Australia. 3 September 2026.	MEB	**Essendon Airport**
Melbourne / Moorabbin	"YMMB" (PDF). AIP En Route Supplement from Airservices Australia. 3 September 2026.	MBW	**Moorabbin Airport**
Mildura	"YMIA" (PDF). AIP En Route Supplement from Airservices Australia. 3 September 2026.	MQL	**Mildura Airport**
Mount Hotham	"YHOT" (PDF). AIP En Route Supplement from Airservices Australia. 3 September 2026.	MHU	Mount Hotham Airport
Nhill	"YNHL" (PDF). AIP En Route Supplement from Airservices Australia. 3 September 2026.		Nhill Airport
Orbost	"YORB" (PDF). AIP En Route Supplement from Airservices Australia. 3 September 2026.	RBS	Orbost Airport
Ouyen	YOUY	OYN	Ouyen Airport
Porepunkah / Mount Buffalo		MBF	Porepunkah – Mount Buffalo Airport
Portland	"YPOD" (PDF). AIP En Route Supplement from Airservices Australia. 3 September 2026.	PTJ	Portland Airport
Robinvale	"YROI" (PDF). AIP En Route Supplement from Airservices Australia. 3 September 2026.	RBC	Robinvale Airport
Sale	"YWSL" (PDF). AIP En Route Supplement from Airservices Australia. 3 September 2026.	SXE	West Sale Airport
Shepparton	"YSHT" (PDF). AIP En Route Supplement from Airservices Australia. 3 September 2026.	SHT	Shepparton Airport
Stawell	"YSWL" (PDF). AIP En Route Supplement from Airservices Australia. 3 September 2026.	SWC	Stawell Airport
Swan Hill	"YSWH" (PDF). AIP En Route Supplement from Airservices Australia. 3 September 2026.	SWH	Swan Hill Airport
Tooradin	"YTDN" (PDF). AIP En Route Supplement from Airservices Australia. 3 September 2026.		Tooradin Airfield
Tyabb	YTYA		Tyabb Airport
Wangaratta	"YWGT" (PDF). AIP En Route Supplement from Airservices Australia. 3 September 2026.	WGT	Wangaratta Airport
Warracknabeal	"YWKB" (PDF). AIP En Route Supplement from Airservices Australia. 3 September 2026.	WKB	Warracknabeal Airport
Warrnambool	"YWBL" (PDF). AIP En Route Supplement from Airservices Australia. 3 September 2026.	WMB	Warrnambool Airport
Welshpool		WHL	Welshpool Airport
Yarrawonga	"YYWG" (PDF). AIP En Route Supplement from Airservices Australia. 3 September 2026.		Yarrawonga Airport

=== Western Australia ===
City served/location	ICAO	IATA	Airport name
Albany	"YABA" (PDF). AIP En Route Supplement from Airservices Australia. 3 September 2026.	ALH	**Albany Airport**
Argyle	"YARG" (PDF). AIP En Route Supplement from Airservices Australia. 3 September 2026.	GYL	Argyle Airport
Balgo	"YBGO" (PDF). AIP En Route Supplement from Airservices Australia. 3 September 2026.	BQW	Balgo Hill Airport
Barimunya	"YBRY" (PDF). AIP En Route Supplement from Airservices Australia. 3 September 2026.	BYP	Barimunya Airport
Barrow Island	"YBWX" (PDF). AIP En Route Supplement from Airservices Australia. 3 September 2026.	BWB	Barrow Island Airport
Beagle Bay		BEE	Beagle Bay Airport
Bedford Downs	YBDF	BDW	Bedford Downs Airport
Beverley Springs	"YBYS" (PDF). AIP En Route Supplement from Airservices Australia. 3 September 2026.	BVZ	Beverley Springs Airport
Boolgeeda	"YBGD" (PDF). AIP En Route Supplement from Airservices Australia. 3 September 2026.	OCM	Boolgeeda Airport
**Broome**	"YBRM" (PDF). AIP En Route Supplement from Airservices Australia. 3 September 2026.	BME	**Broome International Airport**
Bunbury	"YBUN" (PDF). AIP En Route Supplement from Airservices Australia. 3 September 2026.	BUY	Bunbury Airport
Busselton	"YBLN" (PDF). AIP En Route Supplement from Airservices Australia. 3 September 2026.	BQB	**Busselton Margaret River Airport**
Caiguna	"YCAG" (PDF). AIP En Route Supplement from Airservices Australia. 3 September 2026.	CGV	Caiguna Airport
Carlton Hill		CRY	Carlton Hill Airport
Carosue Dam	YSCD	WCD	Carosue Dam Airport
Carnarvon	"YCAR" (PDF). AIP En Route Supplement from Airservices Australia. 3 September 2026.	CVQ	**Carnarvon Airport**
Cherrabun		CBC	Cherrabun Airport
Christmas Creek Mine	YCHK	CKW	Christmas Creek Mine Airport
Christmas Creek Station	YCRK	CXQ	Christmas Creek Station Airport
Collie	YCOI	CIE	Collie Airport
Coolawanyah Station	YCWY	COY	Coolawanyah Station Airport
Coondewanna	"YCWA" (PDF). AIP En Route Supplement from Airservices Australia. 3 September 2026.	CJF	Coondewanna Airport
Cue	"YCUE" (PDF). AIP En Route Supplement from Airservices Australia. 3 September 2026.	CUY	Cue Airport
Dalgaranga Gold Mine	YDGA	DGD	Dalgaranga Gold Mine Airport
Denham		DNM	Denham Airport
Derby	"YCIN" (PDF). AIP En Route Supplement from Airservices Australia. 3 September 2026.	DCN	Curtin Airport / RAAF Curtin
Derby	"YDBY" (PDF). AIP En Route Supplement from Airservices Australia. 3 September 2026.	DRB	Derby Airport
Dongara	YDRA	DOX	Dongara Airport
Doongan		DNG	Doongan Airport
Drysdale River Station	"YDRD" (PDF). AIP En Route Supplement from Airservices Australia. 3 September 2026.	DRY	Drysdale River Airport
Eneabba	YEEB	ENB	Eneabba Airport
Esperance	"YESP" (PDF). AIP En Route Supplement from Airservices Australia. 3 September 2026.	EPR	**Esperance Airport**
Eucla	YECL	EUC	Eucla Airport
Exmouth	"YPLM" (PDF). AIP En Route Supplement from Airservices Australia. 3 September 2026.	LEA	**Learmonth Airport**
Fitzroy Crossing	"YFTZ" (PDF). AIP En Route Supplement from Airservices Australia. 3 September 2026.	FIZ	**Fitzroy Crossing Airport**
Flora Valley	YFLO	FVL	Flora Valley Airport
Forrest	"YFRT" (PDF). AIP En Route Supplement from Airservices Australia. 3 September 2026.	FOS	Forrest Airport
Forrest River Mission / Oombulgurri		FVR	Forrest River Airport
Fossil Downs		FSL	Fossil Downs Airport
Cloudbreak mine	"YFDF" (PDF). AIP En Route Supplement from Airservices Australia. 3 September 2026.	KFE	Fortescue Dave Forrest Airport
Gascoyne Junction	YGSC	GSC	Gascoyne Junction Airport
Geraldton	"YGEL" (PDF). AIP En Route Supplement from Airservices Australia. 3 September 2026.	GET	**Geraldton Airport**
Gibb	"YGIB" (PDF). AIP En Route Supplement from Airservices Australia. 3 September 2026.	GBV	Gibb River Airport
Ginbata	"YGIA" (PDF). AIP En Route Supplement from Airservices Australia. 3 September 2026.	GBW	Ginbata Airport
Goldsworthy		GLY	Goldsworthy Airport
Gordon Downs	YGDN	GDD	Gordon Downs Airport
Halls Creek	"YHLC" (PDF). AIP En Route Supplement from Airservices Australia. 3 September 2026.	HCQ	**Halls Creek Airport**
Hillside	YHIL	HLL	Hillside Airport
Highbury	YHHY	HIG	Highbury Airport
Jandakot	"YPJT" (PDF). AIP En Route Supplement from Airservices Australia. 3 September 2026.	JAD	Jandakot Airport
Jurien Bay	"YJNB" (PDF). AIP En Route Supplement from Airservices Australia. 3 September 2026.	JUR	Jurien Bay Airport
Kalumburu	"YKAL" (PDF). AIP En Route Supplement from Airservices Australia. 3 September 2026.	UBU	Kalumburu Airport
Kalbarri	"YKBR" (PDF). AIP En Route Supplement from Airservices Australia. 3 September 2026.	KAX	Kalbarri Airport
Kalgoorlie	"YPKG" (PDF). AIP En Route Supplement from Airservices Australia. 3 September 2026.	KGI	**Kalgoorlie-Boulder Airport**
Kambalda	"YKBL" (PDF). AIP En Route Supplement from Airservices Australia. 3 September 2026.	KDB	Kambalda Airport
Karara	"YKAR" (PDF). AIP En Route Supplement from Airservices Australia. 3 September 2026.	KQR	Karara Airport
Karijini National Park	"YSOL" (PDF). AIP En Route Supplement from Airservices Australia. 3 September 2026.	SLJ	Solomon Airport
Karratha	"YPKA" (PDF). AIP En Route Supplement from Airservices Australia. 3 September 2026.	KTA	**Karratha Airport**
Katanning	"YKNG" (PDF). AIP En Route Supplement from Airservices Australia. 3 September 2026.	KNI	Katanning Airport
Kimberley Downs		KBD	Kimberley Downs Airport
Kununurra	"YPKU" (PDF). AIP En Route Supplement from Airservices Australia. 3 September 2026.	KNX	**East Kimberley Regional Airport**
Lake Gregory		LGE	Lake Gregory Airport
Lansdowne		LDW	Lansdowne Airport
Laverton	"YLTN" (PDF). AIP En Route Supplement from Airservices Australia. 3 September 2026.	LVO	Laverton Airport
Leinster	"YLST" (PDF). AIP En Route Supplement from Airservices Australia. 3 September 2026.	LER	Leinster Airport
Leonora	"YLEO" (PDF). AIP En Route Supplement from Airservices Australia. 3 September 2026.	LNO	Leonora Airport
Mandora Station	YMDI	MQA	Mandora Station Airport
Manjimup	"YMJM" (PDF). AIP En Route Supplement from Airservices Australia. 3 September 2026.	MJP	Manjimup Airport
Marble Bar	"YMBL" (PDF). AIP En Route Supplement from Airservices Australia. 3 September 2026.	MBB	Marble Bar Airport
Margaret River	"YMGT" (PDF). AIP En Route Supplement from Airservices Australia. 3 September 2026.	MQZ	Margaret River Airport
Margaret River Station	"YMGR" (PDF). AIP En Route Supplement from Airservices Australia. 3 September 2026.	MGV	Margaret River Station Airport
Meekatharra	"YMEK" (PDF). AIP En Route Supplement from Airservices Australia. 3 September 2026.	MKR	Meekatharra Airport
Merredin	"YMDN" (PDF). AIP En Route Supplement from Airservices Australia. 3 September 2026.		Merredin Airport
Mindibungu / Billiluna	YBIL	BIW	Billiluna Airport
Mitchell Plateau	YMIP	MIH	Mitchell Plateau Airport
Monkey Mia	"YSHK" (PDF). AIP En Route Supplement from Airservices Australia. 3 September 2026.	MJK	**Shark Bay Airport**
Morawa	"YMRW" (PDF). AIP En Route Supplement from Airservices Australia. 3 September 2026.	MWB	Morawa Airport
Mount Barnett		MBN	Mount Barnett Airport
Mount House	"YMHO" (PDF). AIP En Route Supplement from Airservices Australia. 3 September 2026.	MHO	Mount House Airport
Mount Keith Mine	"YMNE" (PDF). AIP En Route Supplement from Airservices Australia. 3 September 2026.	WME	Mount Keith Airport
Mount Magnet	"YMOG" (PDF). AIP En Route Supplement from Airservices Australia. 3 September 2026.	MMG	Mount Magnet Airport
Mullewa	"YMWA" (PDF). AIP En Route Supplement from Airservices Australia. 3 September 2026.	MXU	Mullewa Airport
Mungalalu	"YTST" (PDF). AIP En Route Supplement from Airservices Australia. 3 September 2026.	TTX	Mungalalu – Truscott Airport
Murrin Murrin	"YMMI" (PDF). AIP En Route Supplement from Airservices Australia. 3 September 2026.	WUI	Murrin Murrin Airport
Myroodah Station	YMYR	MYO	Myroodah Station Airport
Narrogin	"YNRG" (PDF). AIP En Route Supplement from Airservices Australia. 3 September 2026.	NRG	Narrogin Airport
Newman	"YNWN" (PDF). AIP En Route Supplement from Airservices Australia. 3 September 2026.	ZNE	**Newman Airport**
Nicholson		NLS	Nicholson Airport
Nifty Copper Mine	"YCNF" (PDF). AIP En Route Supplement from Airservices Australia. 3 September 2026.	NIF	Nifty Airport
Noonkanbah		NKB	Noonkanbah Airport
Norseman	"YNSM" (PDF). AIP En Route Supplement from Airservices Australia. 3 September 2026.	NSM	Norseman Airport
Nullagine	"YNUL" (PDF). AIP En Route Supplement from Airservices Australia. 3 September 2026.	NLL	Nullagine Airport
Onslow	"YOLW" (PDF). AIP En Route Supplement from Airservices Australia. 3 September 2026.	ONS	**Onslow Airport**
Ord River	YORV	ODR	Ord River Airport
Paraburdoo	"YPBO" (PDF). AIP En Route Supplement from Airservices Australia. 3 September 2026.	PBO	**Paraburdoo Airport**
Pardoo Station	YPDO	PRD	Pardoo Station Airport
**Perth**	"YPPH" (PDF). AIP En Route Supplement from Airservices Australia. 3 September 2026.	PER	**Perth Airport**
**Port Hedland**	"YPPD" (PDF). AIP En Route Supplement from Airservices Australia. 3 September 2026.	PHE	**Port Hedland International Airport**
Purnululu National Park	"YBEB" (PDF). AIP En Route Supplement from Airservices Australia. 3 September 2026.	BXF	Bellburn Airport
Ravensthorpe	"YNRV" (PDF). AIP En Route Supplement from Airservices Australia. 3 September 2026.	RVT	Ravensthorpe Airport
Roebourne	YROE	RBU	Roebourne Airport
Rottnest Island	"YRTI" (PDF). AIP En Route Supplement from Airservices Australia. 3 September 2026.	RTS	**Rottnest Island Airport**
Roy Hill Station	YRYH	RHL	Roy Hill Station Airport
Sandstone	YSAN	NDS	Sandstone Airport
Shay Gap	"YSHG" (PDF). AIP En Route Supplement from Airservices Australia. 3 September 2026.	SGP	Shay Gap Airport
Southern Cross	"YSCR" (PDF). AIP En Route Supplement from Airservices Australia. 3 September 2026.	SQC	Southern Cross Airport
Shaw River		SWB	Shaw River Airport
Springvale		ZVG	Springvale Airport
Sturt Creek		SSK	Sturt Creek Airport
Sunrise Dam Gold Mine	"YSRD" (PDF). AIP En Route Supplement from Airservices Australia. 3 September 2026.		Sunrise Dam Airport
Tableland Homestead	YTAB	TBL	Tableland Homestead Airport
Telfer	"YTEF" (PDF). AIP En Route Supplement from Airservices Australia. 3 September 2026.	TEF	Telfer Airport
Theda Station	YTHD	TDN	Theda Station Airport
Tom Price	YTMP	TPR	Tom Price Airport
Useless Loop	YUSL	USL	Useless Loop Airport
Wallal Downs	YWAL	WLA	Wallal Downs Airport
Warmun (Turkey Creek)	YTKY	TKY	Turkey Creek Airport
Warrawagine Station	YWWG	WRW	Warrawagine Station Airport
West Angelas	"YANG" (PDF). AIP En Route Supplement from Airservices Australia. 3 September 2026.	WLP	West Angelas Airport
Wiluna	"YWLU" (PDF). AIP En Route Supplement from Airservices Australia. 3 September 2026.	WUN	Wiluna Airport
Wittenoom	YWIT	WIT	Wittenoom Gorge Airport
Windarra		WND	Windarra Airport
Woodie Woodie	"YWWI" (PDF). AIP En Route Supplement from Airservices Australia. 3 September 2026.	WWI	Woodie Woodie Airport
Wyndham	"YWYM" (PDF). AIP En Route Supplement from Airservices Australia. 3 September 2026.	WYN	Wyndham Airport
Yalgoo	YYAL	YLG	Yalgoo Airport
Yandicoogina / Barimunya	YBRY	YNN	Yandicoogina Airport / Barimunya Airport
Yeelirrie	YYLR	KYF	Yeelirrie Airport

=== Other territories ===
City served/location	ICAO	IATA	Airport name
Christmas Island	"YPXM" (PDF). AIP En Route Supplement from Airservices Australia. 3 September 2026.	XCH	**Christmas Island Airport**
Cocos (Keeling) Islands	"YPCC" (PDF). AIP En Route Supplement from Airservices Australia. 3 September 2026.	CCK	**Cocos (Keeling) Islands Airport**
Jervis Bay Territory	"YJBY" (PDF). AIP En Route Supplement from Airservices Australia. 3 September 2026.		Jervis Bay Airport
**Norfolk Island**	"YSNF" (PDF). AIP En Route Supplement from Airservices Australia. 3 September 2026.	NLK	**Norfolk Island Airport**
Australian Antarctic Territory	YWKS		**Wilkins Runway** (private)

=== Military: Air Force ===
City served/location	ICAO	IATA	Airport name
Bullsbrook, Western Australia	"YPEA" (PDF). AIP En Route Supplement from Airservices Australia. 3 September 2026.		RAAF Pearce
Darwin, Northern Territory	"YPDN" (PDF). AIP En Route Supplement from Airservices Australia. 3 September 2026.	DRW	RAAF Darwin (joint use)
Derby, Western Australia	"YCIN" (PDF). AIP En Route Supplement from Airservices Australia. 3 September 2026.	DCN	RAAF Curtin (joint use)
Exmouth, Western Australia	"YPLM" (PDF). AIP En Route Supplement from Airservices Australia. 3 September 2026.	LEA	RAAF Learmonth (joint use)
Gingin, Western Australia	"YGIG" (PDF). AIP En Route Supplement from Airservices Australia. 3 September 2026.		RAAF Gingin
Glenbrook, New South Wales	"YGNB" (PDF). AIP En Route Supplement from Airservices Australia. 3 September 2026.		RAAF Glenbrook (helipads only)
Ipswich, Queensland	"YAMB" (PDF). AIP En Route Supplement from Airservices Australia. 3 September 2026.		RAAF Amberley
Katherine, Northern Territory	"YPTN" (PDF). AIP En Route Supplement from Airservices Australia. 3 September 2026.	KTR	RAAF Tindal
Newcastle, New South Wales	"YWLM" (PDF). AIP En Route Supplement from Airservices Australia. 3 September 2026.	NTL	RAAF Williamtown (joint use)
Point Cook, Victoria	"YMPC" (PDF). AIP En Route Supplement from Airservices Australia. 3 September 2026.		RAAF Williams
Richmond, Sydney, New South Wales	"YSRI" (PDF). AIP En Route Supplement from Airservices Australia. 3 September 2026.	XRH	RAAF Richmond
Sale, Victoria	"YMES" (PDF). AIP En Route Supplement from Airservices Australia. 3 September 2026.	SXE	RAAF East Sale
Salisbury, South Australia	"YPED" (PDF). AIP En Route Supplement from Airservices Australia. 3 September 2026.		RAAF Edinburgh
Townsville, Queensland	"YBTL" (PDF). AIP En Route Supplement from Airservices Australia. 3 September 2026.	TSV	RAAF Townsville (joint use)
Weipa, Queensland	"YBSG" (PDF). AIP En Route Supplement from Airservices Australia. 3 September 2026.		RAAF Scherger
Woomera, South Australia	"YPWR" (PDF). AIP En Route Supplement from Airservices Australia. 3 September 2026.	UMR	RAAF Woomera

=== Military: Army Aviation ===
City served/location	ICAO	IATA	Airport name
Enoggera, Queensland	"YENO" (PDF). AIP En Route Supplement from Airservices Australia. 3 September 2026.		Gallipoli Barracks (formerly Enoggera Barracks)
Holsworthy, New South Wales	"YSHW" (PDF). AIP En Route Supplement from Airservices Australia. 3 September 2026.		Holsworthy Barracks
Oakey, Queensland	"YBOK" (PDF). AIP En Route Supplement from Airservices Australia. 3 September 2026.	OKY	Oakey Army Aviation Centre (Oakey Airport)
Holtze, Northern Territory			Robertson Barracks
Rockhampton, Queensland	"YWIS" (PDF). AIP En Route Supplement from Airservices Australia. 3 September 2026.		Williamson Airfield
Singleton, New South Wales	"YDOC" (PDF). AIP En Route Supplement from Airservices Australia. 3 September 2026.		Dochra Airfield
Townsville, Queensland	YLVK		Lavarack Barracks

=== Military: Naval Aviation ===
City served/location	ICAO	IATA	Airport name
Garden Island, Western Australia	"YGAD" (PDF). AIP En Route Supplement from Airservices Australia. 3 September 2026.		HMAS Stirling
Jervis Bay, Jervis Bay Territory	"YJBY" (PDF). AIP En Route Supplement from Airservices Australia. 3 September 2026.		Jervis Bay Airport
Nowra, New South Wales	"YSNW" (PDF). AIP En Route Supplement from Airservices Australia. 3 September 2026.	NOA	HMAS Albatross

== See also ==
- List of the busiest airports in Australia
- List of the busiest air routes in Australia by passenger traffic
- List of ports in Australia
- Australian air traffic control
- Transport in Australia
- Highways in Australia
- List of airports by ICAO code: Y
- Wikipedia:WikiProject Aviation/Airline destination lists: Oceania#Australia

== Other sources ==
- "ICAO Location Indicators by State" (PDF). International Civil Aviation Organization. 17 September 2010. Archived from the original (PDF) on 15 January 2016.
- "UN Location Codes: Australia". UN/LOCODE 2011-2. UNECE. 28 February 2012. – includes IATA codes
- AirportGuide: Australia – used to check ICAO and IATA airport codes
- Great Circle Mapper: Australia – used to check IATA airport codes
