= HXX =

HXX can refer to:

- Hay Airport, New South Wales, Australia (IATA code)
- Heathrow Terminals 2 & 3 railway station, London, United Kingdom (National Rail code)
- Huxiaoxing station, Zhejiang, China (Station code)
