= CZY =

CZY may refer to:

- Cluny Airport, an airport in Cluny, Queensland, Australia, by IATA code; see List of airports in Australia#Queensland
- Chaozhou, a city in Guangdong province, China
- Muyocopronaceae, a family of fungi from the Dothideomycetes class, by Catalogue of Life identifier
