= FRB =

FRB may refer to:

- Fast radio burst in radio astronomy
- Fractional-reserve banking
- Fairbourne railway station, in Wales, station code
- Federal Reserve Board of Governors, in the United States
  - Federal Reserve Bank
- Forbes Airport, New South Wales, Australia, IATA code
- Team Frøy–Bianchi, a Norwegian cycling team, code
- FKBP12-Rapamycin Binding domain; see Mechanistic target of rapamycin
