= BWQ =

BWQ or bwq may refer to:

- BWQ, the IATA code for Brewarrina Airport, New South Wales, Australia
- BWQ, the station code for Bhalwal railway station, Pakistan
- BWQ, the acronym for buzzword quotient
- bwq, the ISO 639-3 code for the Bobo language in southern Burkina Faso, Mali
