= Forster (Wallis Island) Airport =

- IATA: none; ICAO: none

Summary
- Airport type: Private
- Location: Wallis Island, New South Wales, Australia
- Time zone: AEST (+10:00)
  - Summer (DST): ADST (+11:00)
- Elevation AMSL: 1 m / 4 ft
- Coordinates: 32°12′15″S 152°28′44″E
- Website: Official website
- Interactive map of Forster (Wallis Island) Airport

Runways
Direction	Length		Surface
Direction	m	ft	Surface
05/23	1,500	4,921	Gravel/Grass

Forster (Wallis Island) Airport is a private Australian airfield located on Wallis Island, in the Mid North Coast region of New South Wales. The island, which sits within Wallis Lake is not connected by road to any of the surrounding communities and is only accessible by boat or the airport itself. There are currently no commercial or scheduled flights servicing it. The airport's single runway is 1,500 meters (4,900 ft) long with a mixed grass/gravel surface.

== History ==
Amid a tourism boom in the post-war years, the Forster Chamber of Commerce leased a parcel of crown land on the island with the intent of developing an airfield. Construction began in September 1949, paid for by community donations and using volunteer labour. The Chamber was successful in attracting Butler Air Transport to commence a regular air service to Sydney using Douglas DC-3s from 1950, which it considered necessary not just to bring in tourists, but to provide faster access for residents of Forster and nearby Tuncurry to medical services. From its opening, the airfield was connected to town via a ferry service.

Butler Air Transport continued to serve Forster via the Wallis Island airport until 1959, when the service was taken over by its successor Airlines of New South Wales. Some services continued north to Kempsey and Coffs Harbour during this era. In January 1965, the airline was only serving Wallis Island three times per week, with all services withdrawn sometime before 1967. From 1968, Forster was listed as a destination by East-West Airlines, however these services were actually operated from nearby Taree Airport rather than Wallis Island, with passengers connecting by road coach. Between the 1960s and 80s, a number of smaller carriers served the airport, mainly with commuter aircraft such as the Embraer 110 of Air Great Lakes, who began twice-daily flights to Sydney in 1980. Ferry services were provided to meet each flight at a cost of $1.50 each way. Tamair commenced twice-daily flights to Sydney using a Piper PA-31 Navajo based at the airport in 1994, however this was discontinued after only six months, with the ongoing need for each flight to be met by a ferry service considered unviable.

Much of Wallis Island, including the airport, was sold on 27 February 2018. The airfield remains under private ownership, with the new operators marketing it as a recreational destination for private pilots, hosting occasional fly-in events.

== See also ==
- List of airports in Australia
- List of airports in New South Wales
