= Wellington Airport (disambiguation) =

Wellington Airport may refer to:

- Wellington Airport in Wellington, New Zealand (IATA: WLG)
- Wellington Municipal Airport in Wellington, Kansas, United States (FAA: EGT)

Other airports in places named Wellington:

- Reader-Botsford Airport in Wellington, Ohio, United States (FAA: 67D)
- Marian Airpark in Wellington, Texas, United States (FAA: F06)
- Wellington/Bodangora Airport in Wellington, New South Wales, Australia (ICAO code YWEL)
