= Cootamundra Airport =

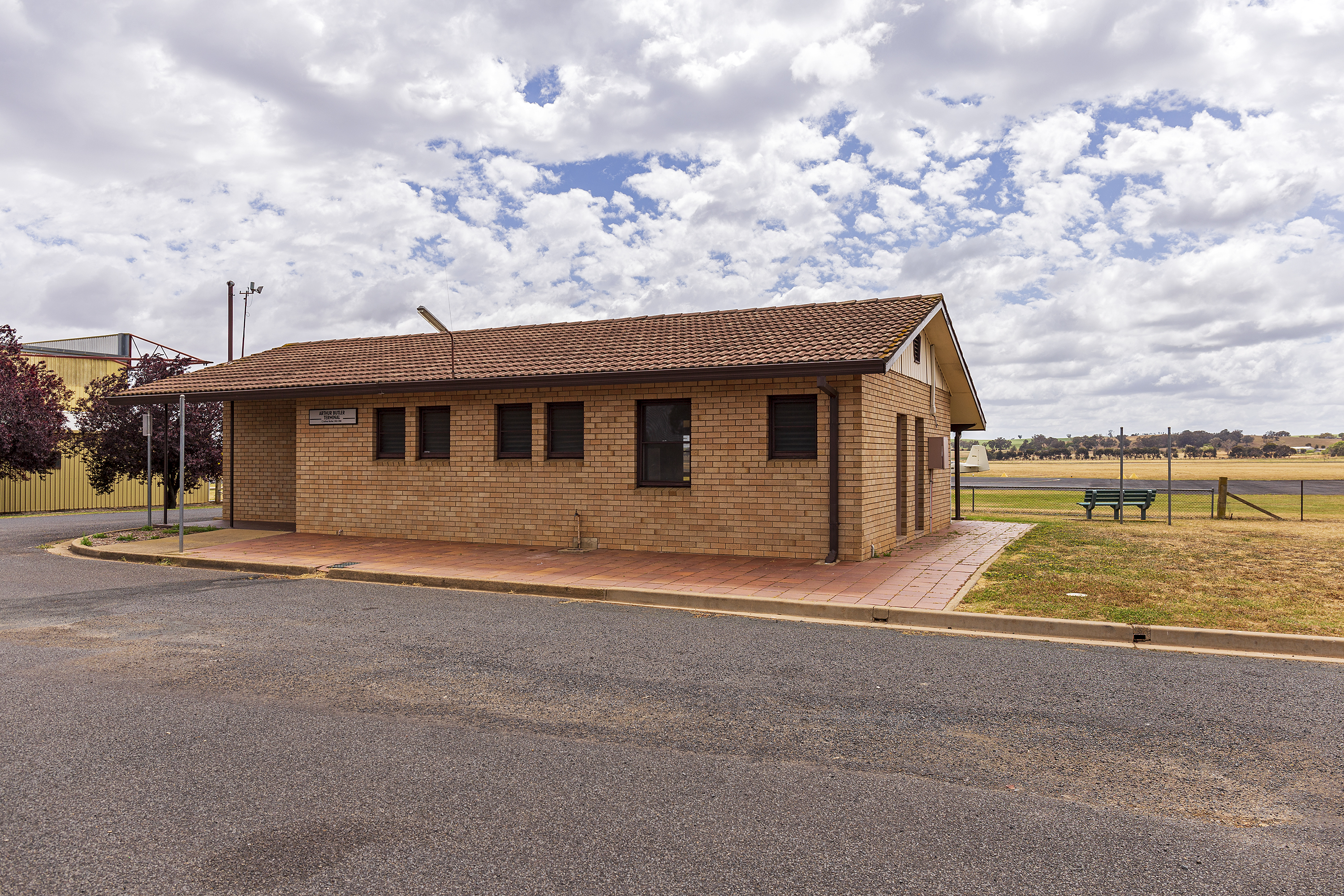
- Arthur Butler Terminal
- IATA: CMD; ICAO: YCTM

Summary
- Airport type: Public
- Operator: Cootamundra-Gundagai Regional Council
- Location: Cootamundra, New South Wales
- Elevation AMSL: 1,110 ft / 338 m
- Coordinates: 34°37′30″S 148°02′06″E

Map
- Location in New South Wales

Runways
Direction	Length		Surface
Direction	m	ft	Surface
16/34	1,406	4,613	Asphalt
10/28	855	2,805	Grass
- Sources: AIP

Cootamundra Airport (IATA: CMD, ICAO: YCTM) is a small airport in Cootamundra, New South Wales, Australia. The airport is also the venue for the annual GTR Challenge and Drag Battle motorsport event.

== History ==
With the implementation of an airmail service between Australia and Britain, owing to its location on the Main Southern railway line midway between Sydney and Melbourne and proximity to Canberra, Cootamundra was chosen as the southern terminus. The airfield became the initial base for Butler Air Transport, established as an airmail contractor in 1934 to operate a section of the route between Cootamundra and Charleville, providing connection to Qantas services between Brisbane and Darwin. The company relocated its base to Sydney in 1938 following the withdrawal of the airmail contract.

From 1991 to 2002 Country Connection Airlines offered regional flights from Cootamundra to Sydney, as well as to many other regional locations such as West Wyalong, Cowra, Forbes and Young.

=== RAAF Station Cootamundra ===
Cootamundra was chosen as a station for No. 1 Air Observers School and No. 2 Recruit Depot during World War II. Numbers 60 and 73 Squadrons also operated from the base. Following the cessation of hostilities the airfield reverted to civilian use.

== Accidents and incidents ==
- On 25 June 2001, an Embraer EMB 110 Bandeirante operated by Airtex Aviation on a charter flight from Sydney to Griffith suffered an engine fire en route. Believing the fire to be extinguished after taking initial action, the pilot elected to land at Young Airport. On finding Young under fog, the pilot diverted to Cootamundra. Between the towns, the aircraft cabin filled with smoke from the fire which had flared up again in the engine nacelle. During the emergency landing, only the aircraft's right main landing gear extended and the aircraft skidded to a stop on grass next to the runway. The pilot and all 8 passengers evacuated safely, however the investigation revealed delays in the emergency response to the accident, including an Ambulance that was initially unable to access the airfield as the emergency gate was locked.

== See also ==
- List of airports in New South Wales
