= Nambucca Heads Airport =

Airport in Australia

- IATA: NBH; ICAO: YNAA

Summary
- Airport type: Public
- Serves: Nambucca Heads, New South Wales
- Elevation AMSL: 6 ft / 2 m
- Coordinates: 30°40′33.6″S 152°58′57.0″E

Map
- Location in New South Wales

Runways
Direction	Length		Surface
Direction	m	ft	Surface
02/20	821	2,694	Grass
- Sources: AIP

Nambucca Heads Airport (IATA: NBH, ICAO: YNAA) is an airport located in Nambucca Heads, New South Wales, Australia.

== See also ==
- List of airports in New South Wales
