= Gunnedah Airport =

- IATA: GUH; ICAO: YGDH

Summary
- Airport type: Public
- Operator: Gunnedah Shire Council
- Location: Gunnedah, New South Wales, Australia
- Elevation AMSL: 863 ft / 263 m
- Coordinates: 30°57′42″S 150°15′00″E

Map
- Location in New South Wales

Runways
| Direction | Length | | Surface |
| Direction | m | ft | Surface |
|---|---|---|---|
| 11/29 | 1,645 | 5,397 | Asphalt |
| 17/35 | 592 | 1,942 | Grass |
- Source: AIP ERSA

Gunnedah Airport (IATA: GUH, ICAO: YGDH) is a small airport located 1 nautical mile (1.9 km; 1.2 mi) north of Gunnedah, New South Wales, Australia.

== History ==
An aerodrome was first proposed in 1946 and Liverpool Plains Shire Council agreed to construction by public subscription in 1949. It was officially opened on 12 May 1951.

== See also ==
- List of airports in New South Wales
