= Walcha Airport =

- IATA: WLC; ICAO: YWCH

Summary
- Airport type: Public
- Serves: Walcha, New South Wales
- Elevation AMSL: 3,786 ft / 1,154 m
- Coordinates: 31°0′23.8″S 151°33′11.2″E

Map
- Location in New South Wales

Runways
| Direction | Length | | Surface |
| Direction | m | ft | Surface |
|---|---|---|---|
| 06/24 | 1,593 | 5,226 | Gravel |
| 13/31 | 869 | 2,851 | Grass |
- Sources: AIP

Walcha Airport (IATA: WLC, ICAO: YWCH) is an airport located in Walcha, New South Wales, Australia.

== See also ==
- List of airports in New South Wales
