= Rylstone Airpark =

Aerodrome in New South Wales

Coordinates: 32°46′15″S 149°59′36″E

Rylstone Aerodrome is a residential airpark in Rylstone, New South Wales, for ultralight aviation, gyrocopters, and paragliding enthusiasts. The Rylstone Airstrip is used for this activity.

Permission was given in 2007 to develop Rylstone Aerodrome as an air park, with hangars and maintenance facilities. The airstrip was sold by the Mid Western Regional Council to a private individual who intends to keep the strip for aviation purposes. The airports was indeed developed as an residential airpark with the first homes sold in 2015.

== See also ==
- Aviation in Australia
- List of airports in Australia
- List of airports in New South Wales
- Aerodrome
- Satellite airfield
- Naval outlying landing field
- STOLport
