= Woy Woy Aerodrome =

Woy Woy Aerodrome
- IATA: none; ICAO: none

Summary
- Airport type: Dispersal & landing ground
- Location: Woy Woy, New South Wales, Australia
- Built: 1942
- Occupants: Royal Australian Air Force & Royal Navy Fleet Air Arm
- Coordinates: 33°30′15″S 151°19′10″E

Map
- Location in New South Wales

Runways
Direction	Length		Surface
Direction	m	ft	Surface
			Gravel

Woy Woy Aerodrome was an aerodrome constructed in 1942 as a dispersal ground and landing ground for the Fleet Air Arm of the Royal Navy at Woy Woy, New South Wales. The airfield was built as a satellite of RAAF Station Schofields.

The airfield ran north to south next to what is Trafalgar Avenue, Woy Woy and was constructed from compacted red gravel used as the runway surface. The red gravel can still be seen along the edge of the road surface.

The hangars and service area were located in what is now Alma Avenue, Woy Woy. The hangars are still in existence and are utilised as warehouses or industrial buildings.

The airfield was last used in 1946, the land subsequently developed for residential occupation.

An anti-aircraft battery protected the airfield which was located in Blackwall Mountain Reserve.

== See also ==
- List of airports in New South Wales
