= List of airports in New South Wales =

This is an incomplete list of airports in the Australian state of New South Wales.

== List of airports ==
The list is sorted by the name of the community served, click the sort buttons in the table header to switch listing order. Cities in bold are international airports.

Community	Airport name	Type	ICAO	IATA	Coordinates
Albury	Albury Airport	Public	YMAY	ABX	36°04′06″S 146°57′30″E
Armidale	Armidale Airport	Public	YARM	ARM	30°31′42″S 151°37′00″E
Badgerys Creek, Sydney	Western Sydney Airport	Public	YSWS	WSI	33°52′46″S 150°44′23″E
Ballina	Ballina Byron Gateway Airport	Public	YBNA	BNK	28°50′00″S 153°33′42″E
Balranald	Balranald Airport	Public	YBRN	BZD	34°37′24″S 143°34′42″E
Bankstown, Sydney	Bankstown Airport	Public	YSBK	BWU	33°55′30″S 150°59′18″E
Bathurst	Bathurst Airport	Public	YBTH	BHS	33°24′36″S 149°39′06″E
Bourke	Bourke Airport	Public	YBKE	BRK	30°02′18″S 145°57′06″E
Brewarrina	Brewarrina Airport	Public	YBRW	BWQ	29°58′24″S 146°49′00″E
Broken Hill	Broken Hill Airport	Public	YBHI	BHQ	32°00′06″S 141°28′18″E
Camden, Sydney	Camden Airport	Public	YSCN	CDU	34°02′24″S 150°41′12″E
Cessnock	Cessnock Airport	Public	YCNK	CES	32°47′18″S 151°20′30″E
Cobar	Cobar Airport	Public	YCBA	CAZ	31°32′18″S 145°47′36″E
Coffs Harbour	Coffs Harbour Airport	Public	YCFS	CFS	30°19′12″S 153°07′00″E
Collarenebri	Collarenebri Airport	Public	YCBR	CRB	29°31′18″S 148°34′54″E
Condobolin	Condobolin Airport	Public	YCDO	CBX	33°03′54″S 147°12′30″E
Coolah	Coolah Airport	Public	YCAH	CLH	31°46′24″S 149°36′36″E
Cooma	Cooma–Polo Flat Airport	Public	YPFT		36°13′48″S 149°09′00″E
Cooma	Cooma–Snowy Mountains Airport	Public	YCOM	OOM	36°18′00″S 148°58′24″E
Coonabarabran	Coonabarabran Airport	Public	YCBB	COJ	31°20′S 149°16′E
Coonamble	Coonamble Airport	Public	YCNM	CNB	30°59′00″S 148°22′30″E
Cootamundra	Cootamundra Airport	Public	YCTM	CMD	34°37′30″S 148°02′06″E
Corowa	Corowa Airport	Public	YCOR	CWW	35°59′24″S 146°21′06″E
Cowra	Cowra Airport	Public	YCWR	CWT	33°50′42″S 148°38′54″E
Deniliquin	Deniliquin Airport	Public	YDLQ	DNQ	35°33′36″S 144°56′48″E
Dubbo	Dubbo Regional Airport	Public	YSDU	DBO	32°13′00″S 148°34′30″E
Evans Head	Evans Head Memorial Aerodrome	Public	YEVD	EVH	29°05′36″S 153°25′12″E
Forbes	Forbes Airport	Public	YFBS	FRB	33°21′48″S 147°56′06″E
Glen Innes	Glen Innes Airport	Public	YGLI	GLI	29°40′30″S 151°41′24″E
Glenbrook	RAAF Base Glenbrook	Military	YGNB		33°45′48″S 150°38′12″E
Goodooga	Goodooga Airport	Public	YGDA		29°04′24″S 147°22′24″E
Goulburn	Goulburn Airport	Public	YGLB	GUL	34°48′06″S 149°43′06″E
Grafton	Clarence Valley Regional Airport	Public	YGFN	GFN	29°45′36″S 153°01′48″E
Griffith	Griffith Airport	Public	YGTH	GFF	34°15′06″S 146°04′00″E
Gundaroo	Gundaroo Airport	Private	YGDO		35°02′43″S 149°15′26″E
Gunnedah	Gunnedah Airport	Public	YGDH	GUH	30°57′42″S 150°15′00″E
Hay	Hay Airport	Public	YHAY	HXX	34°31′53″S 144°49′47″E
Holsworthy, Sydney	Holsworthy Barracks	Military	YSHW		33°59′42″S 150°57′06″E
Inverell	Inverell Airport	Public	YIVL	IVR	29°53′18″S 151°08′39″E
Albion Park, Illawarra|Wollongong	Shellharbour Airport	Public	YSHL	WOL	31°04′28″S 151°46′11″E
Kempsey	Kempsey Airport	Private	YKMP	KPS	31°04′28″S 152°46′11″E
Lake Cargelligo	Lake Cargelligo Airport	Private	YLCG		33°16′42″S 146°22′12″E
Lightning Ridge	Lightning Ridge Airport	Public	YLRD	LHG	29°27′24″S 147°59′06″E
Lismore	Lismore Airport	Public	YLIS	LSY	28°49′41″S 153°15′36″E
Lord Howe Island	**Lord Howe Island Airport**	Public	YLHI	LDH	31°32′18″S 159°04′38″E
Luskintyre	Luskintyre Airfield	Private	YLSK		32°40′S 151°25′E
Maitland	Maitland Airport	Public	YMND	MTL	32°42′12″S 151°29′18″E
**Mascot, Sydney**	**Sydney Airport**	Public	YSSY	SYD	33°56′46″S 151°10′38″E
Merimbula	Merimbula Airport	Public	YMER	MIM	36°54′31″S 149°54′05″E
Moree	Moree Airport	Public	YMOR	MRZ	29°29′56″S 149°50′41″E
Moruya	Moruya Airport	Public	YMRY	MYA	35°53′52″S 150°08′40″E
Mudgee	Mudgee Airport	Public	YMDG	DGE	32°33′45″S 149°36′40″E
Mungindi	Mungindi Airport	Public	YMGI		28°58′00″S 149°03′00″E
Narrabri	Narrabri Airport	Private	YNBR	NAA	30°19′09″S 149°49′38″E
Narrandera	Narrandera Airport	Public	YNAR	NRA	34°42′08″S 146°30′44″E
Narromine	Narromine Airport	Public	YNRM		32°12′52″S 148°13′29″E
Nowra	HMAS Albatross	Military	YSNW	NOA	34°56′56″S 150°32′13″E
Nyngan	Nyngan Airport	Public	YNYN	NYN	31°33′06″S 147°12′12″E
Palm Beach, Sydney	Palm Beach Water Airport	Public		LBH	33°35′15″S 151°19′26″E
Parkes	Parkes Airport	Public	YPKS	PKE	33°07′53″S 148°14′21″E
Pelican	Belmont Airport	Private	YPEC	BEO	33°04′00″S 151°38′54″E
Pooncarie	Pooncarie Airport	Public	YPCE		33°22′24″S 142°35′00″E
Port Macquarie	Port Macquarie Airport	Public	YPMQ	PQQ	31°26′09″S 152°51′48″E
Quirindi	Quirindi Airport	Public	YQDI	UIR	31°29′55″S 150°31′05″E
Red Hill	Warren Airport	Public	YWRN	QRR	31°44′00″S 147°48′12″E
Richmond, Sydney	RAAF Base Richmond	Military	YSRI	XRH	33°36′11″S 150°47′02″E
Rose Bay, Sydney	Rose Bay Water Airport	Public		RSE	33°52′14″S 151°15′19″E
Rylstone	Rylstone Airpark	Private	YRYL		32°46′25″S 149°59′35″E
Scone	Scone Airport	Private	YSCO	NSO	32°02′14″S 150°49′56″E
Singleton	Dochra Airfield	Military	YDOC		32°39′00″S 151°12′30″E
Somersby	Gosford Airport	Public	YSMB	GOS	33°22′14″S 151°18′01″E
Spring Hill	Orange Airport	Public	YORG	OAG	33°22′54″S 149°07′59″E
Tamworth	Tamworth Airport	Public	YSTW	TMW	31°05′02″S 150°50′58″E
Taree	Taree Airport	Private	YTRE	TRO	31°53′19″S 152°30′50″E
Temora	Temora Airport	Public	YTEM	TEM	34°25′18″S 147°30′42″E
The Oaks	The Oaks Airfield	Private	YOAS		34°04′58″S 150°33′36″E
Tibooburra	Tibooburra Airport	Public	YTIB	TYB	29°27′06″S 142°03′30″E
Tocumwal	Tocumwal Airport	Public	YTOC	TCW	35°48′39″S 145°36′15″E
Tumut	Tumut Airport	Public	YTMU	TUM	35°15′46″S 148°14′27″E
Wagga Wagga	Wagga Wagga Airport	Public	YSWG	WGA	35°09′55″S 147°27′59″E
Wagga Wagga	RAAF Base Wagga	Military			35°09′37″S 147°28′07″E
Walgett	Walgett Airport	Public	YWLG	WGE	30°02′00″S 148°07′30″E
Wallis Island	Forster (Wallis Island) Airport	Public	YFST	FOT	32°12′15″S 152°28′44″E
Warnervale, Central Coast	Warnervale (Central Coast) Airport	Public	YWVA		33°14′27″S 151°25′40″E
Wedderburn, Sydney	Wedderburn Airport	Private	YWBN		34°10′48″S 150°48′30″E
Wellington	Bodangora Airport	Public	YWEL		32°27′39″S 148°59′27″E
Wentworth	Wentworth Airport	Private	YWTO		34°05′18″S 141°53′30″E
West Wyalong	West Wyalong Airport	Public	YWWL	WWY	33°56′12″S 147°11′30″E
**Williamtown, Newcastle**	**Newcastle Airport**	Public	YWLM	NTL	32°47′42″S 151°50′04″E
Williamtown, Newcastle	RAAF Base Williamtown	Military	YWLM	NTL	32°47′42″S 151°50′04″E
Young	Young Airport	Public	YYNG	NGA	34°15′20″S 148°14′53″E

== Defunct airports ==
Community	Airport name	Type	ICAO	IATA	Coordinates
Castlereagh, Sydney	Castlereagh Aerodrome	Military			33°40′37″S 150°41′15″E
Cudal	Cudal Airport	Public	YCUA	CUG	33°16′33″S 148°46′9″E
Forster	Forster (Wallis Island) Airport	Public		FOT	32°11′57.37″S 152°29′21.4″E
Hoxton Park, Sydney	Hoxton Park Airport	Public	~~YHOX~~		33°54′35″S 150°51′08″E
Nabiac	RAAF Base Nabiac	Military			32°07′54″S 152°26′03″E
Penrith, Sydney	Fleurs Aerodrome	Military			33°51′48″S 150°46′30″E
Schofields, Sydney	RAAF Station Schofields	Military			33°42′49″S 150°52′16″E
Uranquinty	RAAF Base Uranquinty	Military			35°11′51″S 147°12′29″E
Woy Woy	Woy Woy Aerodrome	Military			33°30′15″S 151°19′10″E

== See also ==
- List of airports in Greater Sydney
- List of airports in Australia
