= Glen Innes Airport =

- IATA: GLI; ICAO: YGLI

Summary
- Airport type: Public
- Operator: Glen Innes Regional Airport Pty Ltd (Australia Asia Flight Training Pty Ltd)
- Location: Glen Innes, New South Wales
- Elevation AMSL: 3,433 ft / 1,046 m
- Coordinates: 29°40′30″S 151°41′24″E

Map
- Location in New South Wales

Runways
Direction	Length		Surface
Direction	m	ft	Surface
14/32	1,498	4,915	Asphalt
10/28	1,676	5,499	Gravel
- Sources: AIP

Glen Innes Airport (IATA: GLI, ICAO: YGLI) is a small airport located 5 NM (9.3 km; 5.8 mi) northwest of Glen Innes, New South Wales, Australia.

Unusually for a small town airport, the runway is sealed and of a reasonable length (1,500 m (4,900 ft) plus). This runway was constructed around the Second World War as a possible northern base for the Brisbane Line in the case of Japanese invasion. The airport is going under a major development with Glen Innes Regional Airport Pty Ltd committed to constructing a 600-student resident commercial aviation college. The school will prepare Australian and international students to graduate "airline ready" with full CASA licenses, up to Multi-Engine crew and instrument rating. Plans for the college include classrooms, operations facilities, serviced accommodations, recreation facilities, and simulation bays. The airport is connected to the town's water, sewerage and waste. A second runway will be sealed to 1,200m, and parallel sealed taxiways will be constructed in addition to new hardstands for up to 40 aircraft and hangars and fueling facilities for Jet A1 and Avgas. Glen Innes experiences excellent weather conditions for flying more than 350 days yearly.

== See also ==
- List of airports in New South Wales
