= Mudgee Airport =

- IATA: DGE; ICAO: YMDG

Summary
- Airport type: Public
- Owner: Mid-Western Regional Council
- Location: Mudgee, New South Wales
- Elevation AMSL: 1,545 ft (471 m)
- Coordinates: 32°33′45″S 149°36′40″E
- Website: www.midwestern.nsw.gov.au

Map
- Location in New South Wales

Runways
Direction	Length		Surface
Direction	m	ft	Surface
04/22	1,739	5,705	Asphalt
16/34	1,705	5,594	Grass
- Sources: Australian AIP and aerodrome chart

Mudgee Airport (IATA: DGE, ICAO: YMDG) is a regional airport located 3 nautical miles (5.6 km; 3.5 mi) north northeast of Mudgee, New South Wales, Australia. The airport is frequently used for technical training.

== History ==
In 1921 there was activity on the need for an aerodrome at Mudgee, with a proposal for privately owned air strip to be prepared near the town.

From as early as 1933 there was agitation for a licensed public aerodrome for Mudgee. The Mudgee Racecourse was used as a landing ground when the first passenger air service from Mudgee to Sydney commenced 3 August 1937 by Southern Airlines and Freighters Limited. Mudgee was the first stop on a service that proceeded to Dubbo, Narromine, Nyngan, Cobar, Wilcannia, then turned around at Broken Hill for the return trip. The aircraft was a two engined De Havilland Dragonfly.

Mudgee Racecourse was used as a landing Aerodrome for many years then in 1949 the Department of Civil Aviation cancelled the licence for the aerodrome as it was unsuitable to be a combined racecourse and an aerodrome. In 1954 the State Government rezoned the Racecourse land and redesignated it as an aerodrome site. In 1955 the aerodrome was re-licensed and reopened.

== Airlines and destinations ==
Charter and scenic flights are also operated by Commercial helicopters. Flights to Sydney resumed on 11 June 2015 after an 18 months break. Flights between Sydney and Mudgee ceased in December 2024 after FlyPelican discontinued its long standing services. Occasional flights to Bankstown Airport in Sydney make up most of the airports traffic.

== Incidents and accidents ==
- On 14 September 2014 two people were killed after their small aircraft crashed into a paddock while attempting to land at the airport.

== See also ==
- List of airports in New South Wales
