= Coolah Airport =

- IATA: CLH; ICAO: YCAH

Summary
- Airport type: Public
- Operator: Warrumbungle Shire Council
- Location: Coolah, New South Wales, Australia
- Elevation AMSL: 1,074 ft / 327 m
- Coordinates: 31°46′24″S 149°36′36″E

Map
- Location in New South Wales

Runways
Direction	Length		Surface
Direction	m	ft	Surface
08/26	1,074	3,524	Gravel
- Sources: Australian AIP

Coolah Airport (IATA: CLH, ICAO: YCAH) is located 6.5 nautical miles (12.0 km; 7.5 mi) northwest of Coolah, New South Wales, Australia.

== See also ==
- List of airports in New South Wales
