= Lismore Airport =

- IATA: LSY; ICAO: YLIS

Summary
- Airport type: Public
- Operator: Lismore City Council
- Location: Lismore, New South Wales, Australia
- Elevation AMSL: 35 ft (11 m)
- Coordinates: 28°49′41″S 153°15′36″E
- Website: www.lismore.nsw.gov.au

Map
- Location in New South Wales

Runways
Direction	Length		Surface
Direction	m	ft	Surface
15/33	1,647	5,404	Asphalt
- Sources: Australian AIP and aerodrome chart

Lismore Airport (IATA: LSY, ICAO: YLIS) is a regional airport located 2 nautical miles (3.7 km; 2.3 mi) south of Lismore in the Northern Rivers region of New South Wales, Australia.

It features a modern terminal building, with some secure parking facilities. The airport sustained 'extensive damage' during the 2022 eastern Australia floods.

The airport currently serves as a base for the Westpac Lifesaver Rescue Helicopter Service, Northern Rivers Aero Club, Airways Aviation and FAST Aviation

The airport ceased commercial passenger operations after Rex Airlines discontinued its service between Sydney and Lismore, ending its longstanding operation with the final flight operating in June 2022.

== Statistics ==
Lismore Airport was ranked 54th in Australia for the number of revenue passengers served in financial year 2009–2010 but dropped in 2010–11.

Annual passenger and aircraft statistics for Lismore Airport
Year	Revenue passengers	Aircraft movements
2001–02	33,287	2,406
2002–03	35,937	2,703
2003–04	56,049	3,907
2004–05	67,497	2,738
2005–06	64,715	2,696
2006–07	66,880	2,680
2007–08	68,778	2,695
2008–09	60,992	2,535
2009–10	54,928	2,464
2010–11	49,365	2,467

== See also ==
- List of airports in New South Wales
