= Liverpool Plains Shire (former) =

Former local government area in New South Wales, Australia

Liverpool Plains
- Local government area
- Country: Australia
- State: New South Wales
- Region: North West Slopes
- Established: 7 March 1906
- Abolished: 1 January 1980
- Council seat: Gunnedah

Liverpool Plains Shire was a local government area in the North West Slopes region of New South Wales, Australia.

Liverpool Plains Shire was proclaimed on 7 March 1906, one of 134 shires created after the passing of the Local Government (Shires) Act 1905.

The shire offices were in Gunnedah and urban centres in the Shire included Breeza, Carroll, Curlewis, Mullaley and Tambar Springs.

Liverpool Plains Shire amalgamated with the Municipality of Gunnedah to form Gunnedah Shire on 1 January 1980.
