= Palm Beach Water Airport =

Water airport in Sydney, New South Wales

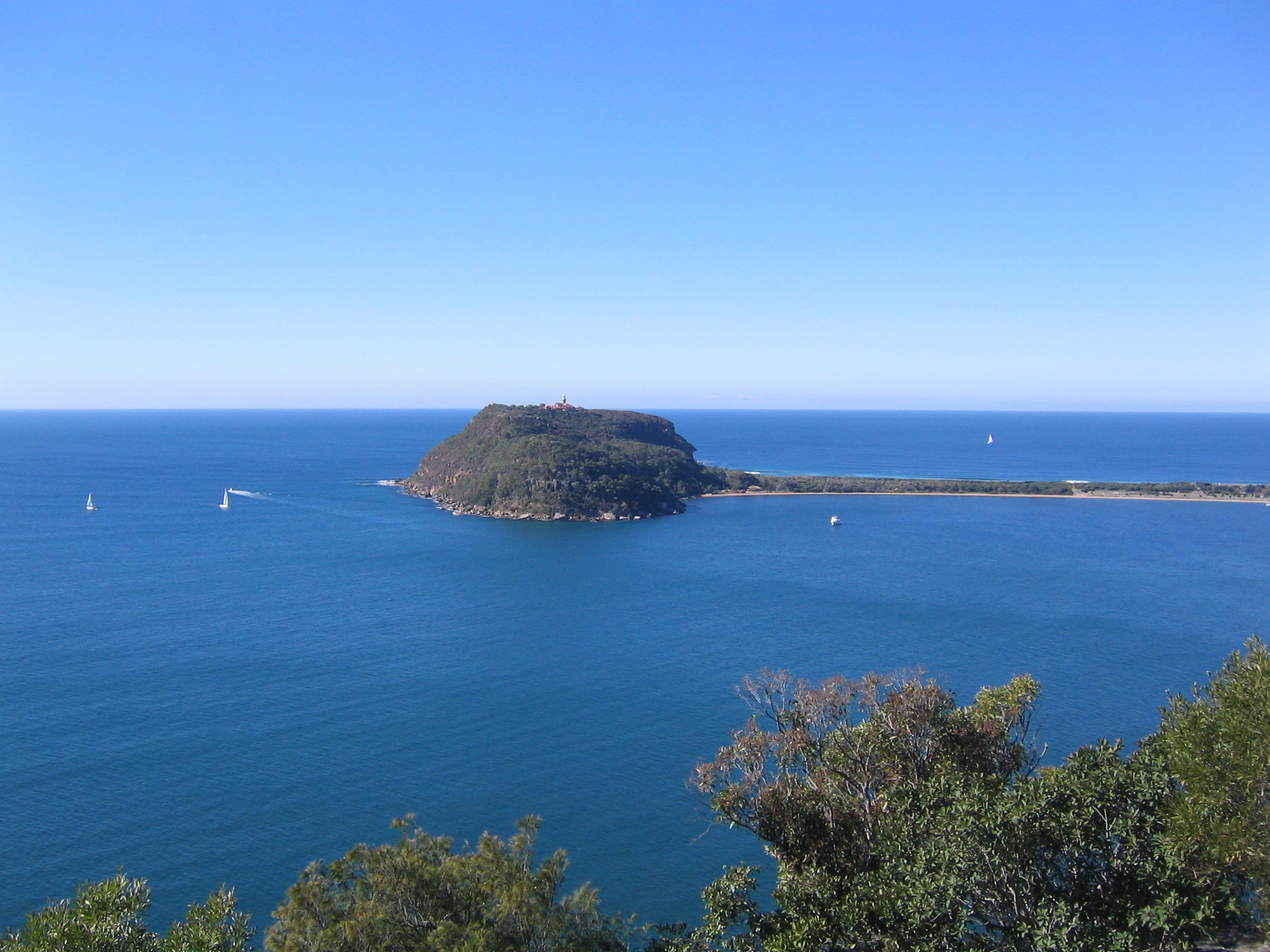
- Takeoff and landing area around the Barrenjoy Headland
- IATA: LBH; ICAO: none

Summary
- Airport type: Public
- Operator: Palm Beach Seaplanes
- Location: Palm Beach, New South Wales
- Elevation AMSL: 0 ft / 0 m
- Coordinates: 33°35′15″S 151°19′26″E

Map
- Location in New South Wales

Runways
Direction	Length		Surface
Direction	ft	m	Surface
n/a	n/a	n/a	Water

Palm Beach Water Airport (IATA: LBH) is a water aerodrome used by seaplanes. It is located in the suburb of Palm Beach, Sydney, New South Wales, Australia.

== Airlines ==
- Palm Beach Seaplanes
- Sydney By Seaplane

== See also ==
- List of airports in Greater Sydney
- List of airports in New South Wales
