= Balranald Airport =

- IATA: BZD; ICAO: YBRN

Summary
- Airport type: Public
- Operator: Balranald Shire Council
- Location: Balranald, New South Wales, Australia
- Elevation AMSL: 210 ft / 64 m
- Coordinates: 34°37′24″S 143°34′42″E
- Website: balranald.nsw.gov.au/balranald-aerodrome

Map
- Location in New South Wales

Runways
Direction	Length		Surface
Direction	m	ft	Surface
08/26	650	2,133	Grass
18/36	1,185	3,888	Asphalt
- Sources: Airservices Australia

Balranald Airport (IATA: BZD, ICAO: YBRN) is a small airport located 1 nautical mile (1.9 km; 1.2 mi) northeast of Balranald, New South Wales, Australia. It sits at altitude of 210 ft (64 m), and has two runways: 18/36, an asphalt runway 1,185 m (3,888 ft) long, and 08/26, a grass runway 650 m (2,133 ft) long.

== See also ==
- List of airports in New South Wales
