= Goodooga Airport =

Airport in Goodooga, New South Wales, Australia

- IATA: none; ICAO: YGDA

Summary
- Airport type: Public
- Operator: Brewarrina Shire Council
- Location: Goodooga, New South Wales
- Elevation AMSL: 459 ft / 140 m
- Coordinates: 29°04′24″S 147°22′24″E

Map
- Location in New South Wales

Runways
Direction	Length		Surface
Direction	m	ft	Surface
12/30	1,076	3,530	Asphalt
- Sources: Australian AIP

Goodooga Airport (ICAO: YGDA) is located 5.5 nautical miles (10.2 km; 6.3 mi) west of Goodooga, New South Wales, Australia.

== See also ==
- List of airports in New South Wales
