= Pooncarie Airport =

- IATA: none; ICAO: YPCE

Summary
- Airport type: Public
- Operator: Shire of Wentworth
- Location: Pooncarie, New South Wales
- Elevation AMSL: 164 ft (50 m)
- Coordinates: 33°22′24″S 142°35′00″E

Map
- Location in New South Wales

Runways
Direction	Length		Surface
Direction	m	ft	Surface
06/24	1,053	3,455	Gravel
- Sources: Australian AIP

Pooncarie Airport (ICAO: YPCE) is located at Pooncarie, New South Wales, Australia. The airstrip, located next to the racecourse, was built in the 1960s to support operations by the Royal Flying Doctor Service but is also used occasionally by charter flights.

== See also ==
- List of airports in New South Wales
