= Condobolin Airport =

Aerodrome in New South Wales, Australia

- IATA: CBX; ICAO: YCDO

Summary
- Owner/Operator: Lachlan Shire Council
- Serves: Condobolin, New South Wales and surrounding area
- Location: Condobolin, New South Wales, Australia
- Elevation AMSL: 650 ft / 198 m
- Coordinates: 33°03′54″S 147°12′30″E

Map
- Location in New South Wales

Runways
Direction	Length		Surface
Direction	m	ft	Surface
01/19	1,372	4,501	Asphalt
10/28	1,203	3,947	Grassed red clay
- Sources: AIP

Condobolin Airport (IATA: CBX, ICAO: YCDO) is a small registered aerodrome located 3.5 nautical miles (6.5 km; 4.0 mi) northeast of Condobolin, New South Wales, Australia. The Lachlan Shire Council currently maintains the airport.

== See also ==
- List of airports in New South Wales
