= Tibooburra Airport =

Airport at Tibooburra, New South Wales, Australia

- IATA: TYB; ICAO: YTIB

Summary
- Airport type: Public
- Operator: NSW Department of Lands
- Location: Tibooburra, New South Wales
- Elevation AMSL: 584 ft / 178 m
- Coordinates: 29°27′06″S 142°03′30″E

Map
- Location in New South Wales

Runways
Direction	Length		Surface
Direction	m	ft	Surface
15/33	1,532	5,026	Gravel
02/20	976	3,202	Asphalt
- Sources: Australian AIP and aerodrome chart

Tibooburra Airport (IATA: TYB, ICAO: YTIB) is a small airport located 3 nautical miles (5.6 km; 3.5 mi) east of Tibooburra, New South Wales, Australia.

== See also ==
- List of airports in New South Wales
