= McArthur River mine =

McArthur River mine may refer to:

- McArthur River uranium mine in Saskatchewan, Canada
- McArthur River zinc mine in Northern Territory, Australia
