= Tocumwal Airport =

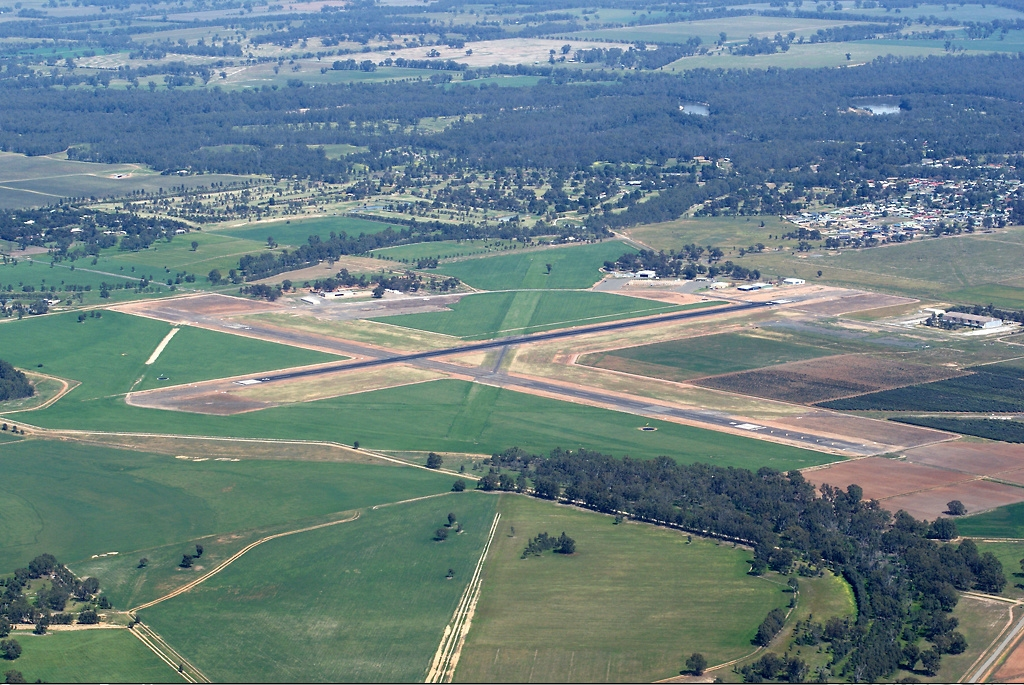
- IATA: TCW; ICAO: YTOC

Summary
- Airport type: Public
- Operator: Berrigan Shire Council
- Location: Tocumwal, New South Wales
- Elevation AMSL: 372 ft (113 m)
- Coordinates: 35°48′39″S 145°36′15″E

Map
- Location in New South Wales

Runways
Direction	Length		Surface
Direction	m	ft	Surface
18/36	1,273	4,177	Sealed
09/27	1,200	3,937	Sealed
- Sources: Australian AIP and aerodrome chart

Tocumwal Airport (IATA: TCW, ICAO: YTOC) is located 1 nautical mile (1.9 km; 1.2 mi) east of Tocumwal, New South Wales, Australia. Both runways have parallel runways labelled for glider operations.

== History ==
In February 1942, construction work commenced for an airfield at Tocumwal near the Newell Highway. The project was highly prioritized, and over 7,000 US servicemen were deployed to assist in labour. By May 1942, it was mostly completed, and was named McIntyre Field in honor of Captain Patrick W. McIntyre, who was killed on 5 June, 1942, whilst testing a bombardment aircraft. The airfield was equipped with four 6,000 foot long runways, 70 miles worth of taxiways and road with aircraft dispersals, 5 large wooden hangars to house B-24 Liberators, 450 buildings, ammunition bunkers, engine test bays, and a 200-bed hospital. Subsequently, the United States Army Air Forces began using the airfield. On 9 November, 1942, the Royal Australian Air Force took over operations, and RAAF Station Tocumwal was officially established.

=== Post-war ===
On 13 September, 1946, Tocumwal Airfield became a care and maintenance unit. On 1 October, 1960, the RAAF disestablished Tocumwal Airfield as a base, leaving 50 aircraft for disposal organised by the Department of Supply. A closing ceremony was held, and was attended by Captain G. Pither and six officers from RAAF Base Laverton, and 60 Tocumwal residents. The Air Force flag was lowered for the final time at 10:15 AM, and was presented to the Shire County to be displayed at the local memorial hall. On 15 October, 1960, ownership of the airfield was transferred to the Department of Civil Aviation where it became a glider field today. The remaining four large wooden hangars were used for storage, including wheat and grain stocks and later a dozen Republic of Singapore Air Force Hawker Hunters acquired by an Australian dealer.

== See also ==
- List of airports in New South Wales
