= Inverell Airport =

- IATA: IVR; ICAO: YIVL

Summary
- Airport type: Public
- Operator: Inverell Shire Council
- Location: Inverell, New South Wales, Australia
- Elevation AMSL: 2,667 ft / 813 m
- Coordinates: 29°53′18″S 151°08′39″E

Map
- Location in New South Wales

Runways
Direction	Length		Surface
Direction	m	ft	Surface
16/34	2,114	6,936	Asphalt
04/22	700	2,297	Grass/Dirt
- Sources: Australian AIP and aerodrome chart

Inverell Airport (IATA: IVR, ICAO: YIVL) is an airport located approximately 15 km (9.3 mi) south of Inverell, New South Wales, Australia.

== Airlines and destinations ==
Airlines	Destinations
Link Airways	Brisbane

== See also ==
- List of airports in New South Wales
