= Collarenebri Airport =

- IATA: CRB; ICAO: YCBR

Summary
- Airport type: Public
- Location: Collarenebri, New South Wales
- Elevation AMSL: 152 ft / 46 m
- Coordinates: 29°31′18″S 148°34′54″E

Map
- Location in New South Wales

Runways
Direction	Length		Surface
Direction	ft	m	Surface
18/36		1,218	Paved
04/22		654	Unknown
- Sources: AIP

Collarenebri Airport (IATA: CRB, ICAO: YCBR) is a small airport 1 nautical mile (1.9 km; 1.2 mi) north of Collarenebri, New South Wales, Australia.

== See also ==
- List of airports in New South Wales
