= Tumut Airport =

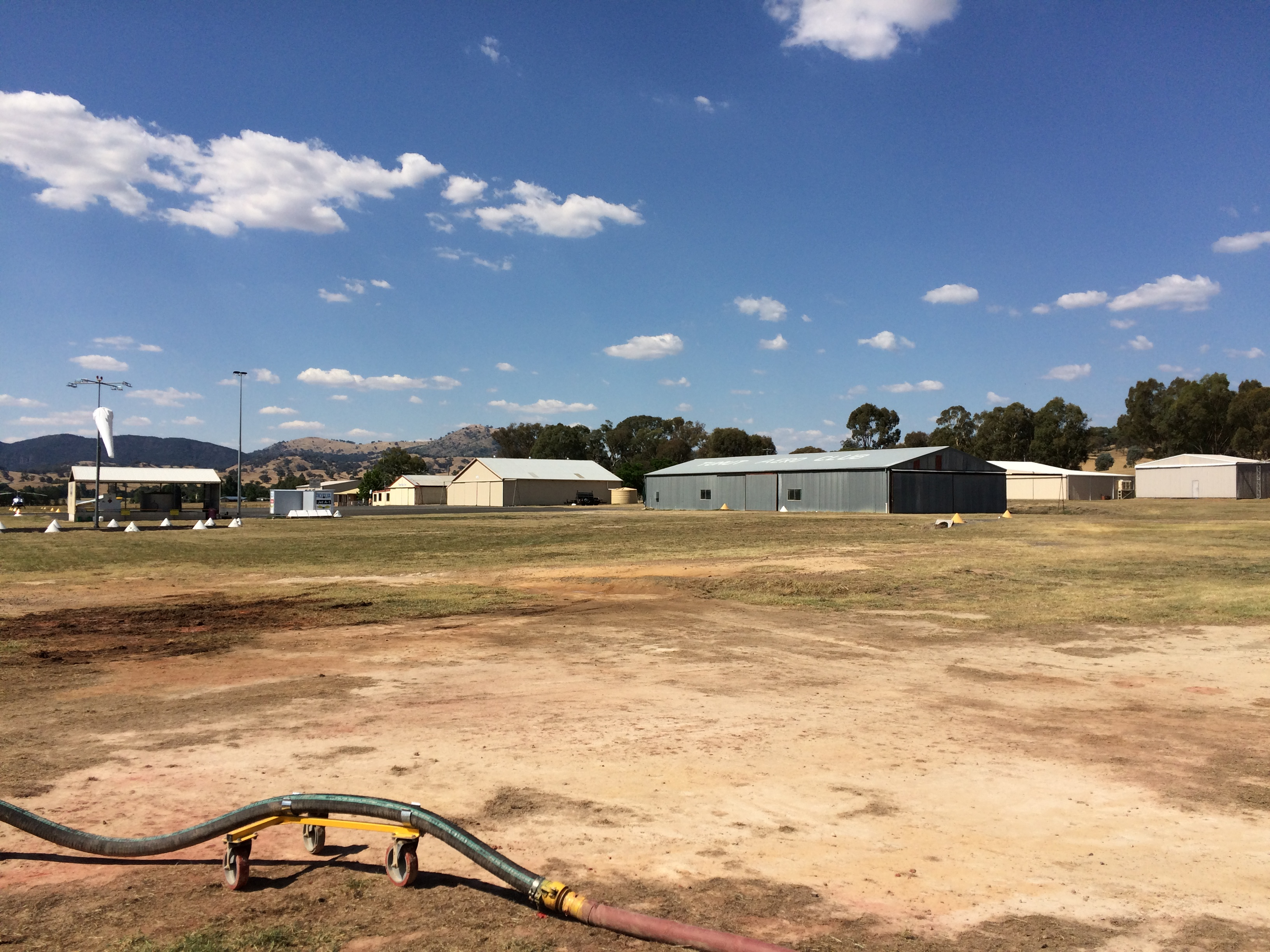
- IATA: TUM; ICAO: YTMU

Summary
- Airport type: Public
- Operator: Snowy Valleys Council
- Location: Tumut, New South Wales
- Elevation AMSL: 863 ft / 263 m
- Coordinates: 35°15′46″S 148°14′27″E

Map
- Location in New South Wales

Runways
Direction	Length		Surface
Direction	m	ft	Surface
17/35	1,060	3,478	Asphalt
- Sources: Australian AIP and aerodrome chart

Tumut Airport (/ˈtjuːmət/) (IATA: TUM, ICAO: YTMU) is a small airport in Tumut, New South Wales, Australia. The airport was constructed during the 1960s, replacing an earlier airfield known as Butler's Field on a nearby private property. The airport caters mostly to general aviation and recreational category aircraft, and is located within two hours flying time of both Sydney and Melbourne, half an hour from Canberra and within minutes of Wagga Wagga Airport offering major aircraft maintenance facilities.

The main tenant at the airfield is the Tumut Aero Club, who offer flight training and hangar rental on-site. The Aero Club also maintains the Tumut Airport Lodge, a conversion of the former terminal building that functions as an accommodation facility for up to four people aimed at visiting pilots and those stranded at the airport by weather. The Blue Sky Tumut Aviation Estate airpark is currently under development at the northern end of the field. Recreational flight training provider Air Escape is based at Tumut and is accredited by Recreational Aviation Australia.

The airport has one sealed runway measuring 1,060 m (3,480 ft) x 18 m (59 ft) suitable for use by aircraft with a maximum takeoff weight of up to 5,700 kg (12,600 lb). Emergency runway lighting is available allowing night operations for medical evacuations. Refuelling facilities are also provided.

== See also ==
- List of airports in New South Wales
