= Dochra Airfield =

- IATA: none; ICAO: YDOC

Summary
- Airport type: Military
- Operator: Australian Army District Support Unit
- Location: Singleton, New South Wales
- Elevation AMSL: 228 ft / 69 m
- Coordinates: 32°39′00″S 151°12′30″E

Map
- Location in New South Wales

Runways
Direction	Length		Surface
Direction	ft	m	Surface
18/36	3,281	1,000	Gravel
- Sources: AIP

Dochra Airfield (ICAO: YDOC) is an Australian Army airbase located at Singleton, New South Wales, Australia.

== See also ==
- List of airports in New South Wales
