= Warren Airport (New South Wales) =

- IATA: none; ICAO: YWRN

Summary
- Airport type: Public
- Operator: Warren Shire Council
- Serves: Warren
- Location: Red Hill, New South Wales, Australia
- Elevation AMSL: 669 ft / 204 m
- Coordinates: 31°44′00″S 147°48′12″E

Map
- Location in New South Wales

Runways
Direction	Length		Surface
Direction	m	ft	Surface
09/27	1,187	3,894	Paved
03/21	1,055	3,461	Clay
- Sources: AIP

Warren Airport (ICAO: YWRN) is located in Red Hill, 3 nautical miles (5.6 km; 3.5 mi) South of Warren, in New South Wales, Australia.

== See also ==
- List of airports in New South Wales
