= Quirindi Airport =

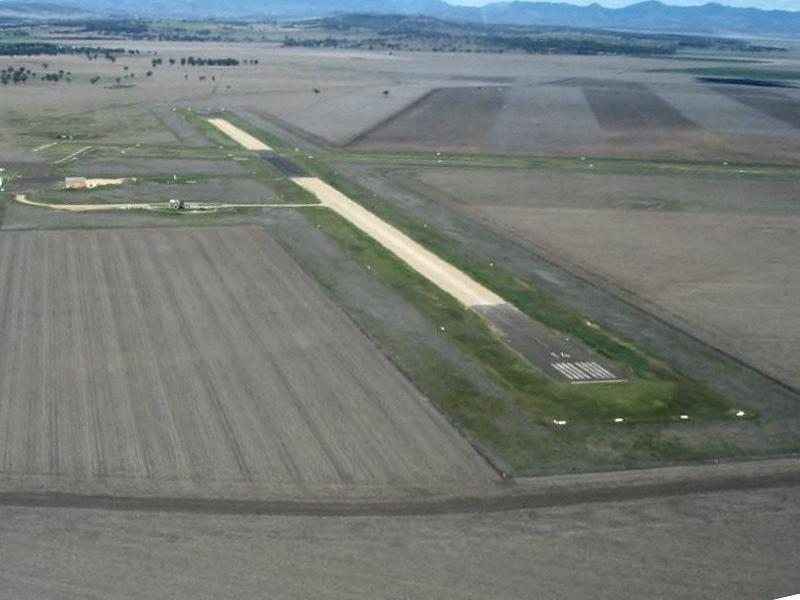
- IATA: UIR; ICAO: YQDI

Summary
- Airport type: Public
- Operator: Liverpool Plains Shire Council
- Location: Quirindi, New South Wales
- Elevation AMSL: 1,054 ft / 321 m
- Coordinates: 31°29′55″S 150°31′05″E

Map
- Location in New South Wales

Runways
Direction	Length		Surface
Direction	m	ft	Surface
14/32	1,770	5,807
06/24	1,106	3,629	Asphalt
- Sources: Australian AIP and aerodrome chart

Quirindi Airport (IATA: UIR, ICAO: YQDI) is a small airport located 8.25 NM (15.28 km; 9.49 mi) west of Quirindi, New South Wales, Australia. The airport is sometimes used by trainee military pilots from BAe Systems College for circuits as an alternative to Tamworth Airport.

== See also ==
- List of airports in New South Wales
