= Mungindi Airport =

- IATA: none; ICAO: YMGI

Summary
- Airport type: Public
- Operator: Moree Plains Shire Council
- Location: Mungindi, New South Wales
- Elevation AMSL: 600 ft / 181 m
- Coordinates: 28°58′00″S 149°03′00″E

Map
- Location of airport in New South Wales

Runways
Direction	Length		Surface
Direction	ft	m	Surface
12/30	4,620	1,400	Asphalt
- Sources: Australian AIP and aerodrome chart

Mungindi Airport is a public airport in Moree Plains Shire, located 4 km (2.5 mi) north east of Mungindi, New South Wales Australia. The airport is predominantly used for general aviation and agricultural purposes as well as handling aeromedical patient transfers from the Mungindi Hospital. Federal government funding secured in 2009/10 allowed upgrades to the airport, including sealing the runway which is equipped with pilot-activated lighting allowing 24-hour operations.

== See also ==
- List of airports in New South Wales
