= West Wyalong Airport =

Airport at West Wyalong, New Soiuth Wales

- IATA: WWY; ICAO: YWWL

Summary
- Airport type: Private
- Operator: Bland Shire Council
- Serves: Bland Shire
- Location: West Wyalong, New South Wales, Australia
- Elevation AMSL: 859 ft (262 m)
- Coordinates: 33°56′12″S 147°11′30″E

Map
- Location in New South Wales

Runways
Direction	Length		Surface
Direction	m	ft	Surface
04/22	780	2,559	Gravel
09/27	1,585	5,200	Asphalt
- Sources: Australian AIP and aerodrome chart

West Wyalong Airport (IATA: WWY, ICAO: YWWL) is an airport located 1 nautical mile (1.9 km; 1.2 mi) south West Wyalong, New South Wales, Australia. The airport is operated by the Bland Shire Council.

== Facilities and aircraft ==
West Wyalong Airport has two runways:

- Runway 09/27: 1,585 m × 30 m (5,200 ft × 98 ft), surface: asphalt
- Runway 04/22: 780 m × 18 m (2,559 ft × 59 ft), surface: gravel

== Airlines and destinations ==
Currently West Wyalong is not serviced by any scheduled flights, but throughout the airport's history it has been served by many regional airlines. East-West Airlines operated services to Sydney from 1953 until 1975, initially using converted ex-military Lockheed Hudson aircraft, later replaced by the Douglas DC-3 and Fokker F27 Friendship. These services were discontinued with the withdrawal of Government subsidy on 30 June 1975.

A number of smaller carriers would later service the West Wyalong – Sydney route, including Country Connection Airlines who provided 11 services per week between 1991 and 2001 using Piper Chieftain aircraft.

Rex Airlines provided twice weekly service to Sydney commencing in March 2005. The airline carried 1,928 passengers in the first six months, but it ceased operating the flights in September 2007.

== See also ==
- List of airports in New South Wales
