= Corowa Airport =

- IATA: CWW; ICAO: YCOR

Summary
- Airport type: Public
- Operator: Federation Council
- Location: Corowa, New South Wales
- Elevation AMSL: 469 ft / 143 m
- Coordinates: 35°59′24″S 146°21′06″E

Map
- Location in New South Wales

Runways
Direction	Length		Surface
Direction	m	ft	Surface
14/32	1,524	5,000	Asphalt
05/23	1,827	5,994	Asphalt
- Sources: AIP

Corowa Airport (IATA: CWW, ICAO: YCOR) is a small airport located 2 nautical miles (3.7 km; 2.3 mi) west of Corowa, New South Wales, Australia.

== See also ==
- List of airports in New South Wales
