= Narromine Airport =

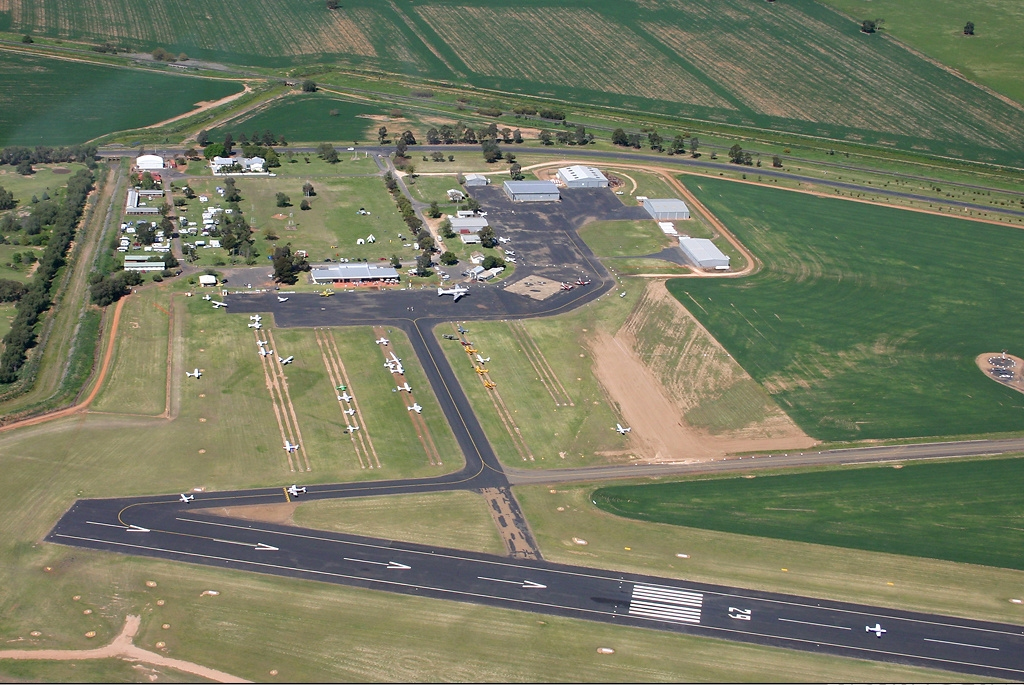
- IATA: none; ICAO: YNRM

Summary
- Airport type: Public
- Operator: Narromine Shire Council
- Location: Narromine, New South Wales
- Elevation AMSL: 782 ft / 238 m
- Coordinates: 32°12′52″S 148°13′29″E

Map
- Location in New South Wales

Runways
Direction	Length		Surface
Direction	m	ft	Surface
11/29	1,521	4,990	Asphalt
11/29 (glider)	812	2,664	Grass
04/22	1,100	3,609	Asphalt
04/22 (glider)	1,042	3,419	Grass
18/36 (glider)	848	2,782	Grass
- Sources: Australian AIP and aerodrome chart

Narromine Airport (ICAO: YNRM) is a small airport in Narromine, New South Wales, Australia. There are significant gliding operations at the airport. Flying at Narromine started as early as 1919.

== See also ==
- List of airports in New South Wales
