= Bodangora Airport =

Aerodrome serving Wellington, New South Wales

Wellington/Bodangora Airport
- IATA: QEL; ICAO: YWEL

Summary
- Airport type: Public
- Owner/Operator: Dubbo Regional Council
- Serves: Wellington, and surrounding area.
- Location: Bodangora, New South Wales
- Elevation AMSL: 1,398 ft (426 m)
- Coordinates: 32.4626°S 148.9910°E

Map
- Location in New South Wales

Runways
Direction	Length		Surface
Direction	m	ft	Surface
13/31	1,500	4,921	Asphalt
03/25	900	2,953	Gravel
- Sources: Airservices Australia

Bodangora Airport (IATA: QEL, ICAO: YWEL), also known as Wellington/Bodangora Airport, is a small general aviation airport located 11 kilometres (6.8 mi) northeast of Wellington, New South Wales, Australia. It sits at altitude of 1,398 ft (426 m) and has two runways: 13/31, an asphalt runway 1,500 m (4,900 ft) long, and 03/25, a gravel runway 900 m (2,953 ft) long. Bodangara airport features an AeroClub Club House, as well as an AeroClub shed. It is a non-towered airport.

== Activities ==
Australian aerospace company AMSL Aero, with headquarters at Bankstown Airport in Sydney, use the airstrip at Bodangora to conduct test flights of a long-range, hydrogen powered VTOL aircraft, Vertiia. The aircraft has a range of 1000km, and can travel at 300kmph with a payload of up to 500kg. It can be configured for passenger, cargo or aeromedical purposes.

Bodangora Drags, organised by the Dubbo City Car Club, have been held at the aerodrome multiple times a year since the late 1980s, using an eighth-mile dragstrip on runway 13/31.

== History ==
In 2018, landing fees were introduced at the airport despite local opposition. In 2022, construction began on a hangar which was planned to be leased for commercial purposes, done as part of a plan to increase profitability at the airport.

== See also ==
- List of airports in New South Wales
