= Cooma–Polo Flat Airport =

- IATA: none; ICAO: YPFT

Summary
- Airport type: Public
- Owner: Cooma Polo Flat Holdings Pty Ltd
- Serves: Cooma, New South Wales
- Location: Polo Flat, New South Wales
- Elevation AMSL: 2,701 ft / 823 m
- Coordinates: 36°13′48″S 149°09′00″E

Map
- Location in New South Wales

Runways
Direction	Length		Surface
Direction	m	ft	Surface
12/30	663	2,175	Grass
18/36	663	2,175	Asphalt
- Sources: AIP

Cooma–Polo Flat Airport (ICAO: YPFT) is an unlicensed airfield located in Polo Flat, an industrial area of Cooma, New South Wales, Australia. The airfield is used primarily for recreational flying. Polo Flat is at a lower elevation than the nearby Cooma–Snowy Mountains Airport and is less prone to closure during bad weather and fog.

== History ==
Polo Flat airfield was established by 1921, when the aviation pioneer Charles Kingsford Smith arrived at the landing ground on a barnstorming visit to the region. In the 1950s and 60s, the airfield was further developed to service the Snowy Mountains Scheme and the original hangars and terminal building are still in use today.

In 1998, the 57 ha (140 acres) site was sold by the Snowy Mountains Hydro-electric Authority for private use. In 2001, the facilities were adapted by the new owners to provide facilities for training pilots with disabilities through the "Wheelies with Wings" charity organisation. In 2003 a flying school, Snowy Aviation Academy, was established at the site.

== Current operations ==
Polo Flat airport is currently closed to fixed wing aircraft.

== Accidents and incidents ==
- On 20 May 1976, a Pilatus PC-6 Turbo Porter aircraft, registration VH-SMB owned by the Snowy Mountains Hydroelectric Authority struck a radio tower and crashed on approach to Polo Flat, killing all four on board.

== See also ==
- List of airports in New South Wales
