= Somersby Airfield =

- IATA: GOS; ICAO: YSMB

Summary
- Airport type: Private
- Operator: Somersby Airfield Pty Ltd
- Location: Somersby, NSW, Australia
- Time zone: AEST (+10:00)
  - Summer (DST): AEDT (+11:00)
- Elevation AMSL: 830 ft / 253 m
- Coordinates: 33°22′04″S 151°17′59″E

Map
- Location in New South Wales

Runways
Direction	Length		Surface
Direction	ft	m	Surface
17/35	1,876	572	Grass

Somersby Airfield (ICAO: YSMB, IATA: GOS) is an airfield located in Somersby, New South Wales, Australia. It is 12 kilometres (7.5 mi) by road from the nearby city of Gosford. It is the sole aerodrome in Somersby, and does not serve scheduled commercial traffic.

The airfield is operated by Somersby Airfield Pty Ltd.

== Facilities ==
Somersby airport consists of a single runway and various hangars. It has a windsock as a runway feature and an aviation fuel supply. It also has a water supply and lavatories as passenger facilities.

== Operations ==
Microlight Adventures, a company that provides recreational joy flights on microlight aircraft, is based at Somersby airfield.

== Radio procedures ==
Somersby has no control center and pilots communicate over a Common Traffic Advisory Frequency.
