= Hay Airport =

Airport in New South Wales, Australia

- IATA: HXX; ICAO: YHAY

Summary
- Airport type: Public
- Operator: Hay Shire Council
- Serves: Hay, New South Wales, Australia
- Elevation AMSL: 305 ft / 93 m
- Coordinates: 34°31′53″S 144°49′47″E

Map
- Location in New South Wales

Runways
Direction	Length		Surface
Direction	m	ft	Surface
04/22	1,463	4,800	Asphalt
15/33	1,140	3,740	Clay
- Sources: Australian AIP and aerodrome chart

Hay Airport (IATA: HXX, ICAO: YHAY) is an airport serving Hay, a town in the western Riverina region of southwestern New South Wales in Australia. The airport is operated by the Hay Shire Council.

== Facilities ==
The airport resides at an elevation of 305 ft (93 m) above mean sea level. It has two runways: 04/22 with an asphalt surface measuring 1,463 m × 30 m (4,800 ft × 98 ft) and 15/33 with a clay surface measuring 1,140 m × 30 m (3,740 ft × 98 ft).

== See also ==
- List of airports in New South Wales
