= Brewarrina Airport =

- IATA: BWQ; ICAO: YBRW

Summary
- Airport type: Public
- Location: Brewarrina, New South Wales
- Elevation AMSL: 414 ft (126 m)
- Coordinates: 29°58′24″S 146°49′00″E

Map
- Location in New South Wales

Runways
Direction	Length		Surface
Direction	m	ft	Surface
03/21	1,386	4,547	Asphalt
- Source: AIP Enroute Supplement

Brewarrina Airport (IATA: BWQ, ICAO: YBRW) is a small airport located 2 nautical miles (3.7 km; 2.3 mi) west southwest of Brewarrina, New South Wales, Australia.

The Bureau of Meteorology maintains a doppler weather radar site at the airport, which was built in 2020 to address gaps in weather services in western New South Wales.

== Accidents and incidents ==
- On 20 January 2000, two gunmen robbed a Piper PA-31 Navajo that had just landed at the airport. The aircraft was operating a regular bank courier service that delivered cash to Brewarrina. On arrival at the airport, the gunmen drove to the plane and ordered the pilot to get out, handcuffing him to a fence along with two female couriers. They unsuccessfully attempted to restart the aircraft, before taking a number of parcels and fleeing in a car. Police located the vehicle burned-out but the two men, who made off with less than $1000, were never found.

== See also ==
- List of airports in New South Wales
