= Young Airport =

Airport serving Young, New Soiuth Wales, Australia

- IATA: NGA; ICAO: YYNG

Summary
- Airport type: Private
- Owner: Hilltops council
- Operator: Hilltops Council
- Serves: Young, New South Wales, Australia
- Elevation AMSL: 1,267 ft / 386 m
- Coordinates: 34°15′20″S 148°14′53″E

Map
- Location in New South Wales

Runways
Direction	Length		Surface
Direction	m	ft	Surface
01/19	1,220	4,003	Asphalt
- Sources: Australian AIP and aerodrome chart

Young Airport (IATA: NGA, ICAO: YYNG) is an airport serving Young, New South Wales, Australia. It is located 3.5 nautical miles (6.5 km; 4.0 mi) northwest of Young and operated by Hilltops Council.

== Facilities ==
The airport resides at an elevation of 1,267 ft (386 m) above sea level. It has one runway designated 01/19 with an asphalt surface measuring 1,220 m × 18 m (4,003 ft × 59 ft).

== Accidents and incidents ==
- On the evening of 11 June 1993 Monarch Airlines flight 301, a Piper PA-31-350 Navajo Chieftain flying from Sydney to Cootamundra via Young crashed 2.2 km (1.4 mi) from the airport while on approach to runway 01, killing all seven on board. The aircraft was attempting a third approach when the crash occurred. The investigation into the accident revealed the aircraft had been operating without a working autopilot and several other instruments in breach of regulations.

== See also ==
- List of airports in New South Wales
