= Taree Airport =

Airport in Taree, New South Wales, Australia

- IATA: TRO; ICAO: YTRE

Summary
- Airport type: Private
- Operator: Mid-Coast Council
- Location: Taree
- Elevation AMSL: 38 ft / 12 m
- Coordinates: 31°53′19″S 152°30′50″E
- Website: www.midcoast.nsw.gov.au

Map
- Location in New South Wales

Runways
Direction	Length		Surface
Direction	m	ft	Surface
04/22	1,504	4,934	Asphalt
12/30	564	1,850	Brown silt clay

Statistics (2010–11)
- Passengers: 19,250
- Aircraft movements: 3,518
- Sources: Australian AIP and aerodrome chart. Passengers and aircraft movements from BITRE.

Taree Airport (IATA: TRO, ICAO: YTRE) is an airport 3 nautical miles (5.6 km; 3.5 mi) northeast of the city of Taree, New South Wales, Australia. Taree is on the Mid North Coast, less than a four-hour drive from Sydney. The airport no longer maintains any scheduled services. The airport provides the community with a range of services including emergency services, medical flights, private charters, private aircraft, and air mail/courier services.

The facility is also used for defence force training and the Manning River Aero Club.

== Airport facilities ==
Taree is currently set to expand the airport to provide more facilities for pilots, businesses and airlines alike, This is also expected to boost the airport's presence.

A number of businesses including aircraft manufacturers and fabricators, an aircraft restorer and a skydiving school are based at Taree Airport.

== Airlines and destinations ==
FlyPelican operated services between Taree and Sydney until July 2022, when removal of government grants and rising fuel prices made the service unviable.

== See also ==
- List of airports in New South Wales
