= Forbes Airport =

- IATA: FRB; ICAO: YFBS

Summary
- Airport type: Public
- Operator: Forbes Shire Council
- Location: Forbes, New South Wales
- Elevation AMSL: 760 ft / 232 m
- Coordinates: 33°21′48″S 147°56′06″E

Map
- Location in New South Wales

Runways
Direction	Length		Surface
Direction	m	ft	Surface
09/27	1,228	4,029	Asphalt
- Sources: AIP

Forbes Airport (IATA: FRB, ICAO: YFBS) is a small airport located 4.8 nautical miles (8.9 km; 5.5 mi) west northwest of Forbes, New South Wales, Australia.

== See also ==
- List of airports in New South Wales
