= List of Qantas destinations =

A Qantas Airbus A330-303 at Haneda Airport, Tokyo, Japan

Qantas, the flag carrier of Australia, following is a list of destinations Qantas flies to as part of its scheduled services, as of January 2025.

Qantas flies to 65 domestic and to 35 international destinations in 23 countries across Africa, North America, South America, Asia, Europe, and Oceania. This list excludes destinations formed as a result of codeshare agreements, as well as destinations served by its subsidiaries, though QantasLink destinations are included.

== History ==
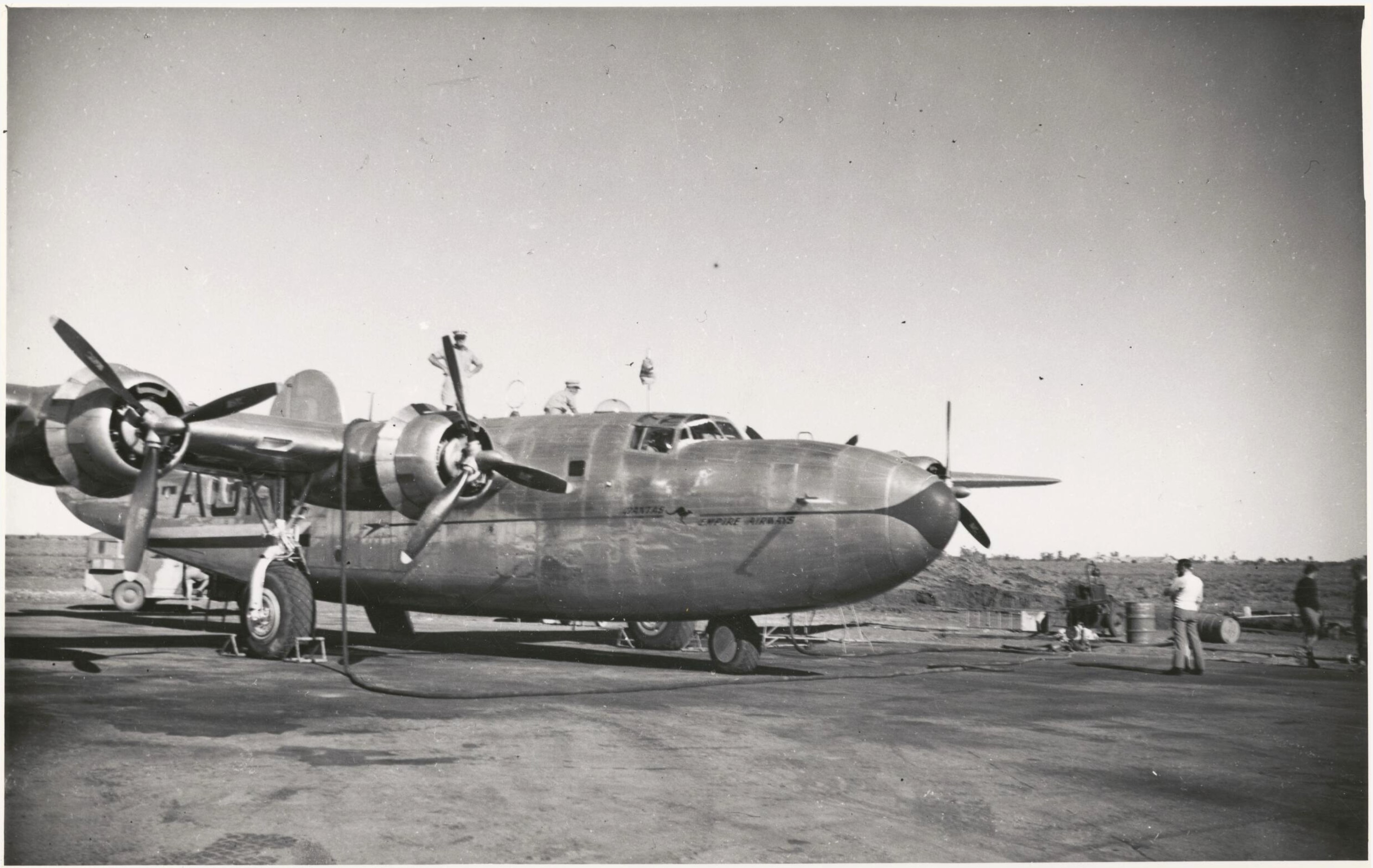
A Qantas Consolidated B-24 Liberator refuelling at Learmonth Airport prior to departing for Colombo in 1945

In 1938, Qantas began flying from Sydney to Singapore under wartime restrictions, services to New Zealand followed in April 1940 with Tasman Empire Airways Limited. Between 1945 and 1958, the Kangaroo Route was soon developed, with flights to London being announced in 1947 and flown with Super Constellation airliners. Qantas' network expanded significantly in later years, with destinations such as Japan, South Africa, and Hong Kong being added. Furthermore, as Qantas entered the jet age, the 1960s saw the addition of the Fiesta Route which focused services in the Americas, troop charter flights to Vietnam in 1966, weekly stops in Bali, Indonesia in 1969, and an increase of services to China increased in response to diplomatic relations in 1984.

Due to the COVID-19 pandemic, much of Qantas' network had been suspended, a situation that most airlines had experienced during this period. In 2021, it ended flights to Shanghai due to low-demand.

== List ==
Country	City	Airport	Notes	Refs
Argentina	Buenos Aires	Ministro Pistarini International Airport	Terminated	
Australia (Australian Capital Territory)	Canberra	Canberra Airport	Focus city	
Australia (Christmas Island)	Christmas Island	Christmas Island Airport		
Australia (Cocos (Keeling) Islands)	West Island	Cocos (Keeling) Islands Airport		
Australia (New South Wales)	Albury	Albury Airport		
Australia (New South Wales)	Armidale	Armidale Airport		
Australia (New South Wales)	Ballina	Ballina Byron Gateway Airport		
Australia (New South Wales)	Bathurst	Bathurst Airport	Terminated	
Australia (New South Wales)	Broken Hill	Broken Hill Airport		
Australia (New South Wales)	Coffs Harbour	Coffs Harbour Airport		
Australia (New South Wales)	Cooma	Cooma-Snowy Mountains Airport	Seasonal	
Australia (New South Wales)	Dubbo	Dubbo Airport		
Australia (New South Wales)	Lord Howe Island	Lord Howe Island Airport	Terminated	
Australia (New South Wales)	Moree	Moree Airport		
Australia (New South Wales)	Narrabri	Narrabri Airport	Terminated	
Australia (New South Wales)	Newcastle	Newcastle Airport		
Australia (New South Wales)	Orange	Orange Airport		
Australia (New South Wales)	Port Macquarie	Port Macquarie Airport		
Australia (New South Wales)	Sydney	Sydney Airport	Hub	
Australia (New South Wales)	Tamworth	Tamworth Airport		
Australia (New South Wales)	Taree	Taree Airport	Terminated	
Australia (New South Wales)	Wagga Wagga	Wagga Wagga Airport		
Australia (New South Wales)	Wollongong	Shellharbour Airport	Terminated	
Australia (Norfolk Island)	Norfolk Island	Norfolk Island Airport		
Australia (Northern Territory)	Alice Springs	Alice Springs Airport		
Australia (Northern Territory)	Ayers Rock	Ayers Rock Airport		
Australia (Northern Territory)	Darwin	Darwin International Airport	Focus city	
Australia (Northern Territory)	Gove	Gove Airport	Terminated	
Australia (Queensland)	Airlie Beach	Whitsunday Airport	Terminated	
Australia (Queensland)	Barcaldine	Barcaldine Airport		
Australia (Queensland)	Biloela	Biloela Airport	Terminated	
Australia (Queensland)	Blackall	Blackall Airport		
Australia (Queensland)	Blackwater	Blackwater Airport	Terminated	
Australia (Queensland)	Brisbane	Brisbane Airport	Hub	
Australia (Queensland)	Bundaberg	Bundaberg Airport		
Australia (Queensland)	Cairns	Cairns Airport	Focus city	
Australia (Queensland)	Charleville	Charleville Airport	Terminated	
Australia (Queensland)	Cloncurry	Cloncurry Airport		
Australia (Queensland)	Dunk Island	Dunk Island Airport	Terminated	
Australia (Queensland)	Emerald	Emerald Airport		
Australia (Queensland)	Gladstone	Gladstone Airport		
Australia (Queensland)	Gold Coast	Gold Coast Airport		
Australia (Queensland)	Hamilton Island	Hamilton Island Airport		
Australia (Queensland)	Hayman Island	−	Terminated	
Australia (Queensland)	Hervey Bay	Hervey Bay Airport		
Australia (Queensland)	Horn Island	Horn Island Airport		
Australia (Queensland)	Longreach	Longreach Airport		
Australia (Queensland)	Mackay	Mackay Airport		
Australia (Queensland)	Mount Isa	Mount Isa Airport		
Australia (Queensland)	Moranbah	Moranbah Airport		
Australia (Queensland)	Proserpine	Whitsunday Coast Airport		
Australia (Queensland)	Rockhampton	Rockhampton Airport		
Australia (Queensland)	Roma	Roma Airport	Terminated	
Australia (Queensland)	Sunshine Coast	Sunshine Coast Airport		
Australia (Queensland)	Toowoomba	Toowoomba Wellcamp Airport		
Australia (Queensland)	Townsville	Townsville Airport		
Australia (Queensland)	Weipa	Weipa Airport		
Australia (Queensland)	Winton	Winton Airport	Terminated	
Australia (South Australia)	Adelaide	Adelaide Airport	Focus city	
Australia (South Australia)	Kangaroo Island	Kingscote Airport		
Australia (South Australia)	Mount Gambier	Mount Gambier Airport	Terminated	
Australia (South Australia)	Port Lincoln	Port Lincoln Airport		
Australia (South Australia)	Whyalla	Whyalla Airport		
Australia (Tasmania)	Burnie	Burnie Airport		
Australia (Tasmania)	Devonport	Devonport Airport		
Australia (Tasmania)	Hobart	Hobart Airport	Focus city	
Australia (Tasmania)	Launceston	Launceston Airport		
Australia (Victoria)	Bendigo	Bendigo Airport		
Australia (Victoria)	Melbourne	Melbourne Airport	Hub	
Australia (Victoria)	Mildura	Mildura Airport		
Australia (Victoria)	Mount Hotham	Mount Hotham Airport	Terminated	
Australia (Western Australia)	Broome	Broome International Airport		
Australia (Western Australia)	Busselton	Busselton Airport		
Australia (Western Australia)	Exmouth	Learmonth Airport		
Australia (Western Australia)	Geraldton	Geraldton Airport		
Australia (Western Australia)	Kalgoorlie	Kalgoorlie-Boulder Airport		
Australia (Western Australia)	Karratha	Karratha Airport		
Australia (Western Australia)	Newman	Newman Airport		
Australia (Western Australia)	Paraburdoo	Paraburdoo Airport		
Australia (Western Australia)	Perth	Perth Airport	Hub	
Australia (Western Australia)	Port Hedland	Port Hedland International Airport		
Australia (Western Australia)	Tom Price	Tom Price Airport	Terminated	
Austria	Vienna	Vienna International Airport	Terminated	
Bahamas	Nassau	Lynden Pindling International Airport	Terminated	
Bahrain	Bahrain	Bahrain International Airport	Terminated	
Bermuda	Bermuda	L.F. Wade International Airport	Terminated	
Canada	Toronto	Toronto Pearson International Airport	Terminated	
Canada	Vancouver	Vancouver International Airport		
Chile	Santiago	Arturo Merino Benítez International Airport		
China	Beijing	Beijing Capital International Airport	Terminated	
China	Shanghai	Shanghai Pudong International Airport	Terminated	
Egypt	Cairo	Cairo International Airport	Terminated	
Fiji	Nadi	Nadi International Airport		
France	Paris	Charles de Gaulle Airport		
France	Paris	Orly Airport	Terminated	
French Polynesia	Papeete	Faa'a International Airport	Terminated	
Germany	Frankfurt	Frankfurt Airport	Terminated	
Greece	Athens	Ellinikon International Airport	Airport closed	
Hong Kong	Hong Kong	Hong Kong International Airport		
Hong Kong	Hong Kong	Kai Tak Airport	Airport closed	
India	Bengaluru	Kempegowda International Airport		
India	Delhi	Indira Gandhi International Airport		
India	Kolkata	Netaji Subhas Chandra Bose International Airport	Terminated	
India	Mumbai	Chhatrapati Shivaji Maharaj International Airport	Terminated	
Indonesia	Denpasar	Ngurah Rai International Airport		
Indonesia	Jakarta	Soekarno–Hatta International Airport		
Iran	Tehran	Mehrabad International Airport	Terminated	
Italy	Rome	Leonardo da Vinci–Fiumicino Airport	Seasonal	
Japan	Fukuoka	Fukuoka Airport	Terminated	
Japan	Nagoya	Nagoya Komaki Airport	Terminated	
Japan	Osaka	Kansai International Airport	Terminated	
Japan	Sapporo	New Chitose Airport	Seasonal	
Japan	Tokyo	Haneda Airport		
Japan	Tokyo	Narita International Airport		
Malaysia	Kuala Lumpur	Kuala Lumpur International Airport	Terminated	
Malaysia	Kuala Lumpur	Sultan Abdul Aziz Shah Airport (Note: Kuala Lumpur's international traffic was taken over by Kuala Lumpur International Airport upon its inauguration in mid-1998.)	Terminated	
Mauritius	Mauritius	Sir Seewoosagur Ramgoolam International Airport	Terminated	
Mexico	Acapulco	Acapulco International Airport	Terminated	
Mexico	Mexico City	Mexico City International Airport	Terminated	
Netherlands	Amsterdam	Amsterdam Airport Schiphol	Terminated	
New Caledonia	Nouméa	La Tontouta International Airport		
New Zealand	Auckland	Auckland Airport		
New Zealand	Christchurch	Christchurch Airport		
New Zealand	Queenstown	Queenstown Airport		
New Zealand	Rotorua	Rotorua Airport	Terminated	
New Zealand	Wellington	Wellington Airport		
Pakistan	Karachi	Jinnah International Airport	Terminated	
Palau	Koror	Palau International Airport		
Papua New Guinea	Bulolo	Bulolo Airport	Terminated	
Papua New Guinea	Lae	Lae Airfield	Terminated	
Papua New Guinea	Madang	Madang Airport	Terminated	
Papua New Guinea	Port Moresby	Jacksons International Airport		
Papua New Guinea	Rabaul	Rabaul Airport	Terminated	
Papua New Guinea	Wau	Wau Airport	Terminated	
Philippines	Manila	Ninoy Aquino International Airport		
Samoa	Apia	Faleolo International Airport		
Serbia	Belgrade	Belgrade Nikola Tesla Airport	Terminated	
Singapore	Singapore	Changi Airport		
Singapore	Singapore	Singapore International Airport	Airport closed	
Solomon Islands	Honiara	Honiara International Airport		
South Africa	Cape Town	Cape Town International Airport	Begins 19 October 2027	
South Africa	Johannesburg	O. R. Tambo International Airport		
South Korea	Seoul	Gimpo International Airport (Note: Most international traffic at Gimpo Airport was taken over by Incheon Airport in 2001.)	Terminated	
South Korea	Seoul	Incheon International Airport	Terminated	
Syria	Damascus	Damascus International Airport	Terminated	
Taiwan	Taipei	Taoyuan International Airport	Terminated	
Thailand	Bangkok	Don Mueang International Airport (Note: Most international traffic at Don Mueang Airport was taken over by Suvarnabhumi Airport in 2001.)	Terminated	
Thailand	Bangkok	Suvarnabhumi Airport		
Timor-Leste	Dili	Presidente Nicolau Lobato International Airport		
Tonga	Nukuʻalofa	Fuaʻamotu International Airport		
Turkey	Istanbul	Atatürk Airport	Terminated	
United Arab Emirates	Dubai	Dubai International Airport	Terminated	
United Kingdom	London	Heathrow Airport		
United Kingdom	Manchester	Manchester Airport	Terminated	
United States	Atlanta	Hartsfield–Jackson Atlanta International Airport	Terminated	
United States	Boston	Logan International Airport	Terminated	
United States	Chicago	O'Hare International Airport	Terminated	
United States	Dallas/Fort Worth	Dallas Fort Worth International Airport		
United States	Honolulu	Daniel K. Inouye International Airport		
United States	Las Vegas	Harry Reid International Airport	Begins 29 December 2026	
United States	Los Angeles	Los Angeles International Airport		
United States	New York City	John F. Kennedy International Airport		
United States	San Francisco	San Francisco International Airport		
United States	Washington, D.C.	Dulles International Airport	Terminated	
Vanuatu	Port Vila	Bauerfield International Airport		
Vietnam	Ho Chi Minh City	Tan Son Nhat International Airport	Terminated	
Zimbabwe	Harare	Harare International Airport	Terminated	

== See also ==
- Kangaroo Route
- Wallaby Route
- Southern Cross Route
- Transport in Australia
