= JetGo =

Airline of Australia (2011–2018)

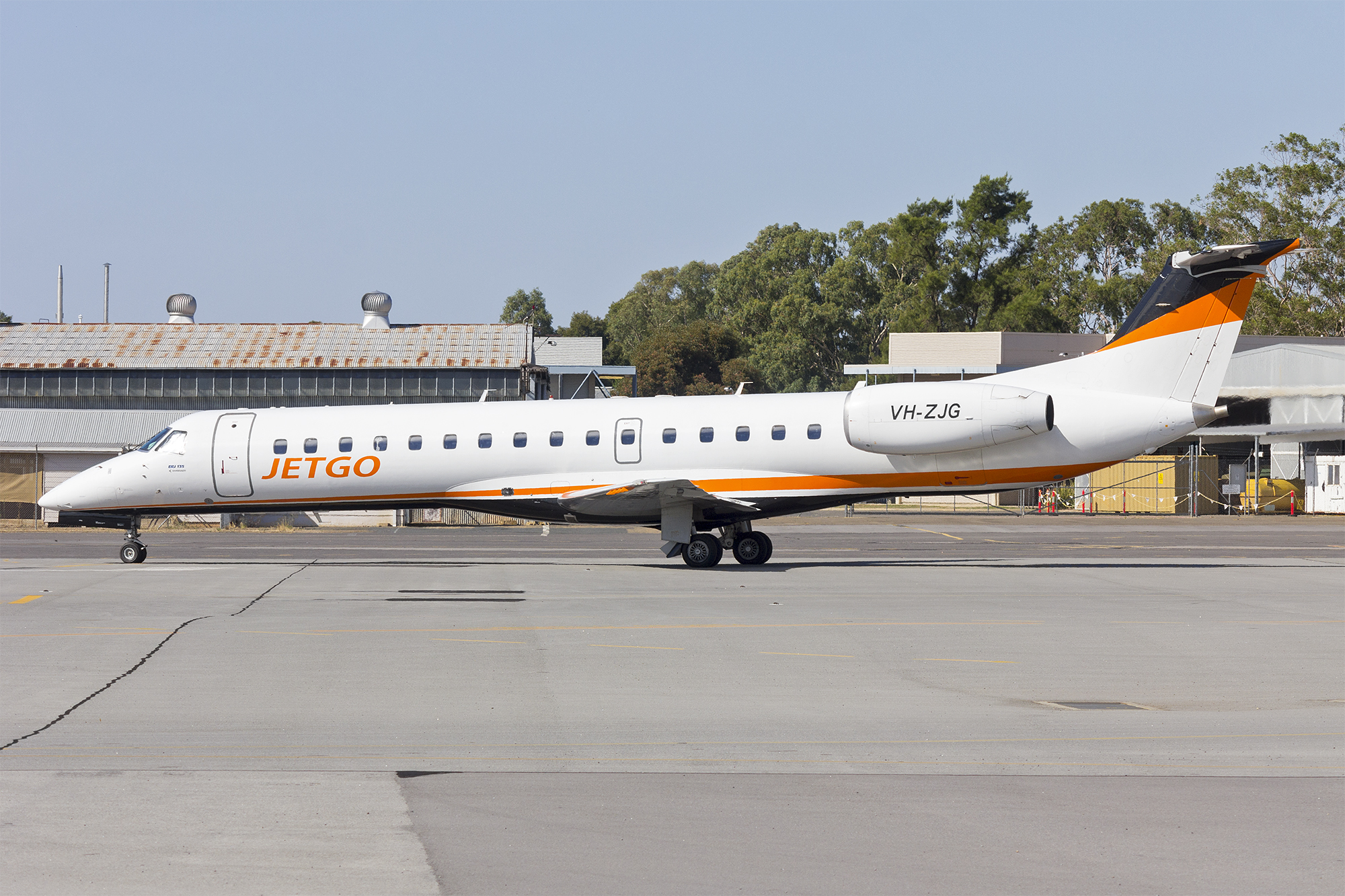
- A JetGo Embraer ERJ 145 at Wagga Wagga Airport
IATA	ICAO	Call sign
JG	JGO	JETGO
- Founded: 2011
- Ceased operations: 1 June 2018
- Headquarters: Eagle Farm, Queensland, Australia
- Key people: Jason Ryder (CEO)
- Website: www.jetgo.com

JetGo was an Australian regional airline and air charter company based at Eagle Farm, Queensland near Brisbane Airport.

It operated scheduled domestic passenger services in the Eastern states of Australia and charter services, particularly fly-in fly-out (FIFO) operations in support of the mining and resources sectors.

== Overview ==
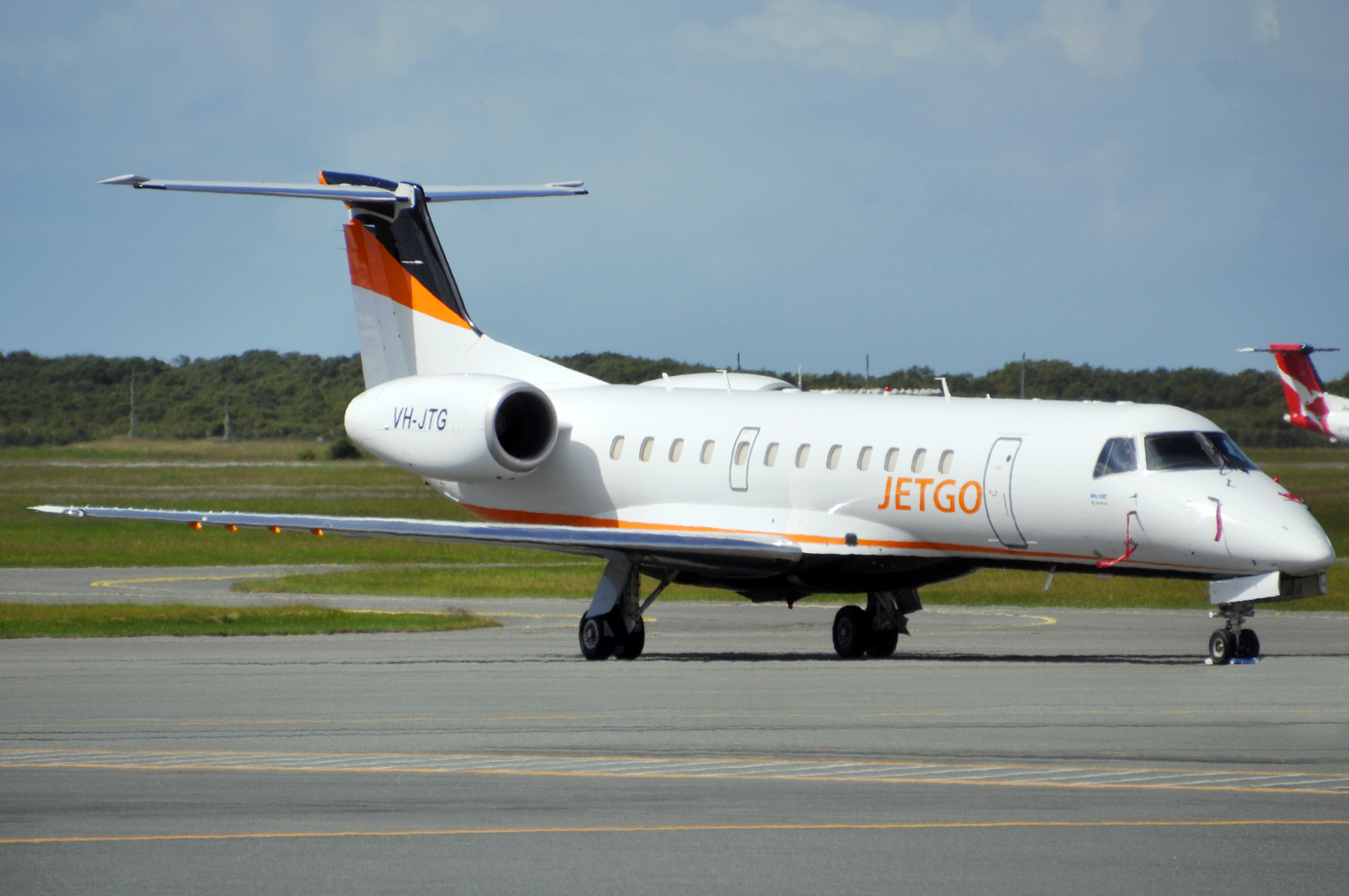
Embraer 135LR at Brisbane Airport, April 2012

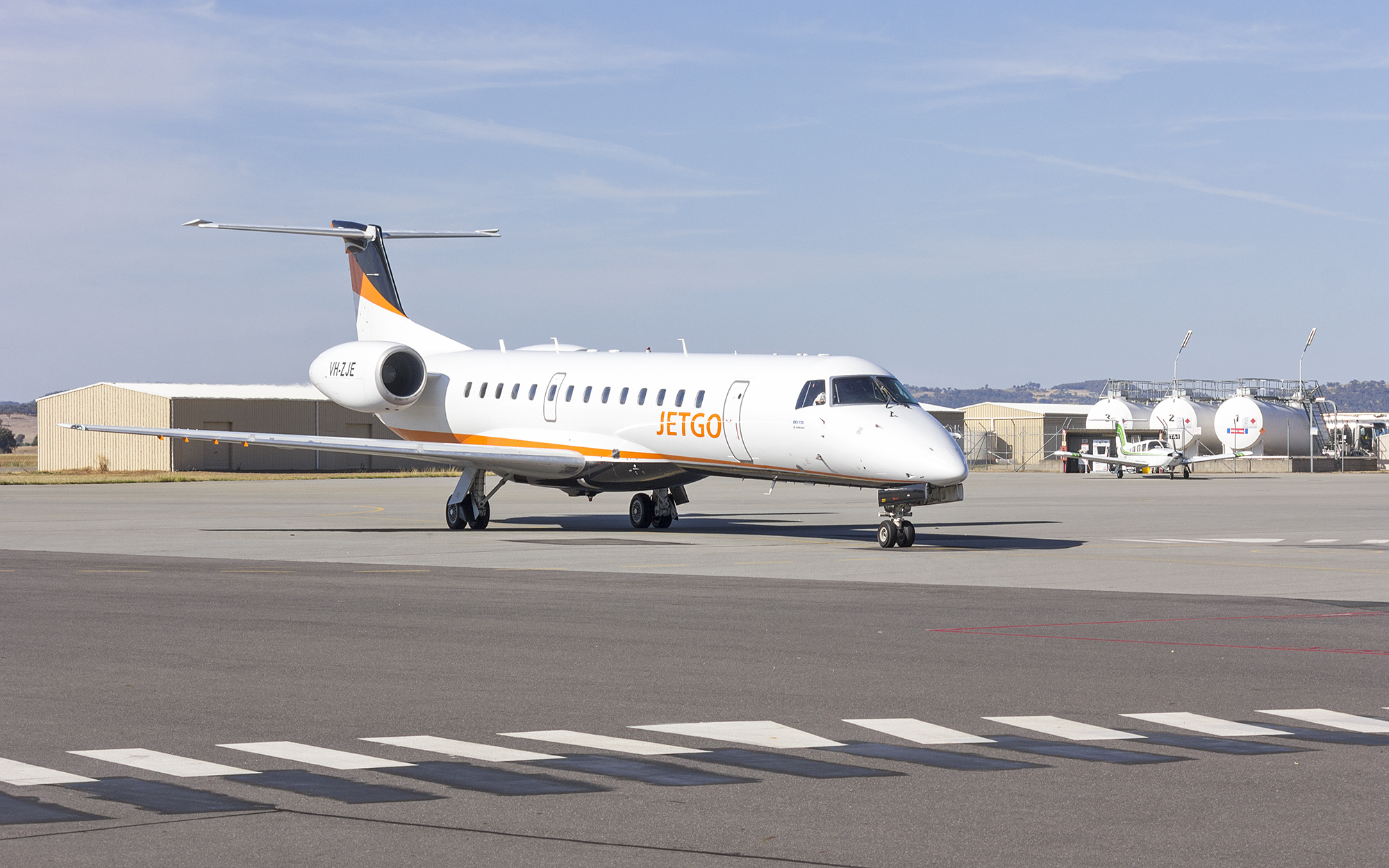
Embraer ERJ 140LR at Wagga Wagga Airport

JetGo took delivery of its first 37-seat Embraer 135 aircraft in March 2012. and was granted an air operator's certificate by the Civil Aviation Safety Authority (CASA) in May that year. As of July 2012, JetGo was operating FIFO and charter services throughout Australia. Despite having a business model initially focused on charter operations, following approval by CASA in October 2014, JetGo announced it would begin establishing regular public transport services. The company planned to grow its fleet to as many as 10 aircraft, focusing on longer regional routes in Queensland and New South Wales of between 400–1,200 km (249–746 mi).

JetGo announced two original routes from Sydney to Roma and Tamworth, both scheduled to commence in November 2014. After delaying the start of Sydney-Roma route however, the airline announced that the services would not proceed. In February 2015, Jetgo also announced that it would suspend its Sydney-Gladstone service, citing poor patronage.

Shortly after announcing its inaugural routes, JetGo announced that it would operate services between Brisbane and Tamworth, with up to 10 flights per week. The launch of the route was timed to coincide with the annual country music festival in January 2015.

On 1 June 2018, the airline was placed under voluntary administration, and all scheduled passenger operations were suspended. The Supreme Court of New South Wales ruled that JetGo to be liquidated, following the creditors report by the administrators that showed it owed $38 million to creditors and may have been trading while insolvent since 30 June 2016.

== Destinations ==
During the period of operation JetGo flew to the following destinations:

- New South Wales
  - Albury (Albury Airport)
  - Dubbo (Dubbo Regional Airport)
  - Port Macquarie (Port Macquarie Airport)
  - Sydney (Sydney Airport)
  - Tamworth (Tamworth Airport)
  - Wagga Wagga (Wagga Wagga Airport)
  - Wollongong (Shellharbour Airport)
- Queensland
  - Barcaldine (Barcaldine Airport, charter)
  - Brisbane (Brisbane Airport)
  - Gladstone (Gladstone Airport)
  - Gold Coast (Gold Coast Airport)
  - Hervey Bay (Hervey Bay Airport)
  - Middlemount (Middlemount Airport, charter)
  - Osborne Mine (charter)
  - Rockhampton (Rockhampton Airport)
  - Townsville (Townsville Airport)
- Victoria
  - Melbourne (Avalon Airport)
  - Melbourne (Essendon Airport)

== Fleet ==
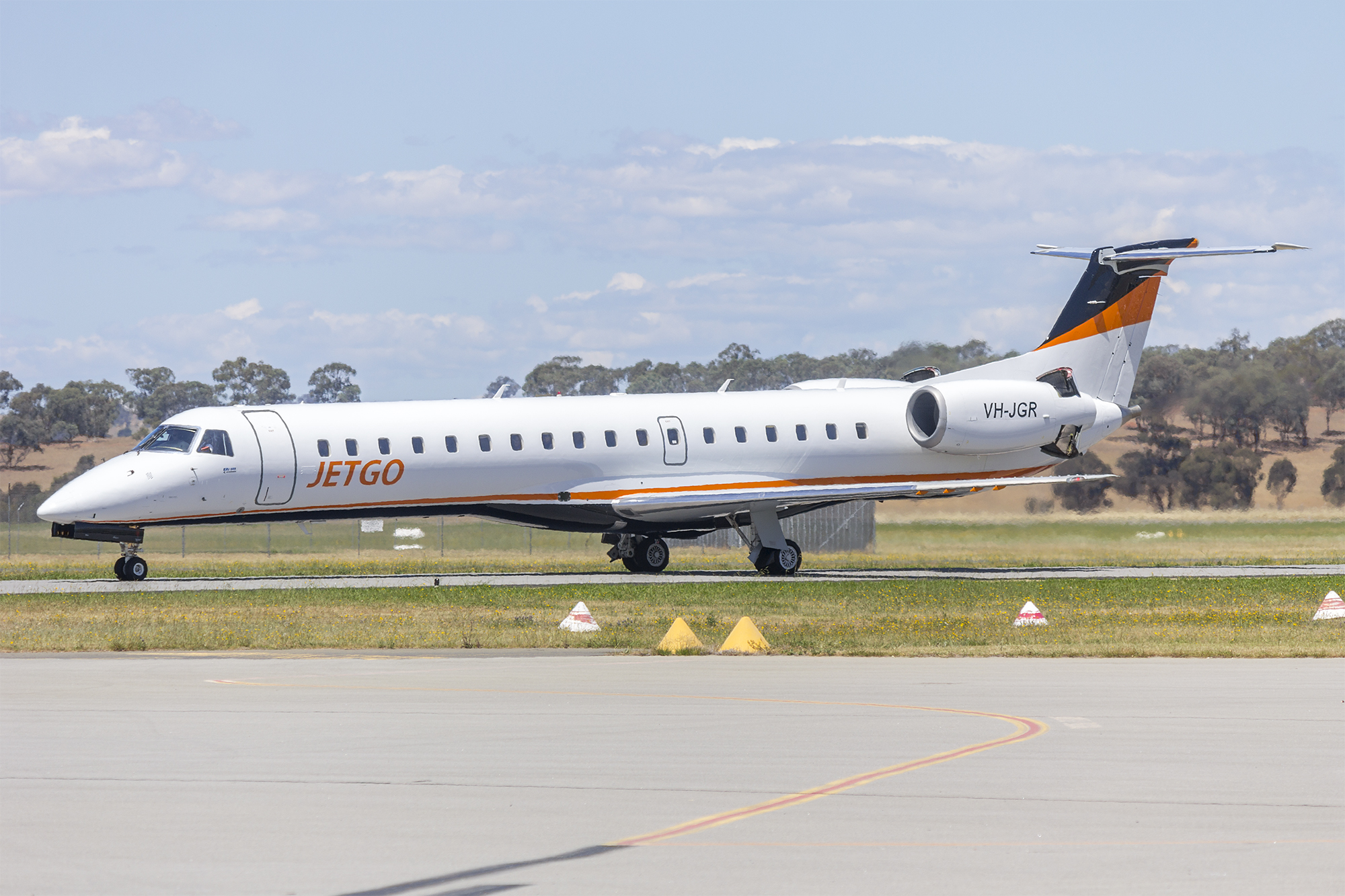
Embraer ERJ 145LR at Wagga Wagga Airport

As of 1 June 2018, the JetGo fleet consisted of the following aircraft:

JetGo fleet
Aircraft	In service	Orders	Passengers
Embraer ERJ 135LR	3	0	37
Embraer ERJ 140LR	2	0	44
Embraer ERJ 145LR	1		50
Total	6	2	
