= BVW =

BVW may refer to:

- Batavia Downs Airport, Queensland, Australia
- Boga language

== See also ==
- BWV (disambiguation)
- Bvdub, American electronic music producer
