= Arrabury Airport =

- IATA: AAB; ICAO: YARY

Summary
- Airport type: Public
- Location: Tanbar, Shire of Barcoo, Queensland, Australia
- Elevation AMSL: 334 ft / 102 m
- Coordinates: 26°41′24″S 141°02′48″E

Map
- Location in Queensland

Runways
Direction	Length		Surface
Direction	m	ft	Surface
16/34	1,144	3,753	Dirt
- Sources: AIP

Arrabury Airport (IATA: AAB, ICAO: YARY) is an airport at Arrabury pastoral station in Tanbar, Shire of Barcoo, Queensland, Australia.

== See also ==
- List of airports in Queensland
