= KSV =

KSV or kSv may refer to:

- Kaposi's sarcoma-associated herpesvirus, a virus
- Karlsruher SV Rugby, a German club
- Karyakshama Seva Vibhushanaya (Efficient Service Decoration), a Sri Lanka military medal
- Kieler Sportvereinigung Holstein, or Holstein Kiel, a football club in Kiel, Schleswig-Holstein, Germany
- Kilosievert, a unit of radiation
- Springvale Airport (Queensland), IATA airport code "KSV"
