= ABHS =

ABHS may refer to:

== Organisations ==
- American Baptist Historical Society, the oldest Baptist historical society in the US

== Schools ==
- Archbishop Blenk High School, Gretna, Louisiana, US (New Orleans area)
- Alma Bryant High School, Irvington, Alabama, US (Mobile, Alabama area)
- Amy Biehl High School, Albuquerque, New Mexico, US
- Anchor Bay High School, Fair Haven, Michigan, US
- Arkansas Baptist High School, Little Rock, Arkansas, US
- Ashfield Boys High School, Ashfield, New South Wales, Australia
- Ashfield Boys' High School, Belfast, Northern Ireland
- Asquith Boys High School, Asquith, New South Wales, Australia

== See also ==
- ABH (disambiguation)
