= List of airports in Queensland =

This is a list of airports in the Australian state of Queensland.

== List of airports ==
The list is sorted by the name of the community served, click the sort buttons in the table header to switch listing order. Airports named in bold are Designated International Airports, even if they have limited or no scheduled international services.

Community	Airport	Type	ICAO	IATA	Coordinates
Abingdon Downs	Abingdon Airport	Public	YABI	ABG	17°36′27″S 143°11′01″E
Mapoon	Agnew Airport	Public		AGW	12°08′44″S 142°08′57″E
Alpha	Alpha Airport	Public	YAPH	ABH	23°38′48″S 146°35′00″E
Aramac	Aramac Airport	Public	YAMC	AXC	22°58′00″S 145°14′30″E
Archerfield, Brisbane	Archerfield Airport	Public	YBAF		27°34′13″S 153°00′29″E
Arrabury	Arrabury Airport	Public	YARY	AAB	26°41′36″S 141°02′48″E
Aurukun	Aurukun Airport	Public	YAUR	AUU	13°21′14″S 141°43′15″E
Badu Island	Badu Island Airport	Private	YBAU	BDD	10°09′00″S 142°10′30″E
Ballera gas plant	Ballera Airport	Private	YLLE	BBL	27°24′30″S 141°48′30″E
Bamaga	Northern Peninsula Airport	Public	YNPE	ABM	10°57′03″S 142°27′34″E
Batavia Downs	Batavia Downs Airport	Public	YBTV	BVW	12°38′13″S 143°02′29″E
Barcaldine	Barcaldine Airport	Public	YBAR	BCI	23°33′55″S 145°18′24″E
Bedourie	Bedourie Airport	Public	YBIE	BEU	24°20′46″S 139°27′36″E
Bilinga, Gold Coast	**Gold Coast Airport**	Public	YBCG	OOL	28°09′54″S 153°30′18″E
Biloela	Thangool Airport	Public	YTNG	THG	24°29′38″S 150°34′44″E
Birdsville	Birdsville Airport	Public	YBDV	BVI	25°53′51″S 139°20′51″E
Blackall	Blackall Airport	Public	YBCK	BKQ	24°25′40″S 145°25′43″E
Blackwater	Blackwater Airport	Public	YBTR	BLT	23°36′11″S 148°48′25″E
Bluewater, Townsville	Bluewater Airport	Private	YBLP	BLP	19°11′30″S 146°29′36″E
Boigu Island	Boigu Island Airport	Public	YBOI	GIC	09°14′S 142°13′E
Boulia	Boulia Airport	Public	YBOU	BQL	22°54′48″S 139°53′59″E
Bowen	Bowen Airport	Public	YBWN	ZBO	20°01′04″S 148°12′55″E
Cribb Island, Brisbane	**Brisbane Airport**	Public	YBBN	BNE	27°23′00″S 153°07′06″E
Bundaberg	Bundaberg Airport	Public	YBUD	BDB	24°54′14″S 152°19′07″E
Burketown	Burketown Airport	Public	YBKT	BUC	17°44′55″S 139°32′04″E
Cairns	**Cairns Airport**	Public	YBCS	CNS	16°53′12″S 145°45′18″E
Caloundra	Caloundra Airport	Public	YCDR	CUD	26°48′06″S 153°06′18″E
Camooweal	Camooweal Airport	Public	YCMW	CML	19°54′42″S 138°07′30″E
Century Mine	Century Mine Airport	Private	YCNY		18°45′12″S 138°42′24″E
Charleville	Charleville Airport	Public	YBCV	CTL	26°24′24″S 146°15′45″E
Charters Towers	Charters Towers Airport	Public	YCHT	CXT	20°02′36″S 146°16′24″E
Chillagoe	Chillagoe Airport	Public	YCGO	LLG	17°08′34″S 144°31′44″E
Chinchilla	Chinchilla Airport	Public	YCCA	CCL	26°46′10″S 150°37′00″E
Clermont	Clermont Airport	Public	YCMT	CMQ	22°46′24″S 147°37′12″E
Cloncurry	Cloncurry Airport	Public	YCCY	CNJ	20°40′07″S 140°30′16″E
Coconut Island	Coconut Island Airport	Private	YCCT	CNC	10°03′S 143°04′E
Coen	Coen Airport	Public	YCOE	CUQ	13°45′43″S 143°07′00″E
Cooktown	Cooktown Airport	Public	YCKN	CTN	15°26′41″S 145°11′04″E
Cunnamulla	Cunnamulla Airport	Public	YCMU	CMA	28°01′48″S 145°37′20″E
Dalby	Dalby Airport	Public	YDAY	DBY	
Darnley Island	Darnley Island Airport	Public	YDNI	NLF	09°34′42″S 143°46′48″E
Dirranbandi	Dirranbandi Airport	Public	YDBI	DRN	28°35′30″S 148°13′00″E
Doomadgee	Doomadgee Airport	Public	YDMG	DMD	17°56′24″S 138°49′18″E
Dunk Island	Dunk Island Airport	Public	YDKI	DKI	17°56′30″S 146°08′24″E
Dysart	Dysart Airport	Private	YDYS	DYA	22°37′20″S 148°21′50″E
Emerald	Emerald Airport	Public	YEML	EMD	23°34′03″S 148°10′45″E
Enoggera, Brisbane	Enoggera Barracks	Military	YENO		27°25′30″S 152°59′00″E
Garbutt, Townsville	**Townsville Airport**	Public	YBTL	TSV	19°15′12″S 146°45′54″E
Garbutt, Townsville	RAAF Base Townsville	Military	YBTL	TVL	19°15′12″S 146°45′54″E
Gayndah	Gayndah Airport	Public	YGAY	GAH	25°36′55″S 151°37′15″E
Georgetown	Georgetown Airport	Public	YGTN	GTT	18°18′12″S 143°31′54″E
Gladstone	Gladstone Airport	Public	YGLA	GLT	23°52′11″S 151°13′22″E
Goondiwindi	Goondiwindi Airport	Public	YGDI	GOO	28°31′17″S 150°19′13″E
Gympie	Gympie Airport	Public	YGYM	GYP	26°17′00″S 152°42′06″E
Hamilton Island	Hamilton Island Airport	Public	YBHM	HTI	20°21′29″S 148°57′06″E
Hervey Bay	Hervey Bay Airport	Public	YHBA	HVB	25°19′08″S 152°52′49″E
Horn Island	**Horn Island Airport**	Public	YHID	HID	10°35′11″S 142°17′24″E
Hughenden	Hughenden Airport	Public	YHUG	HGD	20°48′54″S 144°13′30″E
Innisfail	Innisfail Airport	Public	YIFL	IFL	17°33′31″S 146°00′42″E
Ipswich	RAAF Base Amberley	Military	YAMB		27°38′26″S 152°42′43″E
Julia Creek	Julia Creek Airport	Public	YJLC	JCK	20°40′06″S 141°43′21″E
Karumba	Karumba Airport	Public	YKMB	KRB	17°27′18″S 140°49′54″E
Kingaroy	Kingaroy Airport	Public	YKRY	KGY	26°34′48″S 151°50′30″E
Kowanyama	Kowanyama Airport	Public	YKOW	HWM	15°29′08″S 141°45′05″E
Kubin	Kubin Airport	Public	YKUB	KUG	10°13′30″S 142°13′24″E
Lizard Island National Park	Lizard Island Airport	Public	YLZI	LZR	14°40′24″S 145°27′18″E
Lockhart River	Lockhart River Airport	Public	YLHR	IRG	12°47′13″S 143°18′17″E
Longreach	Longreach Airport	Public	YLRE	LRE	23°26′03″S 144°16′49″E
Mabuiag Island	Mabuiag Island Airport	Public	YMAA	UBB	09°57′06″S 142°11′48″E
Mackay	Mackay Airport	Public	YBMK	MKY	21°10′18″S 149°10′47″E
Marcoola, Sunshine Coast	**Sunshine Coast Airport**	Public	YBSU	MCY	26°36′12″S 153°05′30″E
Mareeba	Mareeba Airfield	Public	YMBA	MRG	17°04′09″S 145°25′09″E
Maryborough	Maryborough Airport	Public	YMYB	MBH	25°30′48″S 152°42′54″E
Middlemount	Middlemount Airport	Private	YMMU	MMM	22°48′12″S 148°42′18″E
Moranbah	Moranbah Airport	Private	YMRB	MOV	22°03′28″S 148°04′39″E
Mornington Island	Mornington Island Airport	Public	YMTI	ONG	16°39′45″S 139°10′41″E
Mount Gordon	Mount Gordon Airport	Private	YGON		19°46′30″S 139°24′24″E
Mount Isa	Mount Isa Airport	Public	YBMA	ISA	20°39′50″S 139°29′19″E
Murray Island	Murray Island Airport	Public	YMUI	MYI	09°54′53″S 144°03′15″E
Muttaburra	Muttaburra Airport	Public	YMTB	UTB	22°34′59″S 144°31′43″E
Nanango	Nanango Airport	Public			
National Highway A2	Elrose Airport	Private	YESE		20°58′36″S 141°00′24″E
Noosaville	Noosa Airport	Private	YNSH	NSA	26°25′24″S 153°03′55″E
Normanton	Normanton Airport	Public	YNTN	NTN	17°41′06″S 141°04′12″E
Oakey	Oakey Army Aviation Centre	Military	YBOK	OKY	27°24′41″S 151°44′07″E
Osborne Mine	Osborne Mine Airport	Private	YOSB		22°04′54″S 140°33′24″E
Palm Island	Palm Island Airport	Public	YPAM	PMK	18°45′19″S 146°34′53″E
Pormpuraaw	Edward River Airport	Public	YPMP	EDR	14°53′48″S 141°36′34″E
Proserpine	Whitsunday Coast Airport	Public	YBPN	PPP	20°29′42″S 148°33′06″E
Quilpie	Quilpie Airport	Public	YQLP	ULP	26°36′31″S 144°15′26″E
Richmond	Richmond Airport	Public	YRMD	RCM	20°42′07″S 143°06′53″E
Rockhampton	**Rockhampton Airport**	Public	YBRK	ROK	23°22′54″S 150°28′30″E
Roma	Roma Airport	Public	YROM	RMA	26°32′42″S 148°46′29″E
Rothwell	Redcliffe Airport	Public	YRED		27°12′24″S 153°04′06″E
Saibai Island	Saibai Island Airport	Private	YSII	SBR	09°22′42″S 142°37′30″E
Shoalwater Bay, Rockhampton	Williamson Airfield	Military	YWIS		22°28′24″S 150°10′42″E
Shute Harbour	Whitsunday Airport	Private	YSHR	JHQ	20°16′42″S 148°45′18″E
Southport	Southport Airport	Private	YSPT	SHQ	27°55′18″S 153°22′18″E
Springsure	Springsure Airport	Private	YSPI		24°07′54″S 148°05′06″E
Springvale	Springvale Airport	Public	YSPV	KSV	23°32′35″S 140°42′12″E
St George	St George Airport	Public	YSGE	SGO	28°03′00″S 148°35′42″E
Stanthorpe	Stanthorpe Airport	Public	YSPE		28°37′13″S 151°29′26″E
Sue Islet	Warraber Island Airport	Private	YWBS	SYU	10°12′24″S 142°49′24″E
Taroom	Taroom Airport	Public	YTAM	XTO	25°48′07″S 149°54′48″E
Thargomindah	Thargomindah Airport	Public	YTGM	XTG	27°59′11″S 143°48′39″E
The Monument	The Monument Airport	Private	YTMO		21°48′42″S 139°55′24″E
Toowoomba	Toowoomba City Aerodrome	Public	YTWB	TWB	27°32′29″S 151°54′45″E
Trepell	Trepell Airport	Private	YTEE		21°50′06″S 140°53′17″E
Warwick	Warwick Airport	Public	YWCK		28°08′58″S 151°56′35″E
Weipa	RAAF Scherger	Military	YBSG		12°37′24″S 142°05′12″E
Weipa	Weipa Airport	Public	YBWP	WEI	12°40′43″S 141°55′31″E
Windorah	Windorah Airport	Public	YWDH	WNR	25°24′48″S 142°40′00″E
Winton	Winton Airport	Public	YWTN	WIN	22°21′48″S 143°05′06″E
Woodstock	Donnington Airpark	Public	YDOP		19°36′48″S 146°50′30″E
Yam Island	Yam Island Airport	Private	YYMI	XMY	09°53′09″S 142°46′18″E
Yorke Island	Yorke Island Airport	Private	YYKI	OKR	09°45′12″S 143°24′16″E
Wellcamp	**Toowoomba Wellcamp Airport**	Public	YBWW	WTB	27°33′30″S 151°47′36″E

== Defunct airports ==
Community	Airport name	Type	ICAO	IATA	Coordinates
Antil Plains	Antil Plains Aerodrome	Military			19°26′36″S 146°49′29″E
Eagle Farm, Brisbane	Eagle Farm Airport	Military/Public			27°25′30″S 153°05′03″E
Charters Towers	Breddan Aerodrome	Military			19°56′34″S 146°14′21″E
Petrie, Brisbane	Petrie Airfield	Military			27°17′S 153°00′E
Tarampa	Tarampa Airfield	Military			27°27′19″S 152°28′56″E
Townsville	Aitkenvale Aerodrome	Military			19°18′45″S 146°44′23″E
Townsville	Bohle River Aerodrome	Military			19°16′58″S 146°41′57″E
Townsville	Reid River Airfield	Military			19°45′45″S 146°50′40″E

== See also ==
- List of airports in Australia
