= BWB =

BWB may stand for:

- Braille Without Borders, an international organisation to develop and teach not yet existent Braille scripts for languages in developing countries
- Burners Without Borders
- BWB (band), short for "Brown-Whalum-Braun"
- Blackwater Bossing, basketball team

== Media and entertainment ==
- Better World Books, an online bookseller
- Binging with Babish, a YouTube cooking channel created by American filmmaker Andrew Rea
- Bridget Williams Books, a New Zealand book publisher known as "BWB Books"

== Transport ==
- Barrow Island Airport, IATA airport code "BWB"
- Blended Wing Body, a form of aircraft in which the body and wing are not distinct
- Bow Brickhill railway station, Milton Keynes, England; National Rail station code BWB
- British Waterways Board, a navigation authority in England, Scotland and Wales from 1962 to 2012

== See also ==
- BWV (disambiguation)
