= Barcaldine =

Barcaldine may refer to:

== Australia ==
- Barcaldine, Queensland, Australia
  - Barcaldine Airport, Queensland Australia
- Barcaldine Region, a local government area in Queensland, Australia
  - Shire of Barcaldine, a former local government area in Queensland, Australia

== United Kingdom ==
- Barcaldine (horse), a British Thoroughbred racehorse
- Barcaldine, Argyll, Scotland, United Kingdom
