= Southport Airport =

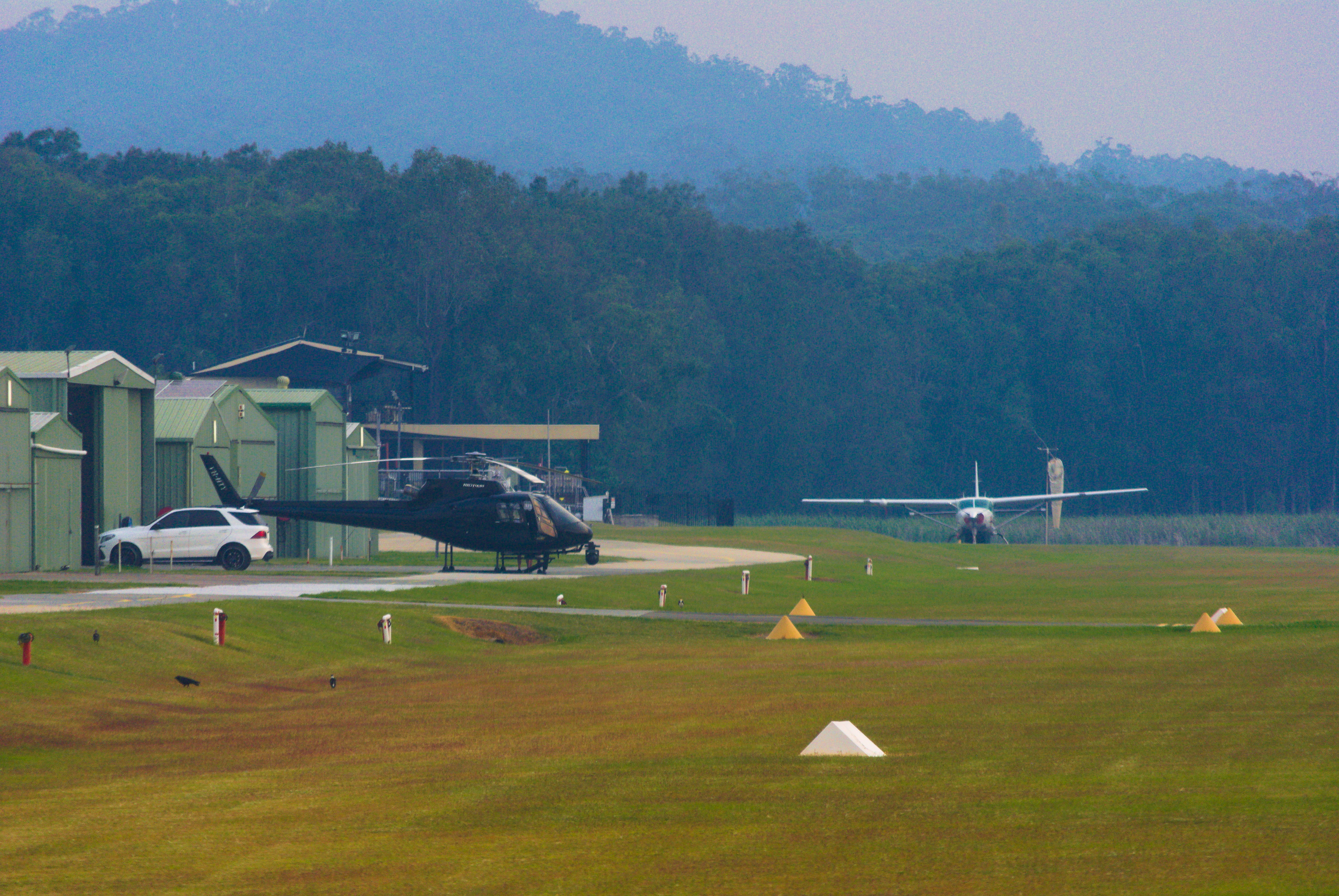
- IATA: SHQ; ICAO: YSPT

Summary
- Airport type: Private
- Operator: Southport Flying Club
- Serves: Southport, Queensland, Australia
- Elevation AMSL: 5 ft / 2 m
- Coordinates: 27°55′18″S 153°22′18″E

Map
- Location in Queensland

Runways
Direction	Length		Surface
Direction	m	ft	Surface
01/19	778	2,552	Natural
- Sources: AIP

Southport Airport (IATA: SHQ, ICAO: YSPT) is an airport located 3.5 nautical miles (6.5 km; 4.0 mi) northwest of Southport, in Coombabah, Queensland, Australia. It is operated by the Southport Flying Club.

== Facilities ==
This is a private airport, and permission is required to land.

The airport is at an elevation of 5 ft (2 m) above sea level. It has one runway measuring 778 metres. Both ends of the runway have displaced thresholds due to trees. Runway 01 has a displaced threshold of 190 metres and Runway 19 has a displaced threshold of 140M. As it is an uncontrolled aerodrome, pilots are required to coordinate arrivals and departures over a Common Traffic Advisory Frequency.

The displaced threshold lengths are:

- RWY 01 is 655 m (2,149 ft) in length.
- RWY 19 is 633 m (2,077 ft) in length.

== Gallery ==
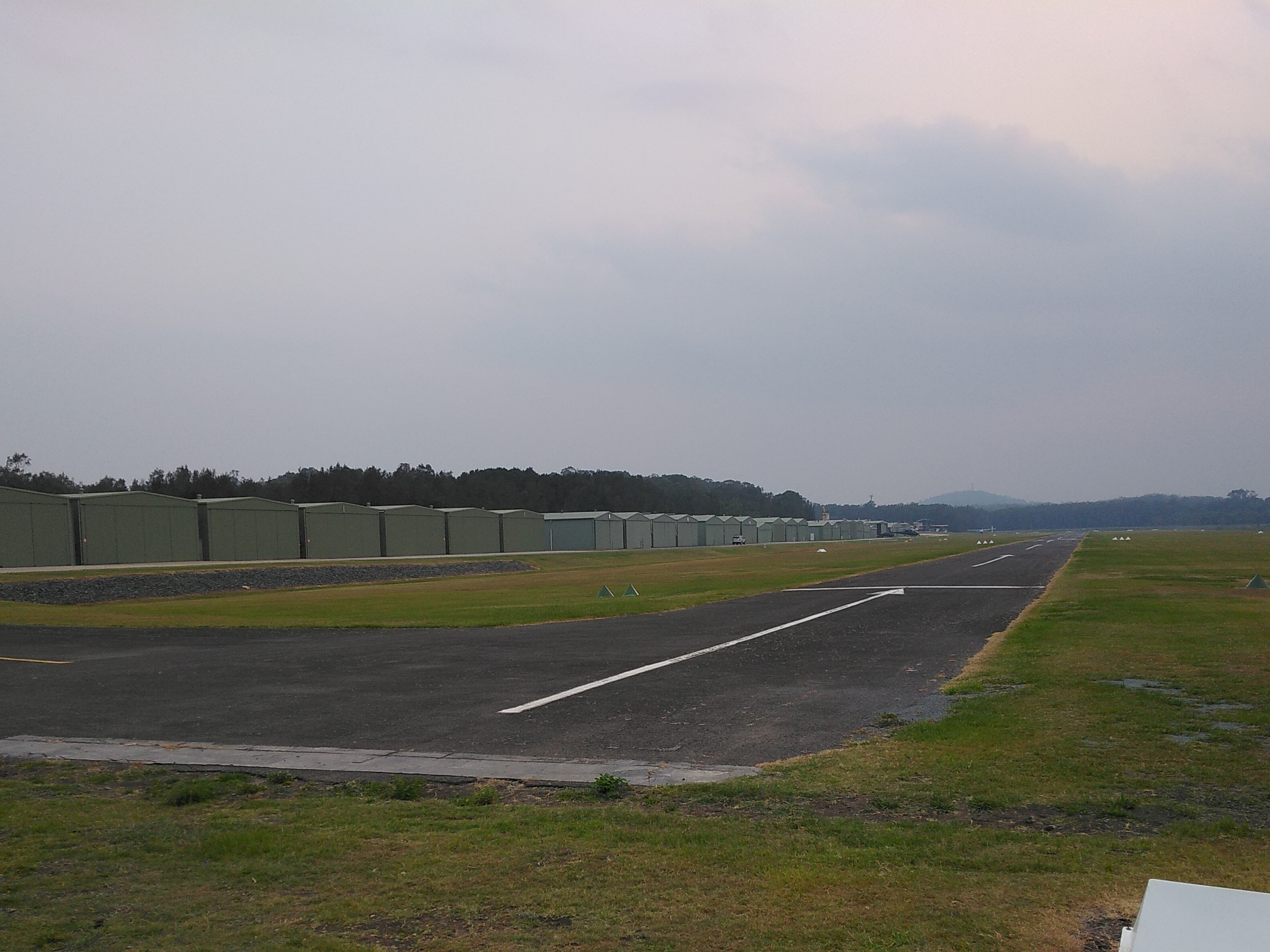
Runway

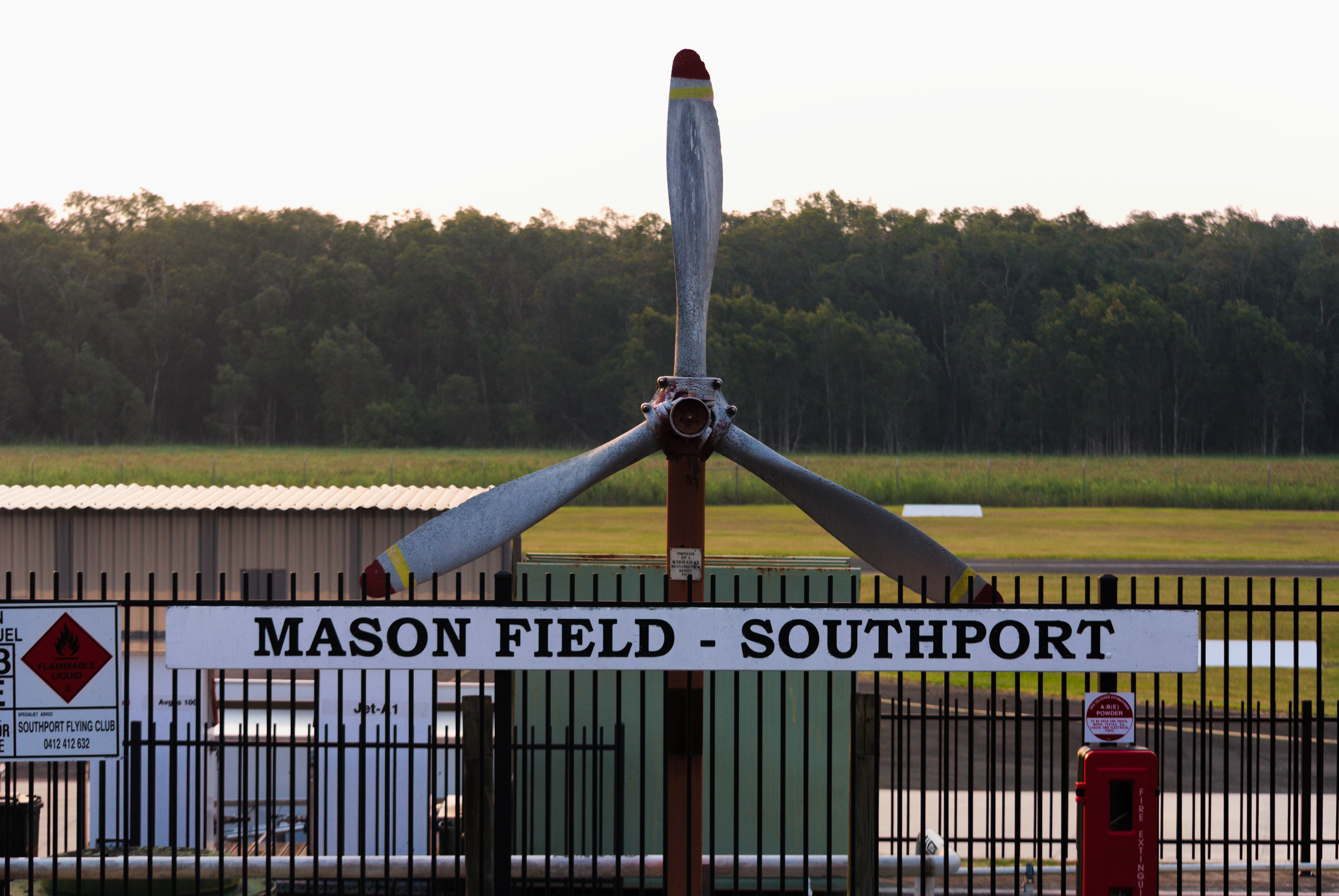
Mason Field – Southport

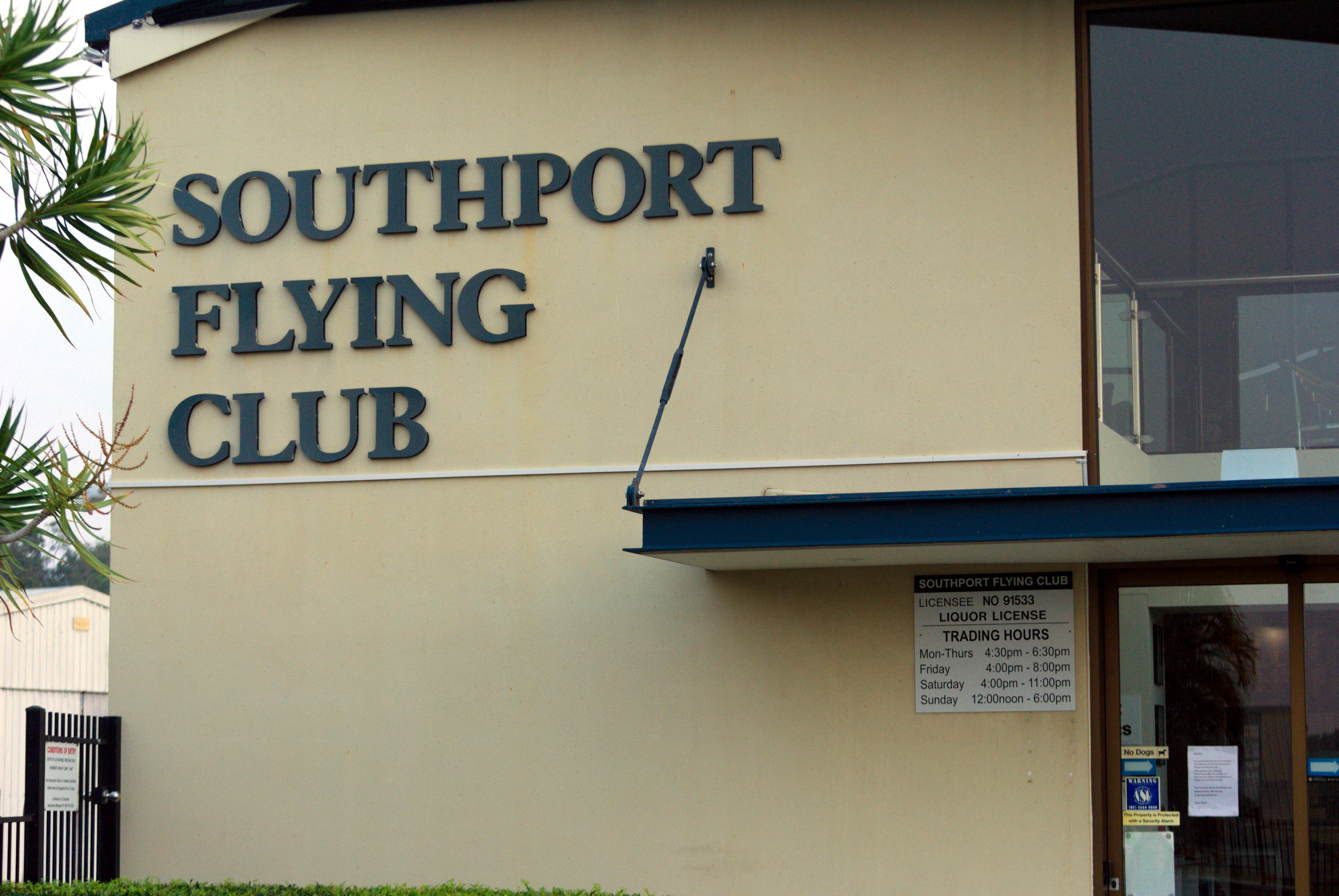
Southport Flying Club

== See also ==
- List of airports in Queensland
