= Cooktown Airport =

- IATA: CTN; ICAO: YCKN

Summary
- Airport type: Public
- Owner/Operator: Cook Shire Council
- Serves: Cooktown, Queensland, Australia
- Elevation AMSL: 26 ft / 8 m
- Coordinates: 15°26′41″S 145°11′04″E

Map
- Location in Queensland

Runways
| Direction | Length | | Surface |
| Direction | m | ft | Surface |
|---|---|---|---|
| 11/29 | 1,627 | 5,338 | Asphalt |
- Sources: Australian AIP and aerodrome chart

Cooktown Airport (IATA: CTN, ICAO: YCKN) is an airport in Cooktown, Queensland, Australia and is the gateway to Cape York Peninsula. The airport is 7.5 km (4.7 mi) from the town centre.

== Airlines and destinations ==
| Airlines | Destinations |
|---|---|
| Hinterland Aviation | Cairns |

== See also ==
- List of airports in Queensland
