= ABH =

ABH, or abh, may refer to:

== Transport infrastructure ==
- Alpha Airport in Queensland, Australia (IATA airport code ABH)
- Abererch railway station, Wales, UK (National Rail code "ABH")

== Other uses ==
- Abh, a Latin-script trigraph used in Irish to write the sound /əu̯/, or in Donegal, /oː/, between broad consonants
- Central Asian Arabic language (ISO 639-3 code "abh")
- Assault occasioning actual bodily harm, an offence in English law
- Aviation boatswain's mate, handling, a US Navy occupational rating
- A Barbadian's Head on the flag of pirate Bartholomew Roberts
