= Chillagoe Airport =

- IATA: LLG; ICAO: YCGO

Summary
- Airport type: Public
- Operator: Tablelands Regional Council
- Location: Chillagoe, Queensland, Australia
- Elevation AMSL: 1,123 ft / 342 m
- Coordinates: 17°08′14.3″S 144°31′42.9″E

Map
- Location in Queensland

Runways
| Direction | Length | | Surface |
| Direction | m | ft | Surface |
|---|---|---|---|
| 17/35 | 981 | 3,219 | Asphalt |
- Sources: Australian AIP and aerodrome chart

Chillagoe Airport (IATA: LLG, ICAO: YCGO) is an airport located 1.3 nautical miles (2.4 km; 1.5 mi) north of Chillagoe, Queensland, Australia.

== See also ==
- List of airports in Queensland
