= Mount Gordon Airport =

- IATA: GPD; ICAO: YGON

Summary
- Airport type: Private
- Operator: 29Metals Pty Ltd
- Location: Gunpowder Mine, Queensland, Australia
- Elevation AMSL: 900 ft / 274 m
- Coordinates: 19°46′21″S 139°24′16″E

Map
- Location in Queensland

Runways
Direction	Length		Surface
Direction	m	ft	Surface
08/26	1,170	3,839	Asphalt
- Sources: Australian AIP

Mount Gordon Airport (IATA: GPD, ICAO: YGON) is serving the Gunpowder Mine, Queensland, Australia.

== See also ==
- List of airports in Queensland
