= Warwick Airport (Queensland) =

Airport in Queensland, Australia

Queensland Airport
- IATA: WAZ; ICAO: YWCK

Summary
- Airport type: Southern Downs Regional Council
- Location: Warwick, Queensland
- Elevation AMSL: 1,526 ft / 465 m
- Coordinates: 28°08′58″S 151°56′35″E

Map
- Location in Queensland

Runways
Direction	Length		Surface
Direction	m	ft	Surface
09/27	1,640	5,381
- Sources: Australian AIP and aerodrome chart

Warwick Airport (IATA: WAZ, ICAO: YWCK) is located at Warwick, Queensland, Australia.

== Australian Air Force Cadets ==
No. 2 Wing Australian Air Force Cadets operates their glider training from this airport.

In the surroundings around Warwick Airport, mainly savannah forest grows. Around Warwick Airport, it is very sparsely populated, with 3 inhabitants per square kilometre. Average annual rainfall is 954 millimeters. The rainiest month is January, with an average of 190 mm of precipitation, and the driest is August, with 27 mm of precipitation.

== See also ==
- List of airports in Queensland
