= Bluewater Airport =

- IATA: none; ICAO: YBLP

Summary
- Airport type: Private
- Location: Bluewater Park, Queensland
- Elevation AMSL: 116 ft / 35 m
- Coordinates: 19°11′15″S 146°29′40″E

Map
- Location in Queensland

Runways
Direction	Length		Surface
Direction	m	ft	Surface
02/20	1,515	4,970	Asphalt

Bluewater Airport (IATA: YBLP) is an aircraft landing area in Bluewater Park, Queensland.

In April 2015, a proposal was made to expand Bluewater Airport for freight and training purposes. However, in March 2016, plans to expand had been stalled due to a pending investigation into heavy aircraft landing at the airport.

== See also ==
- List of airports in Queensland
