= Gayndah Airport =

Gayndah Airport Ted Kirk Field
- IATA: GAH; ICAO: YGAY

Summary
- Airport type: Public
- Operator: North Burnett Regional Council
- Location: Gayndah, Queensland, Australia
- Elevation AMSL: 369 ft (112 m)
- Coordinates: 25°36′56″S 151°37′16″E

Map
- Location in Queensland

Runways
Direction	Length		Surface
Direction	m	ft	Surface
06/24	1,265	4,150	Asphalt
- Sources: Australian AIP and aerodrome chart

Gayndah Airport, also known as Ted Kirk Airfield (ICAO: YGAY) is located near Gayndah, Queensland, Australia. The facility primarily serves general aviation and emergency services.

== History ==
An airfield was first proposed for Gayndah in 1929, when the Shire council considered the conversion of the local racecourse into a landing ground. A dedicated aerodrome opened in 1937, with the arrival of a de Havilland Dragon Rapide on 8 August becoming the first aircraft to land there.

By 1939, it was apparent the aerodrome, which shared a leased site with farm buildings, needed considerable improvement to attract regular commercial service. By 1950, works to upgrade the site allowed the aerodrome to be provisionally licenced by the Department of Civil Aviation. A request by the Shire of Gayndah to the Federal Government to take over operation and maintenance of the facility was declined in 1952. The Commonwealth instead offered an annual maintenance grant of up to £120, until demand for passenger services eventuated.

In 2013, the development of a disaster management hub was proposed to be built at the airport, which is the only one in the North Burnett Region that is above seasonal flood levels. The facility, completed in 2016, supports operations by the Queensland Fire and Emergency Services and Royal Flying Doctor Service.

The airport closed in October 2015 to allow major renovations to support operations by emergency services, with the addition of fuel facilities. It reopened in June 2016 after work was completed, including the reconstruction of the runway to strengthen and widen the pavement. At a ceremony in November, the airport was officially renamed to honour Ted Kirk, a Royal Australian Air Force fighter pilot during World War II, who would go on to serve on the Gayndah council from 1961 to 1994.

== See also ==
- List of airports in Queensland
