= Georgetown Airport (Queensland) =

Airport in Australia

- IATA: GTT; ICAO: YGTN

Summary
- Airport type: Public
- Operator: Etheridge Shire Council
- Location: Georgetown, Queensland
- Elevation AMSL: 995 ft / 303 m
- Coordinates: 18°18′09″S 143°31′53″E

Map
- Location in Queensland

Runways
Direction	Length		Surface
Direction	m	ft	Surface
06/24	1,158	3,799
- Sources: Australian AIP and aerodrome chart

Georgetown Airport (IATA: GTT, ICAO: YGTN) is located 1 nautical mile (1.9 km; 1.2 mi) southwest of Georgetown, Queensland, Australia.

== See also ==
- List of airports in Queensland
