= Agnew Airport =

Airport in Queensland, Australia

- IATA: AGW; ICAO: none

Summary
- Location: Mapoon, Queensland, Australia
- Elevation AMSL: 160 ft / 49 m
- Coordinates: 12°08′44″S 142°08′57″E

Map
- Location of airport in Queensland

Runways
Direction	Length		Surface
Direction	m	ft	Surface
n/a	1,372	4,501	n/a

Agnew Airport (IATA: AGW) is an airport in Mapoon, Shire of Cook, Queensland, Australia. It presumably takes its name from the parish.

== Facilities ==
The airport has one runway which is 1,372 metres (4,501 ft) in length.

== See also ==
- List of airports in Queensland
