= Gladstone Airport =

Airport in Queensland, Australia

- IATA: GLT; ICAO: YGLA

Summary
- Airport type: Public
- Owner/Operator: Gladstone Regional Council
- Serves: Gladstone, Queensland, Australia
- Elevation AMSL: 59 ft (18 m)
- Coordinates: 23°52′11″S 151°13′22″E
- Website: https://gladstoneairport.com.au/

Map
- Location in Queensland

Runways
Direction	Length		Surface
Direction	m	ft	Surface
10/28	1,920	6,299	Asphalt

Statistics (2024-25)
- Revenue passengers: 221,503
- Aircraft movements: 3,799
- Sources: Australian AIP and aerodrome chart BITRE

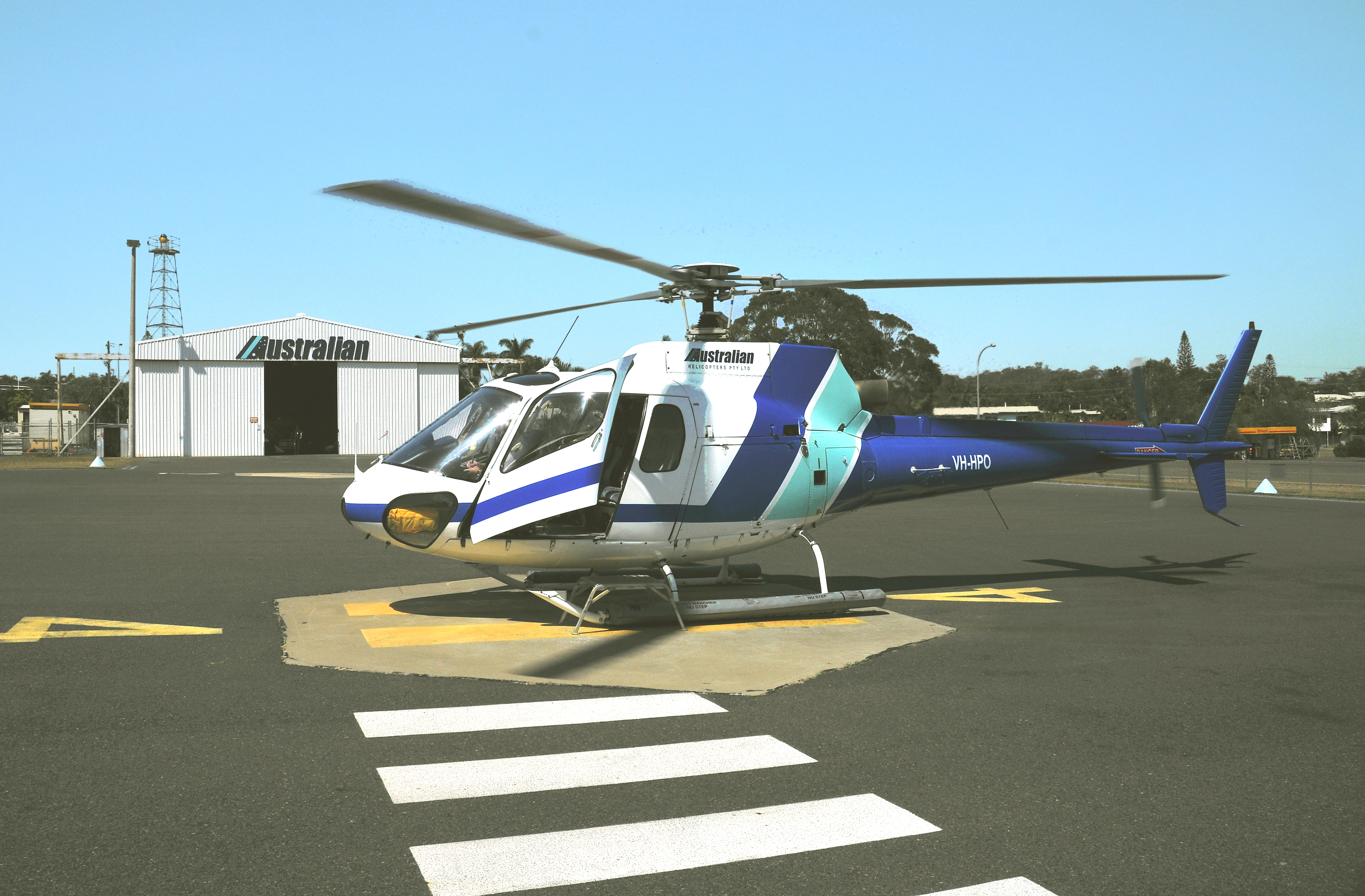
Helicopter at Gladstone Airport in Queensland, Australia.

Gladstone Airport (IATA: GLT, ICAO: YGLA) is an airport serving the city of Gladstone, in Queensland, Australia. It is located in the suburb of Clinton, about 10 km (6.2 mi) by from the town's centre. The airport is owned and operated by the Gladstone Regional Council and offers scheduled flights to Brisbane Airport.

== History ==
An airstrip was cleared from scrubland close to Gladstone by Thiess Brothers for the operation of company aircraft in 1952. The local council, interested in using the strip to attract air services to the town, submitted plans to the Department of Civil Aviation to extend the runway to allow operation of Douglas DC-3 airliners. On 7 July, a DC-3 of Queensland Airlines operating a flight between Rockhampton and Brisbane made an intermediate stop at Gladstone with officials on board to survey the airfield.

Funding for development of the site into a commercial airport was approved in 1954, with the facility to open in 1955. Queensland Airlines announced they would serve the town's new airport. By 1965, the airport handled 13,000 annual passengers. Following the acquisition of Queensland Airlines by Ansett, the federal government granted Trans Australia Airlines permission to launch competing services to the airport, which commenced on 5 December 1966.

During the mid-1980s, Sunstate Airlines served the Brisbane to Gladstone route using a combination of Short 330 and Short 360s. The airport provided a hub for tourism, with flights meeting Lloyd Helicopters connections to the Heron Island resort.

The Gladstone council took control of the airport following the dissolution of the Gladstone-Calliope Aerodrome Board on 15 March 2007 as part of local government reforms across Queensland.

=== 2010s resources boom ===
By 2008, Qantaslink was the sole airline regularly serving Gladstone, using Dash 8 aircraft with seating from 50 to 74 passengers for flights to Brisbane. A small number of these flights operated onwards to Rockhampton, Mackay, Townsville and Cairns. The same year, the Gladstone Regional Council commenced an upgrade of the airport. The $65 million project included strengthening and extending the runway from 1,600 m (5,200 ft) to 1,915 m (6,283 ft), allowing Boeing 737 and Airbus A320 jets to regularly use the airport. The council announced that the airport would not shut down during the upgrade. Stage two of the works, approved in 2010 involved expansion of the terminal and upgraded security screening to provide additional capacity for rapid growth caused by a boom in the resources sector.

In April 2011 Strategic Airlines began double daily return flights from Brisbane Airport The service, which used A320 jets only lasted until August.

With the acquisition of ATR 72 aircraft, Virgin Australia commenced services to Brisbane on 17 October 2011. An additional service was added to the route from 16 January 2012, bringing the route to three times daily and frequencies were increased again in May 2012.

Qantas also invested significantly in Gladstone Airport during 2012, opening a Qantas Regional Lounge and increasing capacity on the Brisbane route through the introduction of Boeing 717 jets during peak times. The airline also announced eight direct flights per week between Gladstone and Sydney beginning in March 2013, operated by Qantaslink Bombardier Q400 aircraft.

An instrument landing system and distance measuring equipment were installed at the airport in 2013. These navigational aids were funded liquefied natural gas (LNG) producers, after concerns that the development of processing facilities on Curtis Island would cause thermal updrafts in the airport's approach corridors. In the 2013-14 financial year, the airport handled over 500,000 passengers and 10,702 regular public transport aircraft movements. As a result of the rapidly increasing airline traffic volume, Airservices Australia constructed an aircraft rescue and firefighting station at Gladstone airport in late 2014.

Following the cancellation of the Qantaslink service, regional airline JetGo launched double-daily Gladstone to Sydney flights as their inaugural route on 1 December 2014. The service was terminated in February 2015 with the carrier citing concerns about its financial viability.

=== Downturn, COVID-19 and recovery ===
As major construction projects in Gladstone wound down, the airport recorded a significant drop in traffic volumes, falling by more than 200,000 annual passengers between the 2013 and 2017 calendar years. Following the withdrawal of ATR 72s from Virgin Australia's Queensland routes in 2017 amid the downturn, Alliance Airlines took over the Brisbane to Gladstone services maintained service through a code share arrangement, using Fokker 70s.

The runway 10 instrument landing system that was installed in 2013 was decommissioned and removed in 2020, in part due to ongoing maintenance costs. The initial wave of the coronavirus pandemic saw further heavy service reductions to the airport in April 2020. Qantaslink retained a single weekly flight, while Alliance Airlines, maintained a reduced six-day per week schedule. Alliance Airlines services to Bundaberg, which had operated as an extension of the Virgin Australia codeshare arrangements ceased in September 2020, however additional frequency was added to Brisbane.

The short-lived low-cost carrier Bonza introduced direct flights between Gladstone and Melbourne, as well as the Gold Coast in 2023, however both services ceased with the airline's financial collapse in April 2024.

== Facilities ==
The airport resides at an elevation of 59 ft (18 m) above sea level. It has 4 parking stands using a state of the art double level parking bay design, able to hold from Q200s to 737s, it also has a large GA parking areas to the west of the main terminal. It has one runway designated 10/28 with an asphalt surface measuring 1,920 m × 45 m (6,299 ft × 148 ft), able to hold up to a Boeing 737 or an Airbus A320.

== Airlines and destinations ==
Airlines	Destinations
QantasLink	Brisbane
Virgin Australia	Brisbane

== Ground transport ==
Buses operate between the town centre and the airport, but are only operational from Monday to Friday between 6am and 6pm. Taxis are also available, as are rental cars.

== Statistics ==
Gladstone Airport was ranked 31st in Australia for the number of revenue passengers served in financial year 2024–25.

Annual passenger and aircraft statistics for Gladstone
Year	Revenue passengers	Aircraft movements
2014–15	443,730	9,586
2015–16	368,039(-17.0%)	7,836
2016–17	303,263(-17.6%)	6,148
2017–18	265,613(-12.4%)	4,904
2018–19	246,640(-7.1%)	4,807
2019–20	187,280(-24.0%)	3,982
2020–21	128,880(-31.2%)	3,211
2021–22	155,429(+20.6%)	3,401
2022–23	207,246(+33.3%)	4,134
2023–24	240,229(+15.9%)	4,245
2024–25	221,503(-7.8%)	3,799

== Accidents and incidents ==
- On 31 October 1969, a Sikorsky S-58B helicopter carrying 12 passengers including Melville Bell Grosvenor, editor of National Geographic and 2 crew crashed after the engine failed on takeoff at Gladstone Airport. The helicopter was operating a charter to Heron Island in the Great Barrier Reef. The aircraft caught fire during the evacuation resulting in injuries to several passengers, but all aboard survived.

== See also ==
- List of airports in Queensland
