= Roma Airport =

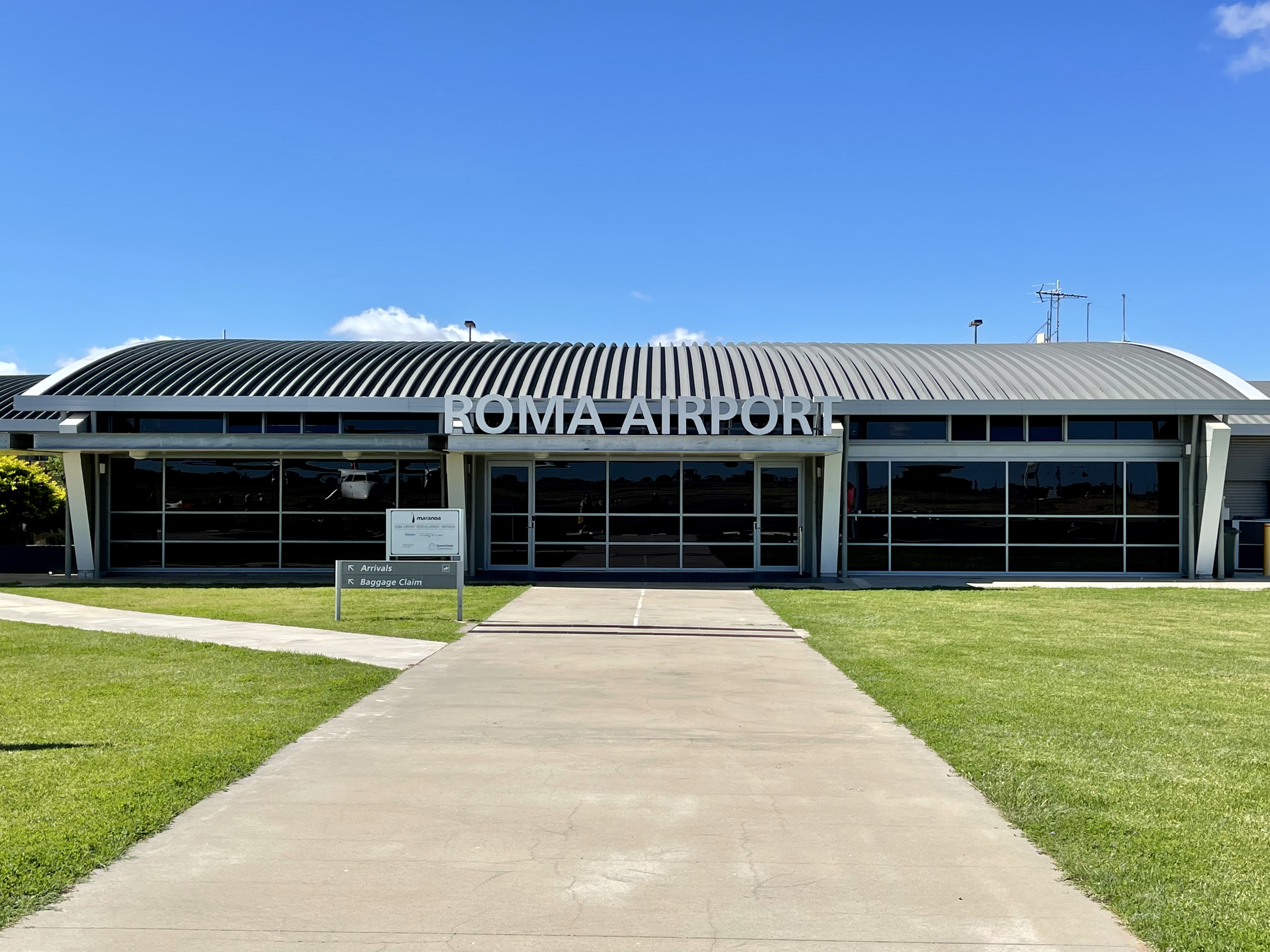
- The A.T. Berry Terminal at Roma Airport, 2021
- IATA: RMA; ICAO: YROM

Summary
- Airport type: Public
- Operator: Maranoa Regional Council
- Location: Roma, Queensland
- Elevation AMSL: 1,032 ft / 315 m
- Coordinates: 26°32′42″S 148°46′29″E

Map
- Location in Queensland

Runways
Direction	Length		Surface
Direction	m	ft	Surface
18/36	1,504	4,934	Asphalt
09/27	801	2,628	Grass

Statistics (FY 2013-14)
- Passengers: 243,901
- Aircraft movements: 6,377
- Sources: Australian AIP and aerodrome chart Passenger and aircraft movements from the BITRE.

Roma Airport (IATA: RMA, ICAO: YROM) is an airport located 2 nautical miles (3.7 km; 2.3 mi) northwest of Roma, Queensland, Australia. The airport underwent a major redevelopment completed in April 2012, replacing the original A.T. Berry Terminal with a larger, modern facility. Much of the $14 million project funded by energy and resources companies to support their operations in the area.

The Royal Flying Doctor Service has one of its nine Queensland bases at Roma Airport.

== History ==
The airport opened in 1949, replacing an earlier facility which had been operating since the 1920s located across town, south of the Western railway line. The town was one of the first served by Qantas, who inaugurated weekly services between Brisbane, Roma and Charleville in April 1929. With the move to the new site, the services increased to every weekday.

As there was no terminal facilities on the site, from the 1960s ground handling, check-in and bookings were conducted out of the back of a Ford Falcon utility by local man Alan Berry. On 27 April 1996 the mayor of Roma opened a new terminal facility, named the AT Berry Terminal in honour of Berry's dedication to aviation in the town.

The airport and terminal facilities were extensively upgraded in 2012, with the construction of a new terminal (also named the AT Berry Terminal) and enlarged apron. Within months of opening in April, by December the new terminal was already operating close to capacity, handling more than 179,000 passengers in the 2012–13 financial year. In 2013–14 the airport handled more than 254,000 passengers, ranking Roma as the 29th busiest airport in Australia. This growth represented an increase of 42.1% on the previous year and was the strongest growth recorded for any regional airport in Australia. Much of this passenger traffic is generated from closed fly-in fly-out (FIFO) charters for the resources industry involved in coal seam gas energy projects in the Surat Basin.

In October 2014, JetGo announced direct jet services to Sydney to begin in November as one of two destinations to launch the airline's expansion into scheduled public transport flights. After delaying starting the route until December, on 20 November the company announced that due to slow bookings and the slowing of the local resources industry that they were cancelling the planned services.

== Airlines and destinations ==
Airlines	Destinations
Alliance Airlines	Charter: Brisbane
Rex Airlines	Brisbane, Charleville

== Accidents and incidents ==
- On the evening of 28 September 1989, a Beechcraft Baron flying from Longreach to Roma failed to arrive at the airport. No distress call was received. A search and rescue operation located wreckage 19 km (12 mi) west of Roma, with the aircraft having descended into trees for unknown reasons. The five occupants were killed in the accident.
- On 25 March 2013 a similar accident occurred killing former bull riding world champion John Quintana and the CEO of livestock brokerage firm Ray White Rural when the Cessna 210 aircraft they were travelling in crashed shortly after takeoff from Roma prior to first light without broadcasting a distress call.

== See also ==
- List of airports in Queensland
