= Springvale Airport (Queensland) =

Airport in Queensland, Australia

- IATA: KSV; ICAO: YSPV

Summary
- Airport type: Public
- Location: Springvale, Queensland
- Coordinates: 23°32′35″S 140°42′12″E

Map
- Location in Queensland
- Source: DAFIF

Springvale Airport, Queensland (IATA: KSV, ICAO: YSPV) is an airport near Springvale, Queensland.

== See also ==
- List of airports in Queensland
