= Middlemount Airport =

Airport in Australia

- IATA: MMM; ICAO: YMMU

Summary
- Airport type: Private
- Operator: Anglo Coal (Capcoal Management) Pty Ltd
- Location: Middlemount, Queensland, Australia
- Elevation AMSL: 547 ft / 167 m
- Coordinates: 22°48′05″S 148°42′25″E

Map
- Location in Queensland

Runways
Direction	Length		Surface
Direction	m	ft	Surface
11/29	1,550	5,085	Asphalt
- Sources: Australian AIP

Middlemount Airport (IATA: MMM, ICAO: YMMU) is located at Middlemount, Queensland, Australia.

== Airlines and destinations ==
Airlines	Destinations
Hevilift Australia	Charter: Brisbane

== See also ==
- List of airports in Queensland
