= Alpha Airport =

Airport in Queensland, Australia

- IATA: ABH; ICAO: YAPH

Summary
- Airport type: Public
- Owner: Barcaldine Regional Council
- Serves: Alpha, Queensland, Australia
- Elevation AMSL: 1,255 ft / 383 m
- Coordinates: 23°38′48″S 146°35′00″E

Map
- Location in Queensland

Runways
Direction	Length		Surface
Direction	m	ft	Surface
18/36	1,456	4,777	Asphalt
- Sources: AIP

Alpha Airport (IATA: ABH, ICAO: YAPH) is located 2.5 nautical miles (4.6 km; 2.9 mi) west of the township of Alpha in Queensland, Australia.

== See also ==
- List of airports in Queensland
