= Hervey Bay Airport =

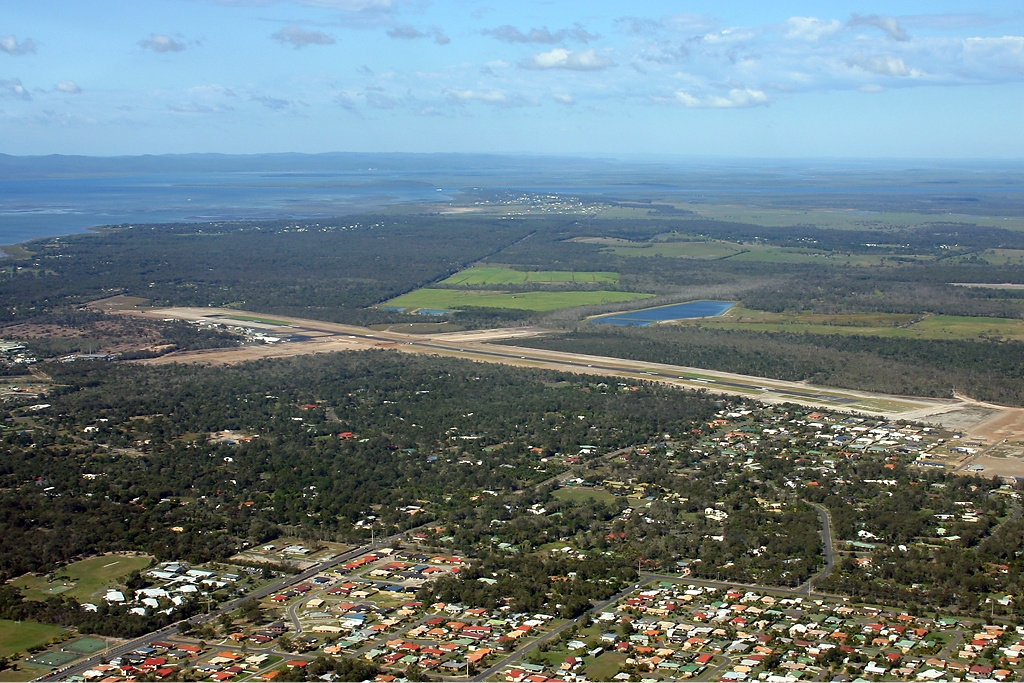
- IATA: HVB; ICAO: YHBA

Summary
- Airport type: Public
- Operator: Fraser Coast Regional Council
- Serves: Hervey Bay, Queensland, Australia
- Opened: 1963
- Elevation AMSL: 60 ft (18 m)
- Coordinates: 25°19′14″S 152°52′54″E
- Website: Official website

Map
- Location in Queensland

Runways
Direction	Length		Surface
Direction	m	ft	Surface
11/29	2,000	6,562	Asphalt

Statistics (2016–2017)
- Revenue passengers: 170,052
- Aircraft movements: 3,496
- Sources: Australian AIP and aerodrome chart BITRE

Hervey Bay Airport (IATA: HVB, ICAO: YHBA) is the main airport for the city of Hervey Bay, Queensland, Australia and the Fraser Coast region which incorporates the nearby city of Maryborough.

The airport is serviced by Jetstar flights from Sydney and Melbourne as well as Qantas flights from Brisbane.

== History ==
Hervey Bay Airport was established in 1963 for commercial aviation.

The airport, which is located in Urangan, 5 nautical miles (9.3 km; 5.8 mi) southeast of Pialba, re-opened in mid-2005, after the existing airfield underwent an $11.5 million upgrade which included the construction of a new terminal building and the extension of the existing 1,500 m (4,921 ft) runway to 2,000 m (6,562 ft) to accommodate jet services from Virgin Australia.

Up until September 2006, Sunshine Express Airlines provided daily services to the airport from Brisbane. The airline ceased all scheduled operations on 1 October 2006 after a proposed acquisition by Regional Express Airlines was terminated and an intention by QantasLink for the introduction of Brisbane services was announced.

In 2006, the airport was the fastest growing in Queensland with passenger numbers almost doubling.

In June 2017, Fraser Coast mayor Chris Loft and JetGo announced that the airline would commence two direct services per week from Hervey Bay Airport to Melbourne's Essendon Airport, as well as direct services to Brisbane. Due to have commenced on 21 July 2017, the service never commenced due to a lack of bookings. Direct services to and from Brisbane were also cancelled after JetGo entered voluntary administration later that year.

In November 2023, Fraser Coast mayor George Seymour and Jetstar announced that direct flights between Melbourne (Tullamarine) and Hervey Bay would commence in June 2024.

== Facilities ==
The airport resides at an elevation of 60 ft (18 m) above sea level. It has one runway designated 11/29 with an asphalt surface measuring 2,000 m × 30 m (6,562 ft × 98 ft).

== Airlines and destinations ==
Airlines	Destinations
Jetstar	Melbourne, Sydney
QantasLink	Brisbane

== Statistics ==
Hervey Bay Airport was ranked 39th in Australia for the number of revenue passengers served in financial year 2016–2017.

== Statistics ==
Annual passenger and aircraft statistics for Hervey Bay
Year	Revenue passengers	Aircraft movements
2000–2001	42,257	3,669
2001–2002	35,376	3,810
2002–2003	29,058	2,268
2003–2004	28,871	2,111
2004–2005	33,978	2,377
2005–2006	80,984	2,963
2006–2007	170,760	3,907
2007–2008	201,359	3,052
2008–2009	217,952	3,337
2009–2010	164,558	3,060
2010–2011	150,573	2,919
2011–2012	149,368	2,937
2012–2013	151,189	2,970
2013–2014	150,371	3,006
2014–2015	158,033	3,436
2015–2016	163,540	3,614
2016–2017	170,052	3,496

== See also ==
- List of airports in Queensland
