= Batavia Downs Airport =

- IATA: BVW; ICAO: YBTV

Summary
- Airport type: Public
- Location: Batavia Downs, Queensland
- Elevation AMSL: 300 ft / 91 m
- Coordinates: 12°39′33″S 142°40′29″E

Map
- Location in Queensland

Runways
Direction	Length		Surface
Direction	m	ft	Surface
07/25	1,000	3,281	Asphalt

Batavia Downs (IATA: BVW, ICAO: YBTV) is an airport in Batavia Downs.

== See also ==
- List of airports in Queensland
