= Winton Airport =

Airport in Queensland, Australia

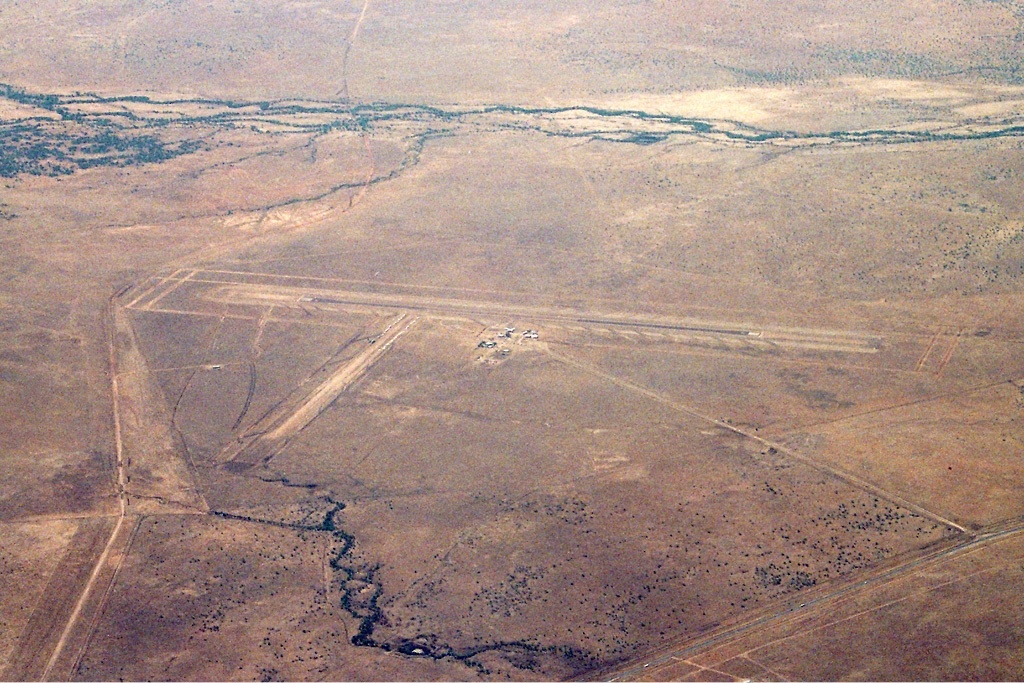
- IATA: WIN; ICAO: YWTN

Summary
- Airport type: Public
- Operator: Winton Shire Council
- Serves: Winton, Queensland, Australia
- Elevation AMSL: 638 ft / 194 m
- Coordinates: 22°21′48″S 143°05′06″E

Map
- Location in Queensland

Runways
Direction	Length		Surface
Direction	m	ft	Surface
14/32	1,402	4,600	Asphalt
05/23	890	2,920	Clay
- Sources: Australian AIP and aerodrome chart

Winton Airport (IATA: WIN, ICAO: YWTN) is an airport serving Winton, Queensland, Australia. It is located 3 nautical miles (5.6 km; 3.5 mi) northeast of Winton and operated by the Winton Shire Council.

== Facilities ==
The airport is at an elevation of 638 ft (194 m) above sea level. It has two runways: 14/32 with an asphalt surface measuring 1,402 m × 30 m (4,600 ft × 98 ft) and 05/23 with a clay surface measuring 890 m × 18 m (2,920 ft × 59 ft).

== Airlines and destinations ==
Airlines	Destinations
Rex Airlines	Longreach, Townsville

== See also ==
- List of airports in Queensland
