= Dunk Island Airport =

- IATA: DKI; ICAO: YDKI

Summary
- Airport type: Public
- Operator: Dunk Resort Pty Ltd
- Serves: Dunk Island, Queensland, Australia
- Elevation AMSL: 20 ft / 6 m
- Coordinates: 17°56′15″S 146°08′25″E

Map
- Location in Queensland

Runways
Direction	Length		Surface
Direction	m	ft	Surface
14/32	804	2,638	Bitumen
- Sources: AIP

Dunk Island Airport (IATA: DKI, ICAO: YDKI) is located on the west side of Dunk Island, Australia, only 5 km (3.1 mi) from Mission Beach. The airport is served from Cairns by Hinterland Aviation, in addition to general aviation charter and private flights.

== See also ==
- List of airports in Queensland
