= Osborne Mine Airport =

- IATA: OSO; ICAO: YOSB

Summary
- Airport type: Private
- Operator: Ivanhoe (Osborne) Pty Ltd
- Elevation AMSL: 935 ft / 285 m
- Coordinates: 22°04′54″S 140°33′24″E

Map
- Location in Queensland

Runways
Direction	Length		Surface
Direction	m	ft	Surface
12/30	2,000	6,562	Gravel
- Sources: Australian AIP and aerodrome chart

Osborne Mine Airport (IATA: OSO, ICAO: YOSB) is located adjacent to the Osborne Mine, Queensland, Australia.

== See also ==
- List of airports in Queensland
