= Wagga Wagga Airport =

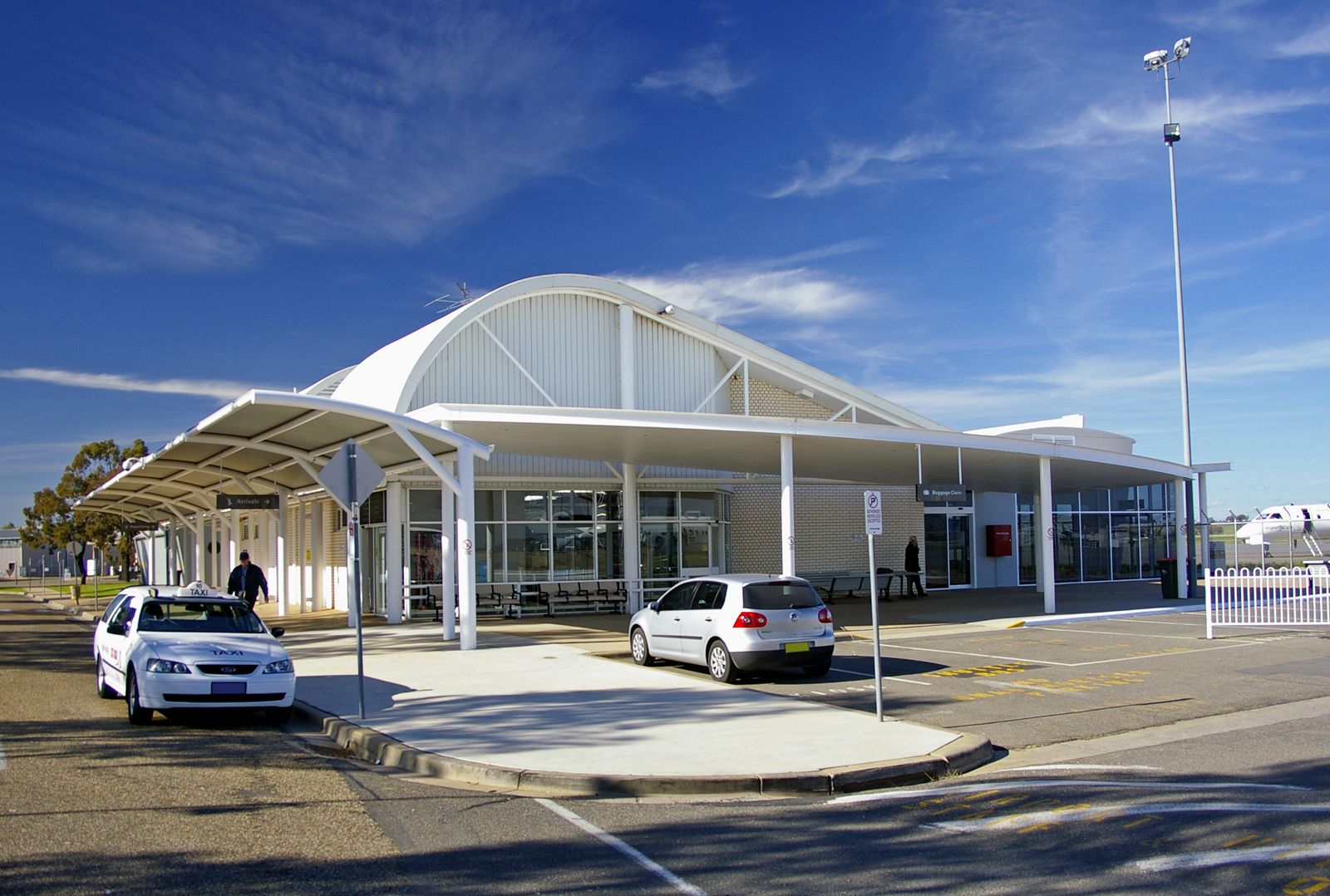
- Wagga Wagga Airport terminal
- IATA: WGA; ICAO: YSWG

Summary
- Airport type: Military/public
- Owner: Department of Defence
- Operator: City of Wagga Wagga
- Serves: Wagga Wagga
- Location: Forest Hill, New South Wales
- Elevation AMSL: 221 m (725 ft)
- Coordinates: 35°09′55″S 147°27′59″E
- Website: Wagga Wagga Airport

Map
- Location in New South Wales

Runways
Direction	Length		Surface
Direction	m	ft	Surface
05/23	1,768	5,801	Asphalt
12/30	894	2,933	Clay

Statistics (2018–19)
- Passengers: 206,912
- Aircraft movements: 6,692
- Sources: Australian AIP and aerodrome chart. Passengers and aircraft movements from Bureau of Infrastructure & Transport Research Economics.

Wagga Wagga Airport (IATA: WGA, ICAO: YSWG) is a regional airport serving Wagga Wagga in New South Wales, Australia. The airport is located in the suburb of Forest Hill, 11 kilometres (6.8 mi) south-east of the city centre, on land leased from the Department of Defence. It shares runways and some aviation facilities with the adjacent RAAF Base Wagga, which hosts ground training establishments and supporting military air traffic. Rex Airlines maintains a strong presence with its main engineering and maintenance base for its Saab 340 aircraft. The airline also conducts an in-house program to train cadet pilots through a campus of the Australian Airline Pilot Academy at the airport. In the 2020-21 financial year the airport recorded 71,862 passengers which made it the 36th busiest airport in Australia.

== History ==
=== Establishment ===
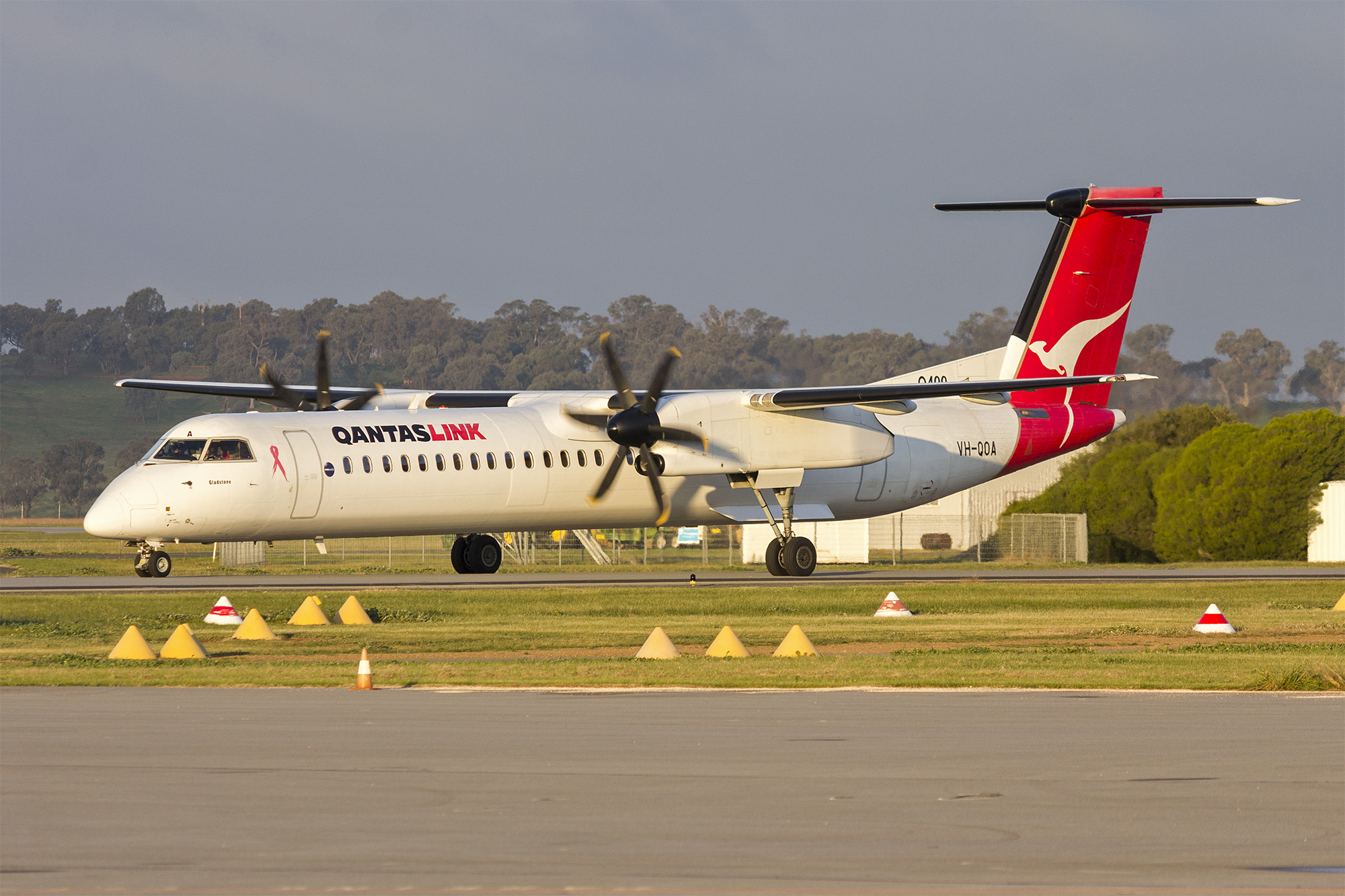
QantasLink Bombardier Dash 8

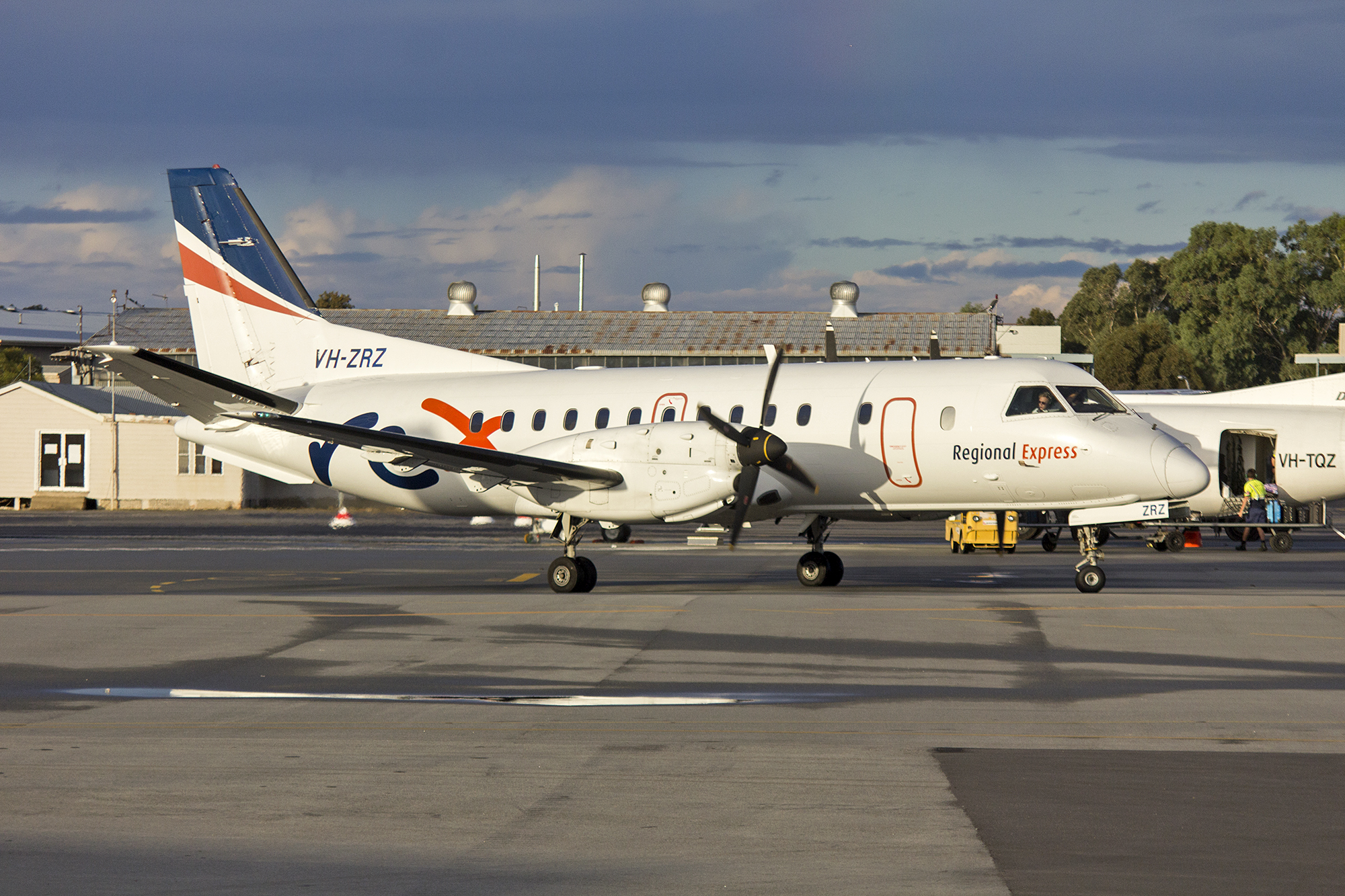
Rex Airlines Saab 340B

During 1939, the Royal Australian Air Force (RAAF) were looking to establish an inland training base. Pursuing this, Group Captain Harry Cobby (top scoring World War I ace) contacted Wagga resident Hughie Condon and asked him to suggest possible sites suitable for the establishment of an RAAF station. Condon was well suited to the task, being regional Examiner of Airmen with the Department of Defence. He recommended a site at the village of Forest Hill, this being situated about five nautical miles east of Wagga. The site was situated above the Murrumbidgee flood plain and was of suitable dimension. It was already serviced by rail, offered frontage to the Sturt Highway, and was sufficiently distant from the town of Wagga Wagga. Cobby flew to inspect the site, arriving in an RAAF Avro Anson. He agreed with Condon's assessment and the go-ahead was soon given. The identified land was resumed from the Brunskill and Lyons families in the first half of 1939 and before long, a Fearnes bus was shuttling workers to the site.

It is of note that this was planned as a permanent base and preceded the Empire Air Training Scheme. At this time the Wagga Wagga Council operated a civilian aerodrome. This was located on Hammond Avenue, East Wagga Wagga. Many other councils had hoped to host the new base. The Mayor of Junee, H.G. Weaver, claimed that Junee was a better choice, claiming it was less susceptible to fog, had flatter surrounding terrain and could offer railway workshops for aircraft repair.

The building layout was carefully designed so as to enable the aircraft landing area to have potential for 'all over' operations. Aircraft could potentially touch down anywhere, in any direction, according to the pilots' operational needs.

RAAF Forest Hill became operational on 29 July 1940 and initially was home to 2SFTS. Service Flying Training Schools conducted advanced training of graduates of the Elementary Flying Training Schools.

At the close of World War II, civilian flying recommenced. A decision was made to accommodate civilian flying operations at Forest Hill. A Bellman hangar was allocated for civilian use and Mobil/Vacuum installed an aircraft refuelling facility. At this time the council aerodrome on Hammond Avenue fell into disuse.

=== Post war expansion ===
With new transport aircraft, such as the Convair Metropolitan, coming into widespread use, it was decided to construct a bitumen runway. This was timed so as to be completed for Elizabeth II's visit to Wagga in 1954. The introduction of Fokker F28 regional jets by Airlines of New South Wales in 1983 to serve larger regional centres across the state necessitated further upgrades to Wagga Wagga Airport. The federal government funded the construction of a control tower and Air Traffic Control facilities. A new 780 m^{2} (8,400 sq ft) terminal building with separated arrival and departure areas and a kiosk was also constructed as part of the upgrade, replacing the 1940s facilities which had become crowded and inadequate. Surrounding the terminal, additional apron space was provided to simultaneously accommodate a regional jet, two commuter aircraft and one military transport (such as a C-130). A 200 m (660 ft) extension of runway 05/23 and full-length parallel taxiway was also investigated, but the government did not proceed with these works. At the time, projections indicated that the number of passengers handled by the airport would grow from 88,000 to over 130,000 per year by 2000, when there were expected to be 31,880 annual aircraft movements.

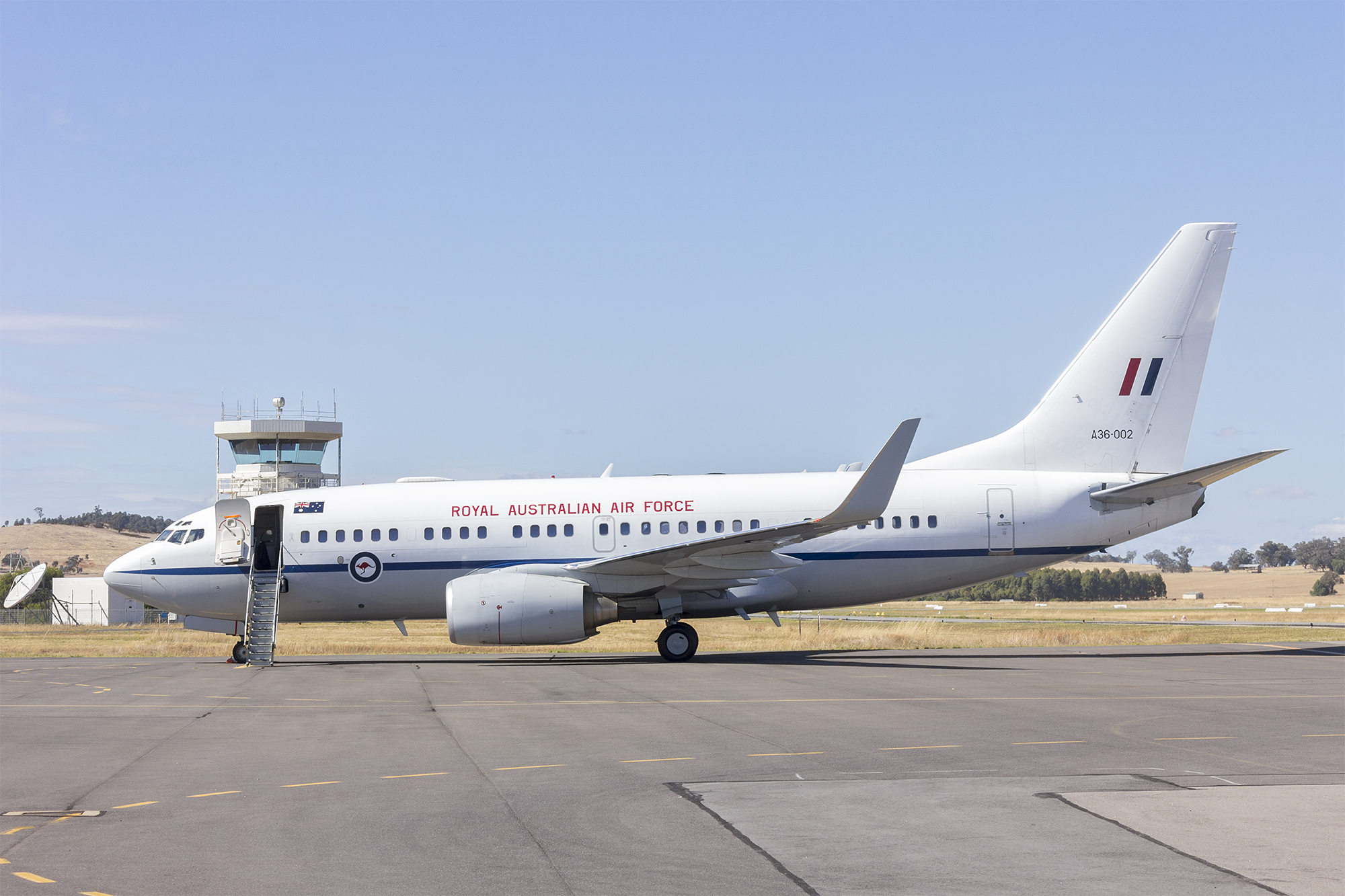
Royal Australian Air Force Boeing 737-BBJ

On 28 January 1992 the Wagga Wagga City Council secured a 30-year lease from the federal government which included a A$2 million to upgrade the airport's runway to allow it to handle Boeing 737s.

=== 21st century ===
In December 2009, a A$2.2 million upgrade to increase its capacity for future growth and to improve the security at the airport was completed.

On 27 May 2010, the then Minister for Infrastructure, Transport, Regional Development & Local Government Anthony Albanese announced that the federal government would provide funding worth $1.05 million, as part of the Regional and Local Community Infrastructure Program, to the Wagga Wagga City Council for the installation of the A$1.63 million Instrument Landing System (ILS), which were only found in all of Australia's capital cities. The ILS was commissioned by Airservices Australia on 16 December 2010.

Wagga Wagga City Council publicly released the Wagga Wagga Airport draft master plan in April 2010, to guide the airport's development to meet the city's projected growth over the next 20 years, including a new passenger terminal capable of supporting Boeing 737 sized jets.

In April 2011, a joint tender for security upgrades for baggage and passenger screening was called for Wagga Wagga, Tamworth and Dubbo Airports, which was set to be completed by July 2012. Wagga Wagga City Council was to receive A$650,000 from the federal government to purchase the baggage and passenger screening equipment, with the council funding A$162,000 to install the equipment.

In the 2011–12 financial year, Wagga Wagga City Council planned to develop a commercial aviation precinct at a cost of A$6.8 million, to attract aviation industries to the airport. The council would also allocate A$1.5 million for construction of 29 hangars for general aviation. The airport improvements funding were to be partly paid by the introduction of parking fees at the airport's carpark.

== Facilities ==
=== Heavy maintenance ===
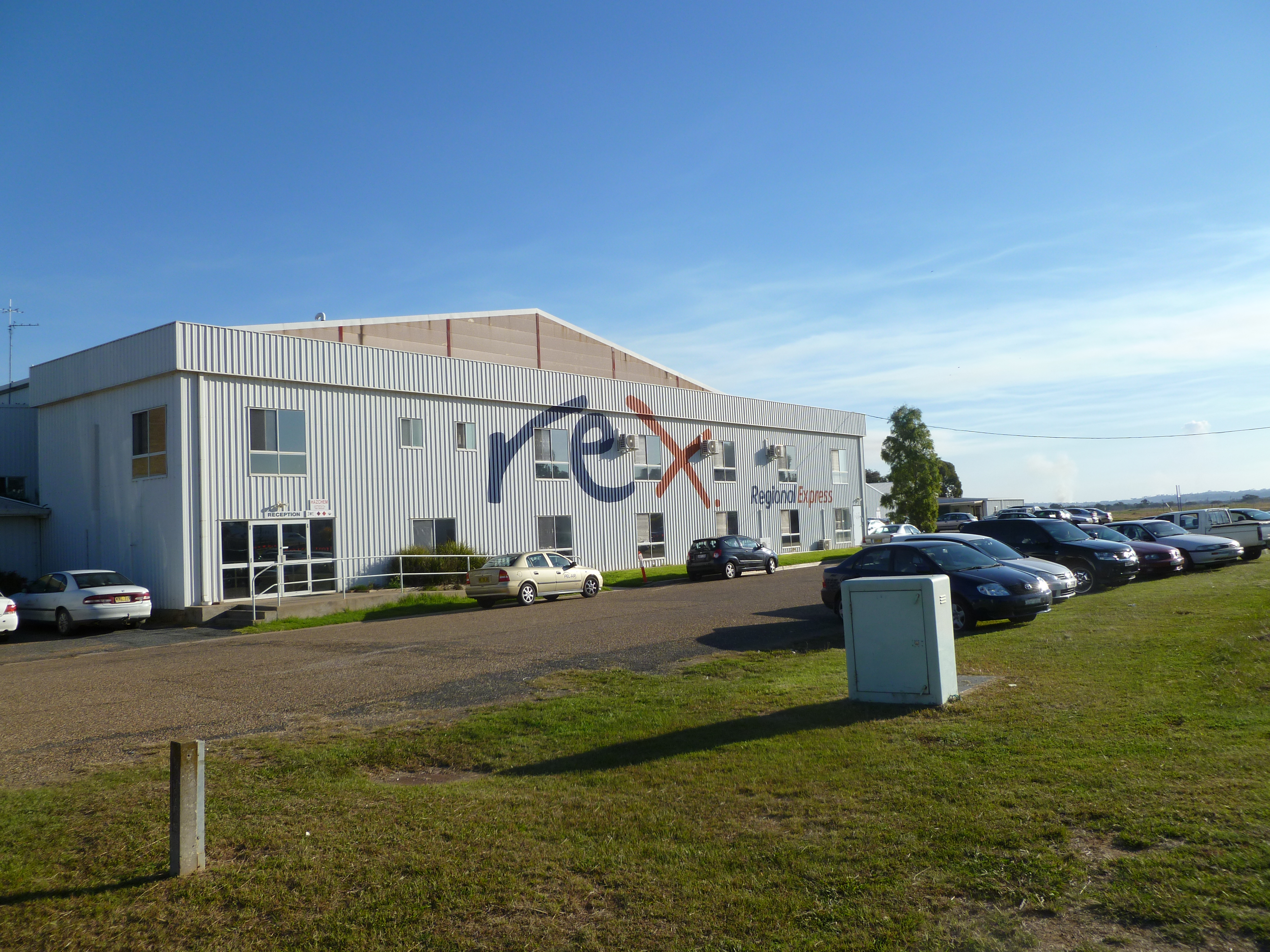
Rex Airlines heavy maintenance facility

In 1996, Hazelton Airlines opened the largest maintenance base in regional Australia with a 1,430 square metre hangar. It is now Rex Airlines' heavy maintenance facility for its Saab 340 aircraft.

Douglas Aerospace, a maintenance facility that specialises in painting aircraft has been based at the airport since 2012. Clients include military, corporate and airline operators. A former Virgin Australia Boeing 737 was repainted into the new Rex Airlines livery at the Wagga Wagga paint facility, before the type entered service with the airline. However they only painted one before the contract stated that the rest be painted elsewhere.

=== Rex pilot academy ===
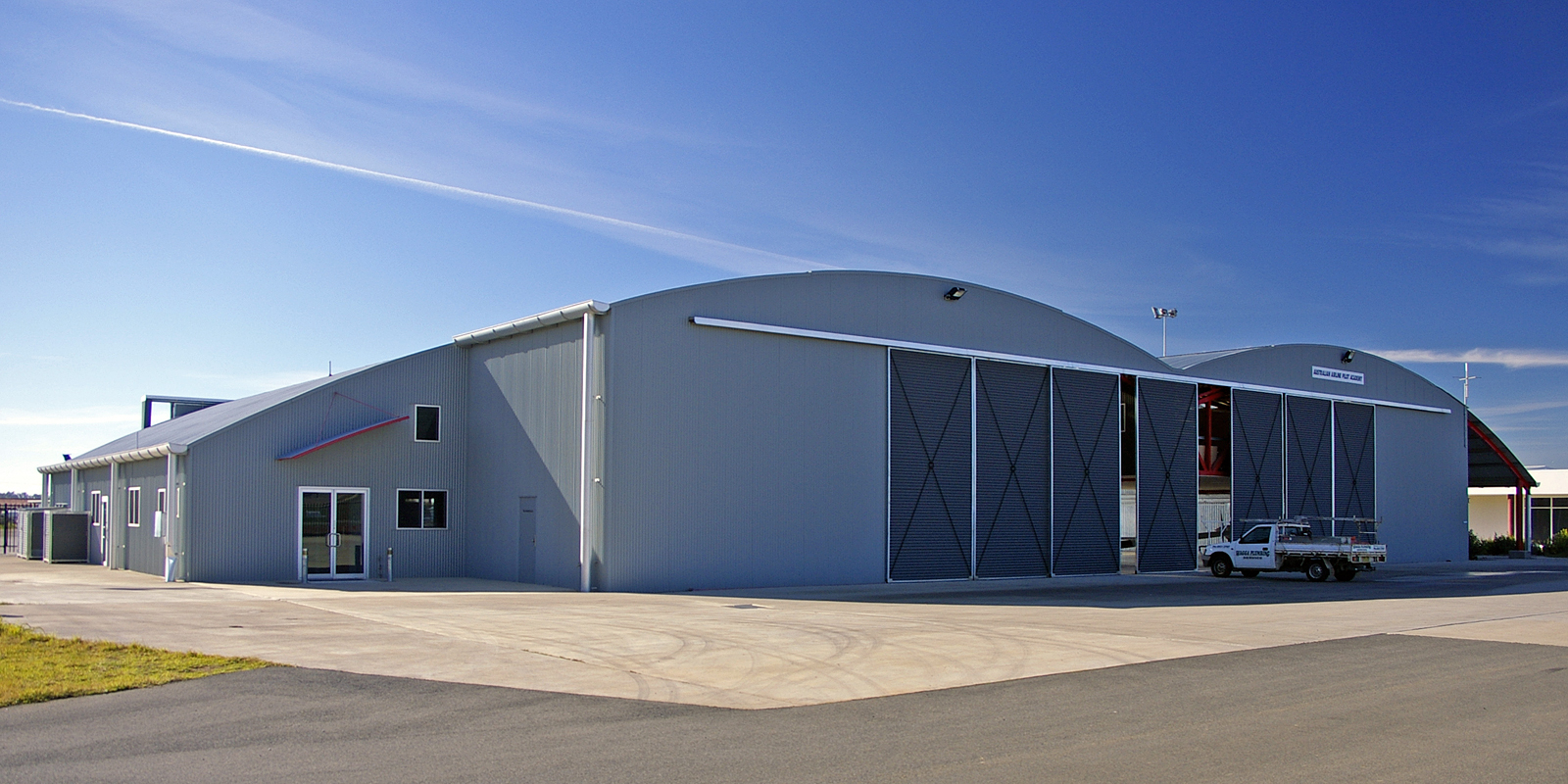
Australian Airline Pilot Academy hangar

The Australian Airline Pilot Academy campus at Wagga Wagga Airport was officially opened by Minister for Infrastructure, Transport, Regional Development & Local Government, Anthony Albanese on 27 May 2010, after relocating from Mangalore Airport in Victoria. The Academy operates a fleet of Piper PA-28 Warrior and Piper PA-44 Seminole from Wagga Wagga Airport. The campus provides residential accommodation and academic facilities for up to 200 cadets annually, as well as a simulator centre equipped with three Civil Aviation Safety Authority approved Category B synthetic trainers and a Saab 340 Full flight simulator.

== Airlines and destinations ==
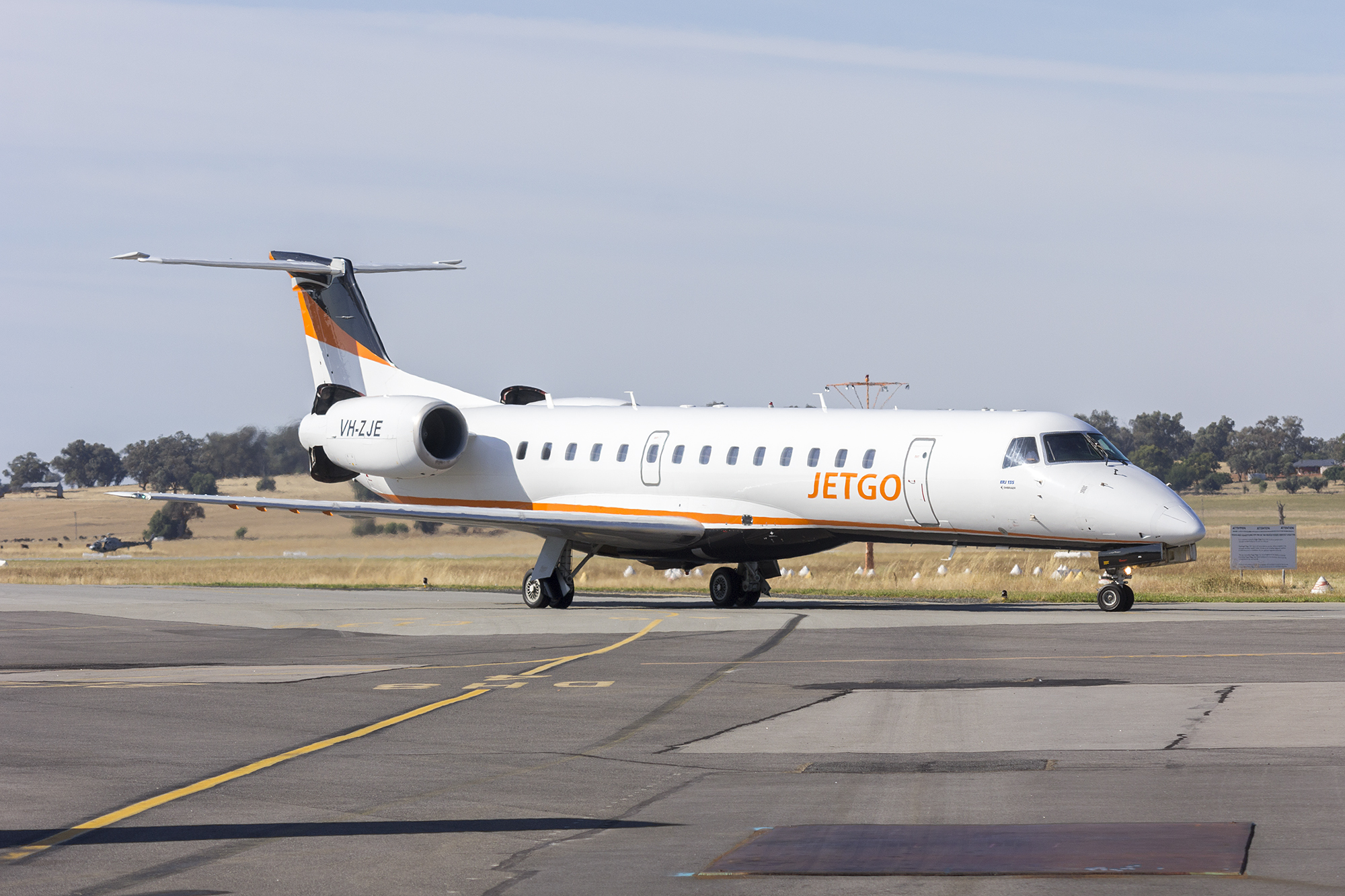
JetGo Embraer ERJ 140LR

Airlines	Destinations
QantasLink	Brisbane, Sydney–Kingsford Smith
Rex Airlines	Melbourne, Sydney–Kingsford Smith

== Passenger statistics ==
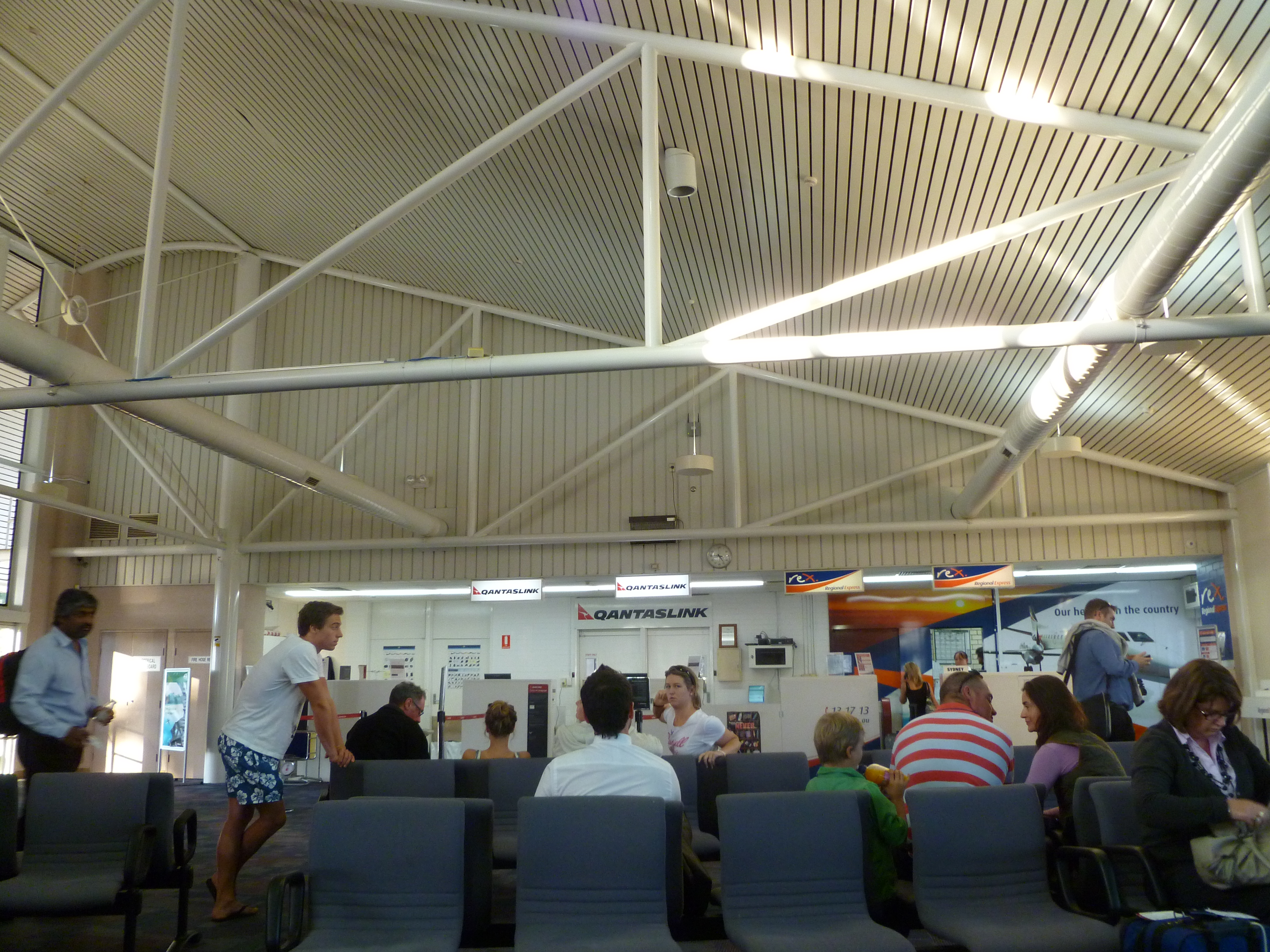
Passenger terminal

Annual passenger statistics for Wagga Wagga Airport
Year	Passenger numbers
2006–07	203,798
2007–08	225,394
2008–09	209,279
2009–10	208,866
2010–11	213,923
2011–12	207,633
2012–13	206,381
2013–14	210,934
2014–15	209,671
2015–16	214,247
2016–17	217,021
2017–18	224,499
2018–19	206,912
2019–20	151,319
2020–21	71,862
