= BWV (disambiguation) =

BWV is the Bach-Werke-Verzeichnis, the standard numbered catalogue of the works of Johann Sebastian Bach.

BWV may also refer to:

- Bavarian Forest Club (German: Bayerischer Wald-Verein)
- Body-worn video

== See also ==
- Buxtehude-Werke-Verzeichnis (BuxWV)
