= Arrabury =

Pastoral lease in Queensland

Coordinates: 26.80383°S 140.92559°E

Location in Queensland

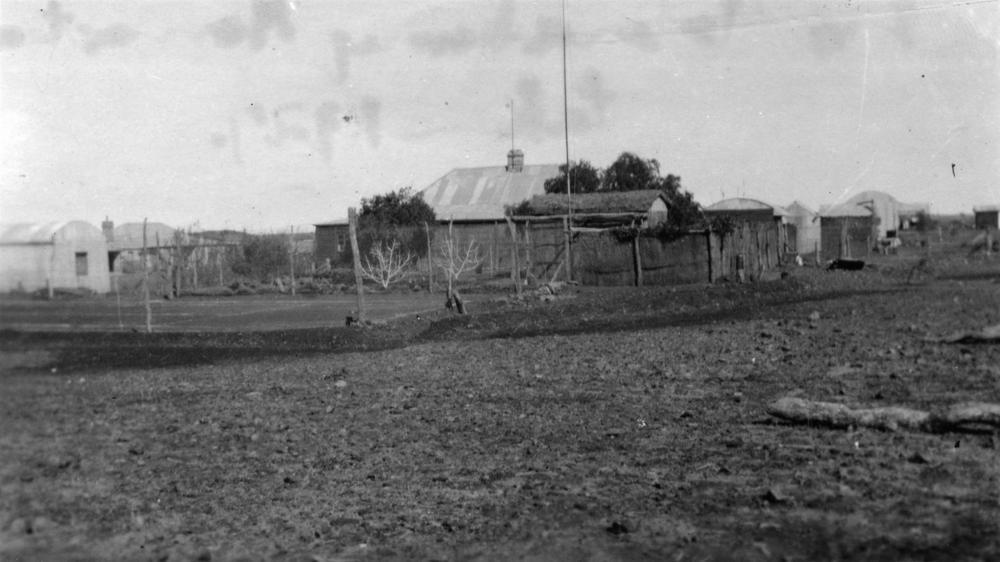
Arrabury Station Homestead, 1927

Arrabury Station is a pastoral lease that currently operates as a cattle station in Queensland.

It is located approximately 106 kilometres (66 mi) north of Innamincka and 186 kilometres (116 mi) south east of Birdsville in the Channel Country of Queensland.

The Arrabury Pastoral Company, controlled by the Daley family, currently own the property along with neighbouring Cluny station that was acquired in 1992. Arrubury occupies and area of 7,600 square kilometres (2,934 sq mi) and Cluny has an area of 5,500 square kilometres (2,124 sq mi). Both properties are used to fatten cattle that were bred in the gulf country.

The property was established and selling cattle at some time prior to 1887, in 1888 the then owner, William Campbell, sold the property along with his other holdings, Doonmulla, Thackabury and Kangarrah. William Henry Lindsay was the purchaser. By 1892 the property was selling wool at the Melbourne market.

In 1903 the store and a part of the homestead burnt down resulting in the loss hundreds of pounds worth of stores.

The Arrabury Pastoral Company was formed in 1917 with £30,000 of capital to acquire the 945 square miles (2,448 km^{2}) Arrabury and surrounding leases. The directors were William Henry Lindsay, J. B. Howe, W. S. Fraser and W. Alison.

Encompassing an area of 1,600 square miles (4,144 km^{2}) Arrabury was stocked with 7,500 head of cattle. The property has switched from sheep to cattle at some time prior to 1949 following repeated dingo attacks on the sheep. The entire area was struck by drought in 1946 with many cattle dying and properties destocking. The Cooper Creek broke its banks in 1949 again in 1950 resulting in widespread flooding through the area.

Struck by drought between 2002 and 2007 the rain arrived producing more feed for stock.

Bushfires swept through the area in 2011 causing a large loss of feed on many properties.

== See also ==
- List of ranches and stations
- List of the largest stations in Australia
