= Barcaldine Airport =

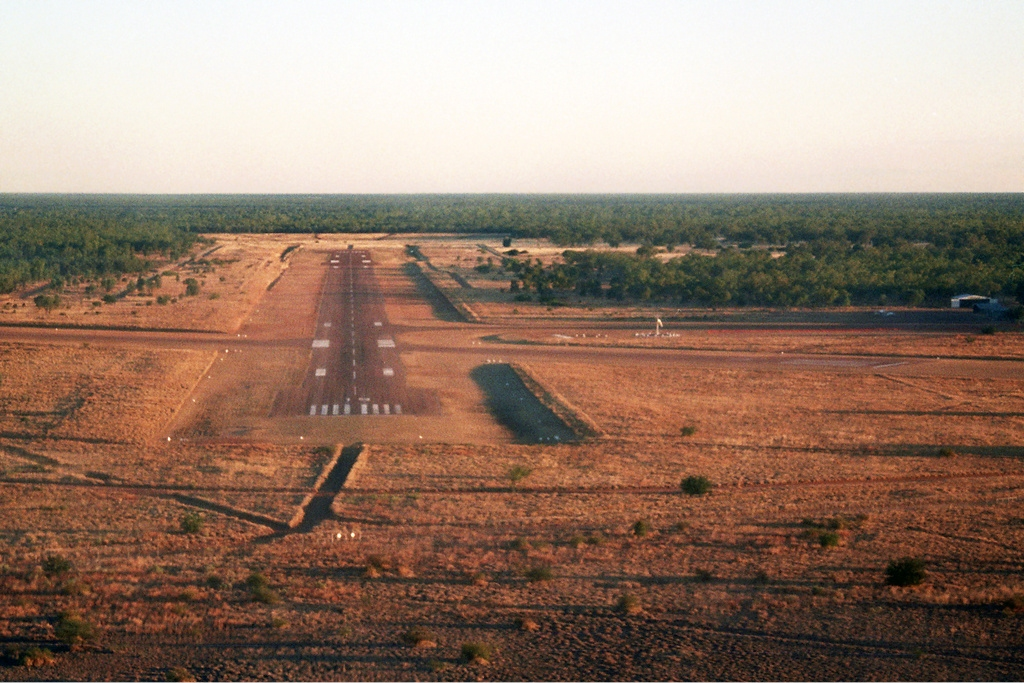
- IATA: BCI; ICAO: YBAR

Summary
- Airport type: Public
- Operator: Barcaldine Regional Council
- Location: Barcaldine, Queensland
- Elevation AMSL: 880 ft / 268 m
- Coordinates: 23°33′41.7″S 145°18′12.5″E

Map
- Location in Queensland

Runways
| Direction | Length | | Surface |
| Direction | m | ft | Surface |
|---|---|---|---|
| 01/19 | 1,702 | 5,584 | Asphalt |
| 14/32 | 1,115 | 3,658 | Clay |
- Sources: Australian AIP and aerodrome chart

Barcaldine Airport (IATA: BCI, ICAO: YBAR) is an airport in Barcaldine, Queensland, Australia.

Situated at an altitude of 271 m, the airport has a single runway. It is operated by Barcaldine Region.

== Airlines and destinations ==
| Airlines | Destinations |
|---|---|
| QantasLink | Brisbane, Longreach |

== See also ==
- List of airports in Queensland
