= List of airports by ICAO code: YA-YG =

List of airports by ICAO code: A - B - C - D - EB-EG - EH-EY - FA-FM - FN-FZ - G - H - ~~I~~ - J - KA-KH - KI-KP - KR-KZ - LA-LJ - LK-LZ - M - N - O - P - Q - R - SA-SC - SD-SH - SI - SJ - SK-SM - SN-SP - SQ - SS-SU - SV-SY - T - U - V - W - ~~X~~ - YA-YG - YH-YQ - YR-YZ - Z

Also see airport category and list.

== YA ==
ICAO	IATA	Airport name	Community	Coordinates	Notes
YAAL		Yarralin Airport	Yarralin, Northern Territory	16°26′35″S 130°52′44″E	
YAAQ		Adelaide Aquatic Centre Heliport	North Adelaide, South Australia	34°54′07″S 138°35′31″E	Closed
YABA	ALH	Albany Airport	Albany, Western Australia	34°56′36″S 117°48′32″E	
YABB		Upper Warrego Airstrip	Upper Warrego, Queensland	25°11′39″S 147°08′34″E	
YABD		Aberdeen Airport	Wyaga, Queensland	28°04′03″S 150°38′30″E	
YABF		Aberfoyle Airport	Torrens Creek, Queensland	21°40′14″S 145°15′58″E	
YABG		Abbieglassie Airstrip	Bargunyah, Queensland	27°14′54″S 147°34′41″E	
YABI	ABG	Abingdon Downs Airport	Abingdon Downs, Queensland	17°36′27″S 143°11′01″E	
YABL		Ambalindum Airport	Hart, Northern Territory	23°21′07″S 134°43′57″E	
YABP		Mooga/Brindley Park Airstrip	Mooga, Queensland	26°19′31″S 148°55′47″E	
YABR		Abra Mine Camp Airport	Peak Hill, Western Australia	24°37′27″S 118°37′13″E	
YABS		Albion Downs Aerodrome	Wiluna, Western Australia	27°17′00″S 120°22′59″E	
YABU		Amburla Airstrip	Burt Plain, Northern Territory	23°20′24″S 133°10′20″E	
YACD		Alice Downs Station Aerodrome	Blackall, Queensland	24°16′10″S 145°29′19″E	
YACI		Arcadia Airstrip	Arcadia Valley, Queensland	25°12′39″S 148°40′06″E	
YACR		Lotus Creek/Croyden Airstrip	Lotus Creek, Queensland	22°28′23″S 149°09′26″E	
YACS		Acacia Downs Airport	Acacia Downs, New South Wales	31°25′00″S 141°54′00″E	
YADA		Adavale Aerodrome	Adavale, Queensland	25°53′42″S 144°34′11″E	
YADD		Arubiddy Aerodrome	Cocklebiddy, Western Australia	31°48′49″S 125°55′11″E	
YADE		Annandale Airstrip	Coppabella, Queensland	21°56′35″S 148°17′04″E	
YADG		Aldinga Airfield	Aldinga, South Australia	35°17′23″S 138°29′35″E	
YADH		Old Ashburton Downs Homestead Airstrip	Innawonga Community, Western Australia	23°24′20″S 117°04′58″E	
YADL		Adele Island Airstrip	Adele Island, Western Australia	15°30′58″S 123°09′15″E	
YADM		Yandan Mine Airstrip	Mount Coolon, Queensland	21°16′30″S 146°59′23″E	
YADN		Angas Downs Airstrip	Petermann, Northern Territory	25°01′57″S 132°16′29″E	
YADO		Andado Airstrip	Ghan, Northern Territory	25°24′28″S 135°17′27″E	
YADR		Aldersyde Airstrip	Miles, Queensland	26°39′48″S 150°11′40″E	
YADS	AWN	Alton Downs Airport	Alton Downs, South Australia	26°29′19″S 139°15′36″E	
YADU		Ardgour Airstrip	Ardgour, New South Wales	31°39′09″S 150°02′26″E	
YADY		Adaminaby Airport	Adaminaby, New South Wales	35°59′54″S 148°47′48″E	
YAFD		The Alfred Hospital Heliport	Melbourne, Victoria	37°50′43″S 144°58′53″E	
YAGD	AUD	Augustus Downs Airport	Stokes, Queensland	18°30′56″S 139°52′43″E	
YAGL		Argyle Airstrip	Kingsthorpe, Queensland	27°28′53″S 151°47′47″E	
YAGN	AGW	Agnew Airstrip	Mapoon, Queensland	12°08′44″S 142°08′58″E	
YAGP		Angel Platform Oil Rig Heliport	Offshore Western Australia	19°29′55″S 116°35′53″E	
YAGR		Agincourt Reef Sea Heliport	Coral Sea Islands	16°01′00″S 145°51′00″E	
YAHD		Ashburton Downs Aerodrome	Innawanga, Western Australia	23°22′51″S 117°01′32″E	
YAGR		Agincourt North Sea Heliport	Coral Sea Islands	15°58′52″S 145°49′13″E	
YAIR		Beela Airstrip	Beela, New South Wales	29°23′47″S 149°52′12″E	
YAIS		Agincourt South Sea Heliport	Coral Sea Islands	16°02′08″S 145°50′05″E	
YAIW		Adelaide International Raceway Heliport	Waterloo Corner, South Australia	34°41′48″S 138°33′54″E	Closed
YAKG		Arckaringa Airstrip	Arckaringa Station, South Australia	27°56′48″S 134°44′42″E	
YALA	MRP	Marla Airport	Welbourn Hill, South Australia	27°20′03″S 133°37′35″E	
YALC		Alcoota Station Airstrip	Anmatjere, Northern Territory	22°48′07″S 134°24′13″E	
YALD		Alroy Downs Airstrip	Tablelands, Northern Territory	19°17′27″S 136°04′44″E	
YALG		Adels Grove Airstrip	Lawn Hill, Queensland	18°41′33″S 138°31′53″E	
YALH		Albilbah Aerodrome	Isisford, Queensland	24°42′44″S 144°17′27″E	
YALM		Allambie Airstrip	Hale, Northern Territory	24°15′55″S 134°24′11″E	
YALN		Allandy Station Airport	Allandy Station, New South Wales	30°23′18″S 142°37′31″E	
YALP		Alpurrurulam Airstrip	Alpurrurulam, Northern Territory	20°59′06″S 137°49′59″E	
YALR		Aileron Airstrip	Anmatjere, Northern Territory	22°39′05″S 133°20′48″E	
YALT		Althorpe Island Airstrip	Althorpe Islands, South Australia	35°22′14″S 136°51′40″E	Closed
YALX	AXL	Alexandria Station Airport	Alexandria Station, Northern Territory	19°03′37″S 136°42′36″E	
YALY		Alderley Airstrip	Georgina, Queensland	22°29′36″S 139°39′21″E	
YAMA		Yamba Heliport	Yamba, New South Wales	29°26′39″S 153°20′43″E	
YAMB		RAAF Amberley	Ipswich, Queensland	27°38′26″S 152°42′43″E	
YAMC	AXC	Aramac Airport	Aramac, Queensland	22°57′28″S 145°14′59″E	
YAMJ		Ampilatwatja Airstrip	Ampilatwatja, Northern Territory	21°39′18″S 135°13′51″E	
YAMK	ADO	Andamooka Airport	Andamooka, South Australia	30°26′18″S 137°08′12″E	
YAML		Armraynald Airstrip	Burketown, Queensland	17°57′17″S 139°45′35″E	
YAMM	AMX	Ammaroo Airport	Ammaroo, Northern Territory	21°44′18″S 135°14′31″E	
YAMN		El Alamein Landing Ground	Cultana, South Australia	32°32′15″S 137°41′36″E	
YAMO		Belyando Airstrip	Belyando, Queensland	21°56′37″S 146°38′00″E	
YAMT	AMT	Amata Airport	Amata, South Australia	26°05′48″S 131°12′12″E	
YAND		Answer Downs Airstrip	McKinlay, Queensland	21°40′18″S 140°59′13″E	
YANE		Mount Anne Heliport	South West Tasmania	42°56′33″S 146°25′30″E	Closed
YANG	WLP	West Angelas Airport	West Angelas, Western Australia	23°08′10″S 118°42′40″E	
YANJ		Angatja Airstrip	Anangu Pitjantjatjara Yankunytjatjara, South Australia	26°06′00″S 130°24′00″E	Coordinates unverified
YANK		Anna Creek Airstrip	Anna Creek Station, South Australia	28°53′50″S 136°10′14″E	
YANL	AYL	Anthony Lagoon Airport	Anthony Lagoon, Northern Territory	18°01′05″S 135°32′06″E	
YANN		Anningie Airstrip	Anmatjere, Northern Territory	21°49′54″S 133°07′30″E	
YANO		Arno HS Airstrip	Isisford, Queensland	24°44′13″S 143°43′06″E	
YANR		Anaburroo Airstrip	Point Stuart, Northern Territory	12°53′01″S 131°41′04″E	
YANW		Annitowa Airstrip	Costello, Northern Territory	21°11′55″S 136°27′02″E	
YAOC		Opal Creek Airstrip	Dunmore, Queensland	27°40′04″S 150°55′58″E	
YAOD		Australia Age of Dinosaurs Museum Heliport	Corfield, Queensland	22°28′51″S 143°10′56″E	
YAOR		Ardmore Airstrip	Waverley, Queensland	21°39′01″S 139°11′39″E	
YAOV		Adelaide Oval Heliport	North Adelaide, South Australia	34°54′56″S 138°35′53″E	Closed
YAPA		Anna Plains Airstrip	Eighty Mile Beach, Western Australia	19°16′05″S 121°30′41″E	
YAPH	ABH	Alpha Airport	Alpha, Queensland	23°38′48″S 146°35′00″E	
YAPK		Albany Park Airstrip	Batchelor, Northern Territory	13°05′10″S 131°02′12″E	
YAPO		Apollo Bay Airport	Apollo Bay, Victoria	38°46′29″S 143°39′40″E	
YAQA		Aquila Airpark	Yengarie, Queensland	25°31′44″S 152°34′12″E	
YAQM		Aquila Mine Heliport	Bundoora, Queensland	22°58′38″S 148°33′08″E	Closed
YARA	ARY	Ararat Airport	Ararat, Victoria	37°18′36″S 142°59′18″E	
YARC		Archer River Airstrip	Archer River, Queensland	13°26′11″S 142°55′44″E	
YARD		Argadargada Airstrip	Costello, Northern Territory	21°40′36″S 136°40′41″E	
YARE		Redford Airstrip	Redford, Queensland	25°50′20″S 147°24′44″E	
YARF		Arlington Reef Seaplane Base	Coral Sea Islands	16°41′12″S 146°04′37″E	
YARG	GYL	Argyle Airport	Lake Argyle, Western Australia	16°38′13″S 128°27′05″E	
YARI		Arizona 1 Airstrip	Kynuna, Queensland	21°40′15″S 141°33′48″E	
YARK		Arkaroola Airstrip	Wooltana Station, South Australia	30°24′23″S 139°20′48″E	
YARL		Ardlethan Airport	Ardlethan, New South Wales	34°24′41″S 146°51′32″E	
YARM	ARM	Armidale Airport	Armidale, New South Wales	30°31′42″S 151°37′00″E	
YARN		Areyonga Airstrip	Areyonga, Northern Territory	24°05′30″S 132°16′16″E	
YARP		Arapunya Airstrip	Sandover, Northern Territory	22°19′08″S 135°42′08″E	
YARR		Rugby Run Airstrip	Moranbah, Queensland	22°07′42″S 147°53′08″E	
YARS		Ardrossan Airstrip	Ardrossan, South Australia	34°26′50″S 137°53′18″E	
YARY	AAB	Arrabury Airport	Arrabury, Queensland	26°41′24″S 141°02′48″E	
YASF		Ashford Airstrip	Ashford, New South Wales	29°19′02″S 151°03′22″E	
YASG		Adelaide Showgrounds Heliport	Wayville, South Australia	34°56′48″S 138°35′12″E	Closed
YASH		Ashgrove Airstrip	Cranley, Queensland	27°29′53″S 151°54′54″E	Closed
YASS		Bakblok Airstrip	Yass, New South Wales	34°53′12″S 149°00′54″E	
YAST		Anglestone Airstrip	Oombabeer, Queensland	24°37′32″S 149°44′44″E	
YATL		Atula Airstrip	Anatye, Northern Territory	23°15′19″S 136°23′20″E	
YATN		Atherton Airstrip	Atherton, Queensland	17°15′43″S 145°30′52″E	
YATP		Yatpool Airstrip	Red Cliffs, Victoria	34°21′14″S 142°10′10″E	Closed
YATR		Amphitheatre Airstrip	Amphitheatre, Victoria	37°09′51″S 143°27′36″E	
YATU		Arcturus Downs Homestead Airfield	Arcturus, Queensland	24°02′16″S 148°24′27″E	
YATY		Atley Aerodrome	Sandstone, Western Australia	28°13′34″S 119°01′04″E	
YAUA		Augathella Aerodrome	Augathella, Queensland	25°45′18″S 146°35′13″E	
YAUB		Auburn Airstrip	Auburn, Queensland	25°56′40″S 150°36′38″E	
YAUG		Tallinup-Augusta Airport	Augusta, Western Australia	34°19′48″S 115°09′24″E	
YAUL		Aratula Airstrip	Aratula, Queensland	27°58′40″S 152°33′50″E	
YAUR	AUU	Aurukun Airport	Aurukun, Queensland	13°21′23″S 141°43′15″E	
YAUS	AWP	Austral Downs Station Airport	Austral Downs Station, Northern Territory	20°29′36″S 137°45′59″E	
YAUT		Auteuil Aerodrome	Aramac, Queensland	23°08′57″S 145°12′05″E	
YAUV	AVG	Auvergne Airport (Australia)	Auvergne Station, Northern Territory	15°41′26″S 130°00′32″E	
YAVD		Avon Downs Airstrip	Ranken, Northern Territory	20°02′12″S 137°31′14″E	
YAVE		Avalon East Airshow Airfield	Point Wilson, Victoria	38°01′55″S 144°29′32″E	
YAVM		Avonmore Airstrip	Avonmore, Victoria	36°33′18″S 144°32′58″E	
YAVN		Avondale Airstrip	Bungowannah, New South Wales	36°00′22″S 146°44′15″E	
YAVS		Alstonville South Airstrip	Lynwood, New South Wales	28°52′55″S 153°26′07″E	
YAVY		Avymore Airstrip	Boggabilla, New South Wales	28°41′15″S 149°55′59″E	
YAWT		Agnes Water Airstrip	Agnes Water, Queensland	24°12′08″S 151°53′33″E	
YAXA		Alexandra Hospital Heliport	Alexandra, Victoria	37°11′44″S 145°43′03″E	
YAYE	AYQ	Ayers Rock Airport	Yulara, Northern Territory	25°11′10″S 130°58′32″E	
YAYR	AYR	Ayr Airport	Ayr, Queensland	19°35′47″S 147°19′29″E	

== YB ==
ICAO	IATA	Airport name	Community	Coordinates	Notes
YBAA		Baroalba Airstrip	Kakadu, Northern Territory	12°49′28″S 132°49′10″E	
YBAB		Baralaba Airstrip	Kokotungo, Queensland	24°11′36″S 149°50′36″E	
YBAD		Baradine Aerodrome	Baradine, New South Wales	30°57′18″S 149°05′30″E	
YBAF		Archerfield Airport	Archerfield, Queensland	27°34′13″S 153°00′29″E	
YBAH		Bauhinia Downs Airstrip	McArthur, Northern Territory	16°08′00″S 135°28′01″E	Closed
YBAK		Brooklands Airpark	Tailem Bend, South Australia	35°19′49″S 139°25′52″E	
YBAL		Balladonia Airstrip	Fraser Range, Western Australia	32°20′48″S 123°36′54″E	
YBAN		Mount Barnett Airstrip	Wunaamin Miliwundi Ranges, Western Australia	16°44′29″S 125°54′20″E	
YBAO		Braidwood Airstrip	Braidwood, New South Wales	35°26′17″S 149°50′40″E	
YBAR	BCI	Barcaldine Airport	Barcaldine, Queensland	23°33′42″S 145°18′13″E	
YBAS	ASP	Alice Springs Airport	Alice Springs, Northern Territory	23°48′25″S 133°54′08″E	
YBAT		Batt Reef Seaplane Base	Coral Sea Islands	16°25′00″S 145°46′00″E	
YBAU	BDD	Badu Island Airport	Badu Island, Queensland	10°09′00″S 142°10′30″E	
YBAW	BKP	Barkly Downs Airport	Barkly Downs, Queensland	20°29′45″S 138°28′29″E	
YBAY		Baygurtji Airstrip	East Arnhem, Northern Territory	13°08′47″S 135°49′03″E	
YBBA		Barraba Airstrip	Barraba, New South Wales	30°23′37″S 150°35′52″E	
YBBC		Bamboo Creek Airstrip	Marble Bar, Western Australia	20°56′41″S 120°09′54″E	
YBBE		Big Bell Airstrip	Big Bell Gold Mine, Western Australia	27°19′42″S 117°40′18″E	
YBBF		Brooklet/Blueberry Fields Airstrip	Brooklet, New South Wales	28°44′23″S 153°29′14″E	
YBBH		Birri Beach Airstrip	Mornington Island, Queensland	16°28′54″S 139°17′13″E	
YBBL		Billabalong Aerodrome	Murchison, Western Australia	27°25′04″S 115°50′04″E	
YBBN	BNE	Brisbane Airport	Brisbane, Queensland	27°23′00″S 153°07′06″E	
YBBO		Bon Bon Aerodrome	Bon Bon Reserve, South Australia	30°24′11″S 135°28′55″E	Military
YBBS		Ban Ban Springs Airstrip	Burrundie, Northern Territory	13°22′37″S 131°29′43″E	
YBBT		Boort Airstrip	Boort, Victoria	36°08′14″S 143°43′14″E	
YBBY		Bingil Bay Airfield	Midgeree Bar, Queensland	17°48′07″S 146°03′45″E	
YBCA		Bulla Camp Airfield	Baines, Northern Territory	15°46′13″S 130°02′59″E	
YBCB		Bencubbin Airstrip	Bencubbin, Western Australia	30°49′17″S 117°52′02″E	
YBCD		Blackwood Airstrip	Wychie, Queensland	26°44′19″S 150°53′00″E	
YBCF		Beaconsfield Airstrip	Ilfracombe, Queensland	23°19′24″S 144°35′20″E	
YBCG	OOL	Gold Coast Airport	Coolangatta, Queensland	28°09′54″S 153°30′22″E	
YBCH		Beechworth Airstrip	Beechworth, Victoria	36°23′36″S 146°41′47″E	
YBCK	BKQ	Blackall Airport	Blackall, Queensland	24°25′54″S 145°25′47″E	
YBCL		Boolcarrol Station Airstrip	Boolcarrol, New South Wales	30°03′00″S 149°25′01″E	Closed
YBCM		Coominya Airstrip	Coominya, Queensland	27°23′26″S 152°28′00″E	
YBCR		Batchelor Airstrip	Batchelor, Northern Territory	13°03′24″S 131°01′44″E	
YBCS	CNS	Cairns Airport	Cairns, Queensland	16°53′09″S 145°45′19″E	
YBCT		Black Tip Sea Heliport	Joseph Bonaparte Gulf, Western Australia	13°53′42″S 128°29′03″E	
YBCV	CTL	Charleville Airport	Charleville, Queensland	26°24′44″S 146°15′44″E	
YBCX		Kooringal/Baroco Airstrip	Moreton Island, Queensland	27°20′45″S 153°25′33″E	
YBDA		Bedarra Island Seaplane Base	Bedarra Island, Queensland	18°00′04″S 146°08′41″E	
YBDD		Braidwood Aerodrome	Jundah, Queensland	24°48′35″S 143°00′25″E	
YBDF	BDW	Bedford Downs Aerodrome	Bedford Downs Station, Western Australia	17°17′12″S 127°27′47″E	
YBDG	BXG	Bendigo Airport	Bendigo, Victoria	36°44′22″S 144°19′47″E	
YBDI		Badger Island Airstrip	Badger Island, Tasmania	40°19′07″S 147°53′21″E	
YBDL		Bracadale Station Airstrip	Petherick, South Australia	36°20′52″S 140°05′00″E	Closed
YBDM		Old Bundemar Airstrip	Bundemar, New South Wales	31°48′29″S 148°09′55″E	
YBDO		Ballandool Airstrip	Hebel, Queensland	28°57′59″S 147°40′23″E	
YBDP		Bridport Airport	Bridport, Tasmania	41°01′19″S 147°24′25″E	
YBDR		Beaudesert Heliport	Tabragalba, Queensland	28°00′52″S 153°04′14″E	Closed
YBDS		Birthday Siding Airstrip	Bulgunnia Station, South Australia	30°17′20″S 134°31′42″E	Military; formerly YQUA
YBDU		Birrindudu Airstrip	Buchanan, Northern Territory	18°23′04″S 129°26′15″E	
YBDV	BVI	Birdsville Airport	Birdsville, Queensland	25°53′27″S 139°20′40″E	
YBDX		Barradale Airstrip	Yannarie, Western Australia	22°51′48″S 114°57′40″E	
YBEA		Beeantha Airstrip	Malpas-Trenton, Queensland	20°18′27″S 142°11′59″E	
YBEB	BXF	Bellburn Airport	Shire of Halls Creek, Western Australia	17°32′41″S 128°18′18″E	
YBEC		Beacon Airstrip	Beacon, Western Australia	30°28′29″S 117°52′48″E	
YBED		Berridale Airstrip	Berridale, New South Wales	36°20′57″S 148°49′26″E	
YBEE		Beverley Mine Airstrip	Wooltana Station, South Australia	30°11′12″S 139°33′30″E	
YBEF		Beaufort Strathdale Airstrip	Beaufort, Victoria	37°27′00″S 143°15′00″E	Closed
YBEG		Bening Field Airstrip	Dotswood, Queensland	19°39′12″S 146°17′37″E	Military
YBEL		Bothwell Gliding Club Airstrip	Bothwell, Tasmania	42°22′10″S 147°01′46″E	
YBEO	BTX	Betoota Airport	Betoota, Queensland	25°41′42″S 140°44′12″E	
YBER		Bremer Bay Aerodrome	Bremer Bay, Western Australia	34°22′52″S 119°20′24″E	
YBES		Beswick Airstrip	Beswick Creek, Northern Territory	14°35′29″S 133°06′41″E	Closed
YBET		Bellata Airstrip	Bellata, New South Wales	29°55′06″S 149°46′54″E	
YBEU		Beulah 1 Airstrip	Beulah, Victoria	35°56′47″S 142°25′48″E	
YBEV		Beverley Aerodrome	Beverley, Western Australia	32°07′29″S 116°57′00″E	
YBEW		Beechworth Airstrip	Beechworth, New South Wales	31°55′00″S 144°38′44″E	
YBEX		Bedout Island Seaplane Base	Bedout Island, Western Australia	19°34′59″S 119°06′01″E	
YBEY		Barenya Aerodrome	Tangorin, Queensland	21°37′40″S 144°10′10″E	
YBFM		Beef Machine Airstrip	Condingup, Western Australia	33°45′12″S 122°21′45″E	
YBFR		Balfour Aerodrome	West Coast, Tasmania	41°15′33″S 144°53′10″E	
YBFT		Beaufort Airstrip	Nerring, Victoria	37°29′40″S 143°25′48″E	
YBFW		Beefwood Heliport	Wyuna, Queensland	23°18′41″S 148°29′12″E	
YBGB		Beagle Bay Airstrip	Dampier Peninsula, Western Australia	17°00′59″S 122°38′47″E	
YBGD	OCM	Boolgeeda Airport	Boolgeeda, Western Australia	22°32′24″S 117°16′30″E	
YBGE		Boodge Airstrip	Cowaramup, Western Australia	33°49′43″S 115°05′58″E	
YBGH		Billengarrah Airstrip	Mcarthur, Northern Territory	16°16′58″S 135°43′03″E	
YBGI		Balgair Aerodrome	Rawlinna, Western Australia	31°08′40″S 125°40′01″E	
YBGO	BQW	Balgo Hill Airport	Balgo, Western Australia	20°08′54″S 127°58′24″E	
YBGP		Bogong Park Airstrip	Barnawartha North, Victoria	36°03′17″S 146°42′39″E	Closed
YBGR		Bridgewater Aerodrome	Bridgewater, Victoria	36°37′10″S 143°56′57″E	
YBGT		Budgerygar Airstrip	Jundah, Queensland	25°21′57″S 143°46′57″E	
YBGU		Bulga Underground Heliport	Upper Rouchel, New South Wales	32°04′30″S 151°06′20″E	
YBGY		Biniguy Airstrip	Biniguy, New South Wales	29°30′18″S 150°11′31″E	
YBHB		Bathurst Harbour Airstrip	Melaleuca, Tasmania	43°25′17″S 146°09′44″E	
YBHI	BHQ	Broken Hill Airport	Broken Hill, New South Wales	32°00′06″S 141°28′18″E	
YBHK		Bushy Park Airstrip	Duchess, Queensland	21°15′41″S 139°43′05″E	
YBHL		Bindoon Hill Airstrip	Bindoon, Western Australia	31°20′25″S 116°11′18″E	
YBHM	HTI	Hamilton Island Airport	Hamilton Island, Queensland	20°21′29″S 148°57′06″E	
YBHN		Blenheim Airstrip	Blenheim, Queensland	27°39′12″S 152°18′23″E	
YBIA		Bingara Aerodrome	Bingara, New South Wales	29°48′55″S 150°32′04″E	
YBIC		Bickerton Island Airstrip	Bickerton Island, Northern Territory	13°46′49″S 136°12′03″E	
YBID		Binda Airstrip	Binda, New South Wales	34°18′09″S 149°21′28″E	
YBIE	BEU	Bedourie Airport	Bedourie, Queensland	24°20′46″S 139°27′36″E	
YBIG		Bing Bong Aerodrome	Mcarthur, Northern Territory	15°38′17″S 136°21′30″E	Closed
YBII		Balbirini Airstrip	Mcarthur, Northern Territory	16°43′25″S 135°44′13″E	
YBIK		Billa Kalina Aerodrome	Billa Kalina, South Australia	29°54′52″S 136°11′16″E	Military
YBIL	BIW	Billiluna Airport	Billiluna, Western Australia	19°34′00″S 127°40′01″E	
YBIN		Biggenden Airstrip	Biggenden, Queensland	25°31′17″S 152°02′47″E	
YBIR		Birchip Airport	Birchip, Victoria	35°59′56″S 142°54′47″E	
YBIT		Bullita Airstrip	Gregory, Northern Territory	16°07′11″S 130°25′46″E	
YBIU		Ballidu Aerodrome	Ballidu, Western Australia	30°35′36″S 116°46′48″E	
YBIY		Biranybirany Airstrip	East Arnhem, Northern Territory	12°49′01″S 136°28′19″E	
YBIZ		Bizant Airstrip	Lakefield, Queensland	14°44′25″S 144°07′10″E	
YBJP		Barraratjpi Airstrip	East Arnhem, Northern Territory	13°13′06″S 136°23′30″E	
YBJW		Banjawarn Aerodrome	Lake Darlot, Western Australia	27°40′26″S 121°36′56″E	
YBKA		Banksia Airfield	Stanage, Queensland	22°38′49″S 150°05′24″E	
YBKD		Black Downs Station Airstrip	Arbouin, Queensland	17°02′04″S 143°55′27″E	
YBKE	BRK	Bourke Airport	Bourke, New South Wales	30°02′18″S 145°57′06″E	
YBKL		Bukadal Airstrip	East Arnhem, Northern Territory	12°57′31″S 136°36′02″E	
YBKM		Brockman Airport	Brockman 2 mine, Western Australia	22°23′18″S 117°22′18″E	
YBKS		Barkly Wayside Inn Airstrip	Tablelands, Northern Territory	19°42′14″S 135°48′56″E	
YBKT	BUC	Burketown Airport	Burketown, Queensland	17°44′57″S 139°32′11″E	
YBKU		Barakula Airstrip	Barakula, Queensland	26°26′44″S 150°30′54″E	
YBKW		Burke And Wills Airstrip	Four Ways, Queensland	19°13′16″S 140°21′10″E	
YBLA	BLN	Benalla Airport	Benalla, Victoria	36°33′06″S 146°00′24″E	
YBLB		Billabong Road House Airstrip	Meadow, Western Australia	26°49′17″S 114°36′40″E	
YBLC	LCN	Balcanoona Airport	Balcanoona, South Australia	30°32′06″S 139°20′13″E	
YBLD		Brooklands Aerodrome	Burges, Western Australia	31°49′23″S 116°47′57″E	
YBLE		Biloela Aerodrome	Dakenba, Queensland	24°19′15″S 150°30′35″E	
YBLG		Bollards Lagoon Airstrip	Bollards Lagoon, South Australia	28°58′55″S 140°51′28″E	
YBLH		Bellalie Aerodrome	Eromanga, Queensland	27°00′41″S 142°57′30″E	
YBLI		Bald Hills Airstrip	Clarence Valley, New South Wales	30°19′50″S 152°27′30″E	
YBLL	BLS	Bollon Airport	Bollon, Queensland	28°03′13″S 147°28′42″E	
YBLM		Blinman Aerodrome	Blinman, South Australia	31°07′07″S 138°43′34″E	
YBLN	BQB	Busselton Margaret River Airport	Busselton, Western Australia	33°41′14″S 115°24′01″E	
YBLO		Bullio Airstrip	Bullio, New South Wales	34°21′28″S 150°09′58″E	
YBLP		Bluewater Park Airstrip	Bluewater Park, Queensland	19°11′30″S 146°29′36″E	
YBLS		Black Springs Airstrip	Red Hill, New South Wales	30°27′41″S 150°38′38″E	
YBLT		Ballarat Airport	Ballarat, Victoria	37°30′42″S 143°47′28″E	
YBLU	QBU	Bellevue Airport	Leinster, Western Australia	27°36′46″S 120°35′38″E	
YBLV		Belvoir Park Function Centre Airstrip	Upper Swan, Western Australia	31°47′29″S 116°01′07″E	Closed
YBLW		Bulliwallah Airstrip	Belyando, Queensland	21°37′08″S 146°38′32″E	
YBMA	ISA	Mount Isa Airport	Mount Isa, Queensland	20°39′50″S 139°29′19″E	
YBMD		Bloomfield River Airstrip	Bloomfield, Queensland	15°52′25″S 145°19′48″E	
YBME		Barmedman Airstrip	Barmedman, New South Wales	34°08′38″S 147°19′30″E	Closed
YBMG		Bermagui Dickinson Oval Heliport	Bermagui, New South Wales	36°25′35″S 150°04′34″E	
YBMI		Boomi Airstrip	Boomi, New South Wales	28°43′44″S 149°35′44″E	
YBMK	MKY	Mackay Airport	Mackay, Queensland	21°10′15″S 149°10′57″E	
YBMM		Bamawm Airstrip	Bamawm, Victoria	36°15′00″S 144°37′59″E	Coordinates unverified
YBMR		Barmera Aerodrome	Barmera, South Australia	34°14′05″S 140°28′36″E	
YBMT		Bramston Beach Airstrip	Bramston Beach, Queensland	17°20′31″S 146°00′42″E	
YBMY		Bamyili Airstrip	Barunga, Northern Territory	14°31′11″S 132°52′55″E	
YBNA	BNK	Ballina Byron Gateway Airport	Ballina, New South Wales	28°50′00″S 153°33′42″E	
YBNC		Bannockburn Aerodrome	Torrens Creek, Queensland	21°46′49″S 145°05′02″E	
YBND		Bendick Murrell Airstrip	Bendick Murrell, New South Wales	34°10′27″S 148°28′19″E	
YBNE		Baal Bone Colliery Heliport	Ben Bullen, New South Wales	33°16′11″S 150°03′31″E	
YBNH		Billabong House Heliport	Currumbin Waters, Queensland	28°09′27″S 153°28′53″E	
YBNI		Baniyala Airstrip	East Arnhem, Northern Territory	13°11′56″S 136°13′40″E	
YBNM		Benmara Airstrip	Creswell, Northern Territory	17°55′08″S 136°53′52″E	
YBNP		Barronup Airstrip	Kureen, Queensland	17°20′21″S 145°34′00″E	
YBNR		Browns Range Airstrip	Sturt Creek, Western Australia	18°53′44″S 128°56′31″E	
YBNS	BSJ	Bairnsdale Airport	Bairnsdale, Victoria	37°53′15″S 147°34′04″E	
YBNY		Brunchilly Airstrip	Tablelands, Northern Territory	18°52′10″S 134°29′41″E	
YBOA		Boonah Airstrip	Boonah, Queensland	28°01′03″S 152°40′36″E	
YBOB		Boorabin Airstrip	Victoria Rock, Western Australia	31°12′25″S 120°19′08″E	
YBOC		Booleroo Centre Airstrip	Booleroo Centre, South Australia	32°53′24″S 138°22′00″E	
YBOD		Bodalla Airstrip	Eromanga, Queensland	26°18′05″S 143°23′00″E	
YBOE		Bocrabee Airstrip	Nullagine, Western Australia	22°15′51″S 121°22′21″E	
YBOG		Boggabri Airstrip	Boggabri, New South Wales	30°43′00″S 150°03′00″E	Closed
YBOI	GIC	Boigu Island Airport	Boigu Island, Queensland	09°13′58″S 142°13′06″E	
YBOK	OKY	Oakey Army Aviation Centre	Oakey, Queensland	27°24′41″S 151°44′07″E	
YBOL		Boggabilla Airstrip	Boggabilla, New South Wales	28°37′02″S 150°19′57″E	
YBOM		Bombala Airport	Bombala, New South Wales	36°54′18″S 149°11′00″E	
YBOO		Bindoon Airstrip	Bindoon Army Training Area, Western Australia	31°17′50″S 116°15′50″E	Military
YBOP		Boyup Brook Airstrip	Mayanup, Western Australia	33°53′41″S 116°26′59″E	
YBOR		Bordertown Aerodrome	Cannawigara, South Australia	36°16′18″S 140°43′18″E	
YBOS		Brooking Springs Homestead Airstrip	Wunaamin Miliwundi Ranges, Western Australia	18°06′48″S 125°37′45″E	
YBOT		Boatman Airstrip	Boatman, Queensland	27°16′09″S 146°54′07″E	
YBOU	BQL	Boulia Airport	Boulia, Queensland	22°54′45″S 139°54′03″E	
YBOV		Border Village Aerodrome	Nullarbor, South Australia	31°38′22″S 129°00′43″E	
YBOW		Mount Barrow Heliport	Nunamara, Tasmania	41°22′43″S 147°25′30″E	
YBOY		Booylgoo Springs Airstrip	Sandstone, Western Australia	27°45′03″S 119°54′08″E	
YBPI	BMP	Brampton Island Airport	Brampton Island, Queensland	20°48′17″S 149°16′48″E	
YBPK		Batman Park Heliport	Melbourne, Victoria	37°49′20″S 144°57′24″E	
YBPL		Bullamon Plains Airstrip	Thallon, Queensland	28°34′43″S 148°48′02″E	
YBPN	PPP	Whitsunday Coast Airport	Proserpine, Queensland	20°29′42″S 148°33′06″E	
YBRA		Benambra Airstrip	Benambra, Victoria	36°58′01″S 147°41′57″E	
YBRB		Browse Basin Sea Heliport	Northwest of Browse Island, offshore Western Australia	13°57′09″S 123°18′23″E	
YBRC		Barrow Creek Airstrip	Davenport, Northern Territory	21°32′32″S 133°52′19″E	
YBRD		Bradshaw Airstrip	Bradshaw Field Training Area, Northern Territory	15°20′52″S 130°16′46″E	
YBRE		Bremer Island Airstrip	Bremer Island, Northern Territory	12°05′10″S 136°48′37″E	
YBRG		Balurga Airstrip	Edward River, Queensland	14°56′44″S 142°20′23″E	
YBRI		Berri Airstrip	Monash, South Australia	34°15′41″S 140°35′22″E	
YBRJ		Burren Junction Airstrip	Burren Junction, New South Wales	30°09′32″S 148°58′29″E	
YBRK	ROK	Rockhampton Airport	Rockhampton, Queensland	23°22′54″S 150°28′30″E	
YBRL	BOX	Borroloola Airport	Borroloola, Northern Territory	16°04′05″S 136°18′01″E	
YBRM	BME	Broome International Airport	Broome, Western Australia	17°56′59″S 122°13′40″E	
YBRN	BZD	Balranald Airport	Balranald, New South Wales	34°37′24″S 143°34′42″E	
YBRO		Bruce Rock Airport	Bruce Rock, Western Australia	31°53′15″S 118°06′54″E	
YBRS		Barwon Heads Airport	Barwon Heads, Victoria	38°15′30″S 144°25′36″E	
YBRT		Barratta Homestead Airstrip	Baratta, South Australia	31°57′50″S 139°06′04″E	
YBRU		Brunette Downs Aerodrome	Tablelands, Northern Territory	18°38′15″S 135°56′18″E	
YBRW	BWQ	Brewarrina Airport	Brewarrina, New South Wales	29°58′24″S 146°49′00″E	
YBRY	BYP	Barimunya Airport	Barimunya, Western Australia	22°40′26″S 119°09′58″E	
YBSA		Barossa Sea Heliport	Arafura Sea, offshore Northern Territory	09°49′17″S 130°16′09″E	
YBSF		Beresford Airstrip	Frankfield, Queensland	22°29′32″S 146°56′33″E	Closed
YBSG		RAAF Scherger	Weipa, Queensland	12°37′24″S 142°05′12″E	
YBSM		Blossom Banks Sea Heliport	Coral Sea Islands	19°43′29″S 150°25′29″E	
YBSN		Bessie Springs Airstrip	Mcarthur, Northern Territory	16°39′00″S 135°50′45″E	
YBSO		Bulga Surface Operations Heliport	Mount Thorley, New South Wales	32°40′53″S 151°07′29″E	
YBSP		Bond Springs Airstrip	Burt Plain, Northern Territory	23°31′00″S 133°50′58″E	
YBSR		Blackstone Airstrip	Papulankutja, Western Australia	25°58′59″S 128°16′50″E	
YBSS		Bacchus Marsh Airfield	Bacchus Marsh, Victoria	37°44′00″S 144°25′18″E	
YBST		Billabong Station Airstrip	Back Creek, Bland Shire, New South Wales	33°43′25″S 147°30′22″E	
YBSU	MCY	Sunshine Coast Airport	Marcoola, Sunshine Coast, Queensland	26°36′12″S 153°05′30″E	
YBTC		Beatrice Downs Airstrip	Stonehenge, Barcoo Shire, Queensland	24°11′01″S 142°53′01″E	
YBTD		Brighton Downs Airfield	Longreach, Queensland	23°22′06″S 141°34′45″E	
YBTH	BHS	Bathurst Airport	Bathurst, New South Wales	33°24′36″S 149°39′06″E	
YBTI	BRT	Bathurst Island Airport	Bathurst Island, Northern Territory	11°46′09″S 130°37′11″E	
YBTK		Bentinck Island Airstrip	Bentinck Island, Queensland	17°05′12″S 139°33′57″E	
YBTL	TSV	Townsville Airport / RAAF Townsville (joint use)	Townsville, Queensland	19°15′12″S 146°45′54″E	
YBTN		Barton Siding Airstrip	Yellabinna, South Australia	30°31′29″S 132°40′31″E	
YBTP		Battle Camp Station Airstrip	Basalt, Queensland	19°25′53″S 145°50′55″E	Replacement for YBTS
YBTR	BLT	Blackwater Airport	Blackwater, Queensland	23°36′11″S 148°48′25″E	
YBTS		Battery Downs Airstrip	Basalt, Queensland	19°26′00″S 145°51′00″E	Closed
YBTT		Buttabone Airstrip	Mount Harris, New South Wales	31°22′36″S 147°36′24″E	
YBTU		Bootu Creek Airstrip	Tablelands, Northern Territory	18°42′41″S 134°04′44″E	
YBTV		Batavia Downs Airstrip	Wenlock, Queensland	12°39′31″S 142°40′31″E	
YBTX		Brightlands Airstrip	Kuridala, Queensland	21°04′31″S 140°16′50″E	
YBUA		Bundarra Airstrip	Valkyrie, Queensland	21°57′53″S 148°31′14″E	Closed
YBUC		Butch Airstrip	Metricup, Western Australia	33°48′26″S 115°06′02″E	Closed
YBUD	BDB	Bundaberg Airport	Bundaberg, Queensland	24°54′14″S 152°19′07″E	
YBUG		Bulga Downs Station Aerodrome	Sandstone, Western Australia	28°29′22″S 119°44′49″E	
YBUH		Buckingham Downs Airstrip	Dajarra, Queensland	22°04′23″S 139°45′09″E	
YBUI		Northwest Regional Hospital Heliport	Cooee, Tasmania	41°02′49″S 145°52′50″E	
YBUL		Bulgunnia Aerodrome	Bulgunnia Station, South Australia	30°11′04″S 134°54′19″E	Military
YBUN	BUY	Bunbury Airport	Bunbury, Western Australia	33°22′41″S 115°40′37″E	
YBUO		Bulloo Downs Station Aerodrome	Capricorn, Western Australia	24°01′00″S 119°34′01″E	
YBUP		Bunyip Airfield	Tonimbuk, Victoria	38°00′35″S 145°45′01″E	
YBUR		Burrum Airstrip	East Arnhem, Northern Territory	12°18′39″S 135°57′39″E	
YBUT		Butheroo Station Airstrip	Neilrex, New South Wales	31°45′52″S 149°25′27″E	
YBUU		Bungle Heliport	Purnululu National Park, Western Australia	17°32′40″S 128°18′27″E	
YBUX		Bulleringa Airstrip	Abingdon Downs, Queensland	17°40′57″S 143°49′13″E	Closed
YBUY		Bunyan Aerodrome	Bunyan, New South Wales	36°08′03″S 149°07′55″E	
YBVA		Balaklava Aerodrome	Whitwarta, South Australia	34°05′27″S 138°20′23″E	
YBVE		Bellevue Station Airstrip	Bellevue, Queensland	16°30′47″S 144°11′00″E	
YBVL		Blackville Airstrip	Yarraman, New South Wales	31°35′11″S 150°10′28″E	
YBVR		Beaver Reef Seaplane Base	Coral Sea Islands	17°50′28″S 146°29′16″E	
YBVY		Bullo River Valley Airstrip	Baines, Northern Territory	15°28′00″S 129°46′01″E	
YBWG		Bronzewing Airport	Bronzewing Gold Mine, Western Australia	27°21′56″S 121°02′09″E	
YBWH		Blue Lagoon Airstrip	Aurukun, Queensland	13°45′39″S 141°51′02″E	
YBWI		Burdekin Falls Dam Airstrip	Ravenswood, Queensland	20°35′44″S 147°05′44″E	
YBWK		Bawaka Seaplane Base	East Arnhem, Northern Territory	12°32′00″S 136°45′44″E	
YBWL		Bramwell Station Airstrip	Shelburne, Queensland	12°08′22″S 142°36′52″E	
YBWM	BIP	Bulimba Airport	Bulimba, Queensland	16°52′51″S 143°28′44″E	
YBWN	ZBO	Bowen Airport	Bowen, Queensland	20°01′04″S 148°12′55″E	
YBWO		Bowen Downs Airstrip	Aramac, Queensland	22°27′51″S 144°59′52″E	
YBWP	WEI	Weipa Airport	Weipa, Queensland	12°40′43″S 141°55′31″E	
YBWR	BCK	Bolwarra Airport	Bolwarra, Queensland	17°23′18″S 144°10′08″E	
YBWS		Browse Island Heliport	Browse Island, Western Australia	14°06′38″S 123°32′59″E	
YBWT		Bowthorn Airstrip	Nicholson, Queensland	18°04′41″S 138°16′20″E	
YBWW	WTB	Toowoomba Wellcamp Airport	Wellcamp, Queensland	27°33′30″S 151°47′36″E	
YBWX	BWB	Barrow Island Airport	Barrow Island, Western Australia	20°51′57″S 115°24′17″E	
YBXH		Branxholme Airstrip	Branxholme, Victoria	37°52′02″S 141°42′07″E	Closed
YBXU		Mount Buller Emergency Heliport	Mount Buller, Victoria	37°08′24″S 146°27′20″E	
YBYA		Bryah Airstrip	Peak Hill, Western Australia	25°32′00″S 118°43′59″E	Coordinates unverified
YBYD		Bonney Downs Station Airstrip	Nullagine, Western Australia	22°16′00″S 119°55′35″E	
YBYI		Bruny Island Airport	Bruny Island, Tasmania	43°14′03″S 147°22′48″E	
YBYL		Baryulgil Airstrip	Baryulgil, New South Wales	29°12′59″S 152°36′54″E	
YBYM		Buymarr Airstrip	East Arnhem, Northern Territory	12°41′24″S 136°37′55″E	
YBYN		Brooklyn Airstrip	Mount Carbine, Queensland	16°34′18″S 145°09′21″E	
YBYO		Brymaroo Heliport	Brymaroo, Queensland	27°13′40″S 151°36′48″E	Military
YBYR		Byrock Airstrip	Byrock, New South Wales	30°39′30″S 146°23′41″E	
YBYS	BVZ	Beverley Springs Airport	Beverley Springs, Western Australia	16°43′58″S 125°26′21″E	
YBYU		Bayu Undan Heliport	Timor Sea, offshore Western Australia	11°04′12″S 126°36′48″E	
YBYW		Bayswater Airstrip	Scrubby Creek, Blackall-Tambo Region, Queensland	25°27′00″S 145°34′59″E	Coordinates unverified
YBZA		Breeza Airstrip	Breeza, New South Wales	31°19′00″S 150°31′00″E	Closed

== YC ==
ICAO	IATA	Airport name	Community	Coordinates	Notes
YCAB		Caboolture Airfield	Caboolture, Queensland	27°04′36″S 152°59′12″E	
YCAC		Cattle Creek Airstrip	Gurindji, Northern Territory	17°36′25″S 131°32′56″E	
YCAE		Campbell Town Airfield	Campbell Town, Tasmania	41°58′02″S 147°31′50″E	
YCAG	CGV	Caiguna Airport	Caiguna, Western Australia	32°16′49″S 125°28′40″E	
YCAH	CLH	Coolah Airport	Coolah, New South Wales	31°46′24″S 149°36′36″E	
YCAI		Callion Airstrip	Ularring, Western Australia	30°07′13″S 120°34′17″E	
YCAJ		Cadjebut Airstrip	St George Ranges, Western Australia	18°41′38″S 125°53′35″E	
YCAL		Castlemaine (Guildford) Aerodrome	Yapeen, Victoria	37°08′03″S 144°09′30″E	
YCAM		Cannington Station Airstrip	McKinlay, Queensland	21°53′20″S 140°54′51″E	
YCAN		Cannon Hill Community Airstrip	Kakadu National Park, Northern Territory	12°21′18″S 132°56′42″E	
YCAP		Capel Aerodrome	Capel, Western Australia	33°35′43″S 115°34′18″E	
YCAR	CVQ	Carnarvon Airport	Carnarvon, Western Australia	24°52′50″S 113°40′20″E	
YCAS	CSI	Casino Airport	Casino, New South Wales	28°52′58″S 153°04′01″E	
YCAV		Caravonica Heliport	Smithfield, Queensland	16°51′00″S 145°41′38″E	
YCAW		Cambewarra Airstrip	Badagarang, New South Wales	34°49′52″S 150°34′44″E	
YCAX		Carrara Heliport	Benowa, Queensland	28°00′00″S 153°22′00″E	Coordinates unverified
YCBA	CAZ	Cobar Airport	Cobar, New South Wales	31°32′18″S 145°47′36″E	
YCBB	COJ	Coonabarabran Airport	Coonabarabran, New South Wales	31°19′57″S 149°16′02″E	
YCBC		Come By Chance Airstrip	Come By Chance, New South Wales	30°20′13″S 148°28′12″E	
YCBE	CBY	Canobie Airport	Canobie Station, Queensland	19°28′46″S 140°55′37″E	
YCBG		Cambridge Aerodrome	Cambridge, Tasmania	42°49′36″S 147°28′30″E	
YCBH		Cairns Hospital Heliport	Cairns North, Queensland	16°54′41″S 145°46′08″E	
YCBL		Camballin Airstrip	Camballin, Western Australia	17°59′10″S 124°09′52″E	
YCBM		Cobram Heliport	Cobram, Victoria	35°55′11″S 145°38′54″E	Coordinates unverified
YCBN	CBI	Cape Barren Island Airport	Cape Barren Island	40°23′30″S 148°01′01″E	
YCBO		Cape Borda Airstrip	Cape Borda, South Australia	35°45′24″S 136°35′53″E	Closed
YCBP	CPD	Coober Pedy Airport	Coober Pedy, South Australia	29°02′24″S 134°43′18″E	
YCBR	CRB	Collarenebri Airport	Collarenebri, New South Wales	29°31′18″S 148°34′54″E	
YCBS		Cooneybar Airstrip	Tindarey, New South Wales	30°57′06″S 146°18′49″E	
YCBY		Cow Bay Heliport	Diwan, Queensland	16°12′08″S 145°24′14″E	
YCCA	CCL	Chinchilla Airport	Chinchilla, Queensland	26°46′16″S 150°37′00″E	
YCCF		Cape Crawford Airstrip	McArthur, Northern Territory	16°41′16″S 135°43′48″E	
YCCK		Canteen Creek Airstrip	Costello, Northern Territory	20°39′03″S 135°35′06″E	Closed
YCCR		Coomalie Creek Airfield	Coomalie Creek, Northern Territory	13°00′36″S 131°07′49″E	
YCCT	CNC	Coconut Island Airport	Coconut Island, Queensland	10°03′01″S 143°04′17″E	
YCCY	CNJ	Cloncurry Airport	Cloncurry, Queensland	20°39′55″S 140°30′23″E	
YCDA		Cardowan Airstrip	Lotus Creek, Queensland	22°06′58″S 149°03′38″E	
YCDB		Coondambo Aerodrome	Coondambo, South Australia	31°03′12″S 135°51′52″E	
YCDE		Cobden Airport	Cobden, Victoria	38°19′36″S 143°03′24″E	
YCDH		Cadney Homestead Airstrip	Wintinna, South Australia	27°54′24″S 134°03′21″E	
YCDO	CBX	Condobolin Airport	Condobolin, New South Wales	33°03′54″S 147°12′30″E	
YCDP		Charles Darwin Heliport	Charles Darwin, Northern Territory	12°26′33″S 130°52′41″E	
YCDR	CUD	Caloundra Airport	Caloundra West, Queensland	26°48′06″S 153°06′18″E	
YCDS		Childers Airstrip	South Isis, Queensland	25°15′11″S 152°20′07″E	
YCDT		Carandotta Aerodrome	Carandotta Station, Queensland	21°58′14″S 138°36′35″E	
YCDU	CED	Ceduna Airport	Ceduna, South Australia	32°07′50″S 133°42′35″E	
YCDV		Caldervale Station Aerodrome	Caldervale, Queensland	25°06′30″S 146°49′59″E	
YCDW		Cardwell/Dallachy Airstrip	Kennedy, Queensland	18°10′42″S 145°57′00″E	
YCED		Cedars Park Airstrip	Banana, Queensland	24°35′01″S 150°11′42″E	
YCEE	CVC	Cleve Airport	Cleve, South Australia	33°42′36″S 136°30′18″E	
YCEL		Capella Airstrip	Capella, Queensland	23°05′43″S 148°00′26″E	
YCEM		Coldstream Airport	Coldstream, Victoria	37°43′42″S 145°24′30″E	
YCES		Ceres Airstrip	Ceres, Victoria	38°08′46″S 144°15′42″E	Curved runway
YCFD	CFI	Camfield Station Airport	Camfield Station, Northern Territory	17°01′18″S 131°19′37″E	
YCFE		Corfield Airstrip	Corfield, Queensland	21°42′48″S 143°23′01″E	
YCFF		Dadswells Bridge Airstrip	Dadswells Bridge, Victoria	36°55′30″S 142°30′17″E	Closed
YCFH	CFH	Clifton Hills Landing Strip	Clifton Hills, South Australia	27°00′55″S 138°53′31″E	
YCFL		Cape Flattery Airport	Hope Vale, Queensland	14°58′15″S 145°18′42″E	
YCFN		Clifton Airstrip	Ryeford, Queensland	27°55′40″S 151°50′51″E	
YCFS	CFS	Coffs Harbour Airport	Coffs Harbour, New South Wales	30°19′12″S 153°07′00″E	Formerly YSCH
YCGA		Canungra Airstrip	Boyland, Queensland	27°56′09″S 153°07′00″E	Closed
YCGH		Clonagh Airstrip	Three Rivers, Queensland	20°08′02″S 140°41′13″E	
YCGI		Carnegie Station Aerodrome	Lake Carnegie, Western Australia	25°47′51″S 122°56′32″E	
YCGL		Cungelella Airstrip	Mantuan Downs, Queensland	24°41′07″S 147°09′25″E	
YCGO	LLG	Chillagoe Airport	Chillagoe, Queensland	17°08′14″S 144°31′43″E	
YCGP		Cottage Point Seaplane Base	Cottage Point, New South Wales	33°36′50″S 151°12′15″E	
YCGR		Challenger Mine Airstrip	Commonwealth Hill, South Australia	29°52′20″S 133°34′25″E	Military
YCHA		Charlotte Plains Airstrip	Dutton River, Queensland	20°25′57″S 143°51′10″E	
YCHB		Cherrabah Homestead Resort Airstrip	Elbow Valley, Queensland	28°25′48″S 152°05′20″E	
YCHD		Chadwick Airstrip	Nullarbor, South Australia	31°34′23″S 130°10′08″E	Road airstrip
YCHE		Cashmere Downs Station Airstrip	Sandstone, Western Australia	28°57′05″S 119°34′16″E	
YCHI		Cape Shield (Djarrakpi) Airstrip	East Arnhem, Northern Territory	13°17′16″S 136°21′17″E	
YCHK	CKW	Graeme Rowley Aerodrome	Christmas Creek mine, Western Australia	22°21′15″S 119°38′40″E	
YCHL		Charlton Airstrip	Charlton, Victoria	36°17′25″S 143°19′52″E	
YCHP		Yanchep Airstrip	Yanchep, Western Australia	31°33′05″S 115°39′22″E	Closed
YCHQ		Chesterfield Airstrip	Mount Coolon, Queensland	21°36′29″S 147°36′23″E	
YCHR		Childra Airstrip	Lake Everard, South Australia	31°41′29″S 134°48′00″E	Closed
YCHS		Cheviot Hills Airstrip	Porcupine, Queensland	19°39′05″S 144°08′35″E	
YCHT	CXT	Charters Towers Airport	Charters Towers, Queensland	20°02′38″S 146°16′24″E	
YCHU		Chuulangun Airstrip	Lockhart River, Queensland	13°07′06″S 143°00′18″E	
YCHY		Cherrydale Airstrip	Bylong, New South Wales	32°25′31″S 150°04′49″E	
YCIG		Corrigin Aerodrome	Corrigin, Western Australia	32°20′17″S 117°49′39″E	
YCII		Collins Island Airstrip	Stanage, Queensland	22°14′21″S 150°18′07″E	
YCIL		Carlton Hill Airstrip	Cambridge Gulf, Western Australia	15°30′09″S 128°32′06″E	
YCIN	DCN	RAAF Curtin	Derby, Western Australia	17°34′53″S 123°49′42″E	
YCIP		Craig's Pocket Airstrip	Greenvale, Queensland	18°33′58″S 145°00′31″E	
YCJU		Conjuboy Airstrip	Conjuboy, Queensland	18°41′07″S 144°44′54″E	
YCKA		Curdimurka Airstrip	Stuarts Creek, South Australia	29°28′36″S 137°05′17″E	
YCKD		Clarke Island Aerodrome	Clarke Island, Tasmania	40°31′07″S 148°07′33″E	
YCKI	CKI	Croker Island Airport	Croker Island, Northern Territory	11°09′54″S 132°29′00″E	
YCKN	CTN	Cooktown Airport	Cooktown, Queensland	15°26′41″S 145°11′04″E	
YCKY		Cocklebiddy Airstrip	Cocklebiddy, Western Australia	32°02′34″S 126°05′28″E	
YCLA		Clare Station Airstrip	Clare, Balranald Shire, New South Wales	33°24′25″S 143°56′24″E	
YCLB		Claremont Airbase	Brukunga, South Australia	34°59′31″S 138°55′37″E	
YCLC		Colac Cricket Ground Heliport	Colac, Victoria	38°20′03″S 143°34′59″E	
YCLE		Callendale Airstrip	Coles, South Australia	37°14′36″S 140°26′42″E	Closed
YCLG		Coolgardie Airstrip	Mount Burges, Western Australia	30°53′50″S 121°11′42″E	
YCLH		Coolullah Airstrip	Three Rivers, Queensland	19°49′05″S 140°09′48″E	
YCLI		Coolibah Airstrip	Eromanga, Queensland	26°20′07″S 142°34′52″E	
YCLM		Collymongle Aerodrome	Collarenebri, New South Wales	29°28′42″S 148°47′11″E	
YCLN		Charlie One Sea Heliport	Dampier Marine Park, Western Australia	20°25′12″S 117°24′42″E	
YCLO		Cowl Cowl Airstrip	Hillston, New South Wales	33°36′21″S 145°18′48″E	
YCLQ		Cape Leveque Airstrip	Dampier Peninsula, Western Australia	16°24′02″S 122°55′53″E	
YCLR		Clarendon Airstrip	Blackall, Queensland	24°15′11″S 145°13′25″E	
YCLS		Colonsay Airstrip	West Prairie, Queensland	27°28′53″S 151°23′08″E	
YCLT		Collector Airstrip	Collector, New South Wales	34°53′00″S 149°25′01″E	Closed
YCLV		Claravale Airstrip	Claravale, Northern Territory	14°21′24″S 131°35′02″E	Closed
YCLW		Chilla Well Airstrip	Chilla Well, Northern Territory	21°29′59″S 130°57′42″E	
YCLY		Coleambally Airstrip	Coleambally, New South Wales	34°48′08″S 145°50′48″E	
YCMA		Connemara Airstrip	Stonehenge, Barcoo Shire, Queensland	24°13′13″S 142°16′17″E	
YCMB		Cambooya Airstrip	Cambooya, Queensland	27°43′12″S 151°52′24″E	
YCMC		Commanche Airstrip	Glenroy, Queensland	23°19′43″S 149°52′35″E	
YCMD		Commodore Airstrip	Flinders Ranges, South Australia	31°13′59″S 138°23′06″E	
YCMH		Camden Haven Airstrip	Camden Haven, New South Wales	31°39′54″S 152°44′30″E	
YCMK		Camel Creek Airstrip	Valley of Lagoons, Queensland	18°51′28″S 145°28′35″E	
YCMM		Cummins Town Airstrip	Cummins, South Australia	34°15′10″S 135°42′48″E	
YCMT	CMQ	Clermont Airport	Clermont, Queensland	22°46′19″S 147°37′07″E	
YCMU	CMA	Cunnamulla Airport	Cunnamulla, Queensland	28°01′48″S 145°37′20″E	
YCMW	CML	Camooweal Airport	Camooweal, Queensland	19°54′50″S 138°07′27″E	
YCNA		Corona Station Airstrip	Corona Station, New South Wales	31°17′27″S 141°27′07″E	
YCNF	NIF	Nifty Airport	Nifty Copper Mine, Western Australia	21°40′25″S 121°35′41″E	
YCNG		Cooranga Aerodrome	Woolumbool, South Australia	36°49′12″S 140°16′23″E	
YCNH		Carnarmah Aerodrome	Carnamah, Western Australia	29°41′01″S 115°53′37″E	
YCNK	CES	Cessnock Airport	Cessnock, New South Wales	32°47′18″S 151°20′30″E	
YCNM	CNB	Coonamble Airport	Coonamble, New South Wales	30°59′00″S 148°22′30″E	
YCNN		Coonana Airstrip	Cundeelee, Western Australia	31°01′42″S 123°09′24″E	
YCNO		Conargo Airstrip	Conargo, New South Wales	35°18′50″S 145°06′22″E	
YCNP		Channel Point Airstrip	Rakula, Northern Territory	13°09′09″S 130°08′36″E	
YCNQ		Coonawarra Airstrip	Coonawarra, South Australia	37°16′38″S 140°48′42″E	
YCNR		Cann River Airstrip	Noorinbee, Victoria	37°30′11″S 149°10′03″E	
YCNS		Coniston Airstrip	Anmatjere, Northern Territory	22°08′00″S 132°31′59″E	Closed
YCNT		Crows Nest Heliport	Crows Nest, Queensland	27°15′54″S 152°03′31″E	
YCNW		Conway Airstrip	Mount Coolon, Queensland	20°58′25″S 147°23′12″E	
YCNX		Cooranga Airstrip	Yetman, New South Wales	29°05′43″S 150°46′33″E	
YCNY		Century Mine Airstrip	Lawn Hill, Queensland	18°45′36″S 138°42′37″E	
YCOA		Coalling East Airstrip	Williams, Western Australia	32°55′45″S 116°54′20″E	
YCOB		Cooranbong Airport	Cooranbong, New South Wales	33°03′44″S 151°27′20″E	Closed
YCOD	ODL	Cordillo Downs Airport	Cordillo Downs, South Australia	26°44′43″S 140°38′17″E	
YCOE	CUQ	Coen Airport	Coen, Queensland	13°45′43″S 143°07′00″E	
YCOF		Coffin Bay Aerodrome	Kellidie Bay, South Australia	34°35′20″S 135°30′18″E	
YCOG		Coongan Airstrip	Marble Bar, Western Australia	20°40′57″S 119°39′53″E	Closed
YCOH		Cohuna Airport	Cohuna, Victoria	35°49′37″S 144°12′50″E	
YCOI	CIE	Collie Airfield	Collie, Western Australia	33°21′35″S 116°12′03″E	
YCOL		Coleraine Airstrip	Coleraine, Victoria	37°36′00″S 141°42′00″E	Closed
YCOM	OOM	Cooma–Snowy Mountains Airport	Cooma, New South Wales	36°18′00″S 148°58′24″E	
YCON		Cone Bay Seaplane Base	Alcatraz Island, Western Australia	36°18′00″S 148°58′24″E	
YCOO	CDA	Cooinda Airport	Cooinda, Queensland	12°54′10″S 132°31′56″E	
YCOP		Copmanhurst Oval Heliport	Copmanhurst, New South Wales	29°35′21″S 152°46′23″E	
YCOR	CWW	Corowa Airport	Corowa, New South Wales	35°59′24″S 146°21′06″E	
YCOS		Cosmo Newbery Aerodrome	Cosmo Newbery, Western Australia	27°59′09″S 122°54′17″E	
YCOT		Cormorant Airstrip	Dotswood, Queensland	19°31′51″S 146°20′20″E	Military
YCOV		Couran Cove Resort Heliport	South Stradbroke Island, Queensland	27°49′26″S 153°24′33″E	
YCOW		Cowan Downs Airstrip	Stokes, Queensland	18°58′02″S 140°31′45″E	
YCOY		Coral Bay Airstrip	Lynton, Western Australia	23°07′44″S 113°46′50″E	
YCPC		Cape Capricorn Seaplane Base	Curtis Island, Queensland	23°29′47″S 151°14′06″E	
YCPD		Cape Don Airstrip	Cobourg Peninsula, Northern Territory	11°17′54″S 131°49′37″E	
YCPH		Copper Hills Airstrip	Evelyn Downs, South Australia	27°56′58″S 134°20′09″E	
YCPI		Cheepie Airstrip	Adavale, Queensland	26°37′27″S 145°00′49″E	
YCPK		Coombing Park Airstrip	Carcoar, New South Wales	33°37′43″S 149°07′29″E	
YCPL		Cape Lambert Heliport	Point Samson, Western Australia	20°36′21″S 117°09′53″E	
YCPN		Carpentaria Downs Airstrip	Einasleigh, Queensland	18°43′07″S 144°18′47″E	
YCPP		Copper Triangle Airstrip	Kadina, South Australia	33°58′54″S 137°39′43″E	Closed
YCPR		Cape Preston Airport	Mardie, Western Australia	20°58′38″S 116°16′30″E	
YCPS		Canopus Park Airstrip	Orion, Queensland	24°17′45″S 148°21′49″E	
YCPT		Carrapateena Airport	Carrapateena mine, South Australia	31°18′30″S 137°26′36″E	
YCPW		Cape Keer-Weer Airstrip	Aurukun, Queensland	13°50′24″S 141°28′59″E	
YCPX		Middle Point Research Station Airstrip	Middle Point, Northern Territory	12°35′11″S 131°18′32″E	
YCRA		Carinda Airstrip	Carinda, New South Wales	30°27′30″S 147°42′29″E	
YCRB		Coorabie Airstrip	Coorabie, South Australia	31°53′17″S 132°17′05″E	
YCRD		Currandooley Airstrip	Queanbeyan-Palerang Region, New South Wales	35°11′04″S 149°29′08″E	
YCRE		Cressy Aerodrome	Cressy, Victoria	38°02′24″S 143°39′11″E	
YCRF		Westbury/Crofton Farm Airstrip	Westbury, Tasmania	41°28′04″S 146°50′18″E	
YCRG	CYG	Corryong Airport	Corryong, Victoria	36°10′58″S 147°53′16″E	
YCRK	CXQ	Christmas Creek Airport	Christmas Creek Station, Western Australia	18°52′19″S 125°56′04″E	
YCRL		Crookwell Airstrip	Crookwell, New South Wales	34°29′59″S 149°27′39″E	
YCRM		Cradle Mountain Heliport	Cradle Mountain, Tasmania	41°34′39″S 145°56′29″E	Formerly YCDL
YCRN		Cranbourn Airfield	Mount Direction, Tasmania	41°09′41″S 147°00′53″E	
YCRO		Crown Towers Heliport	Burswood, Western Australia	31°57′44″S 115°53′42″E	Closed
YCRP		Corella Park Airstrip	Cloncurry, Queensland	20°35′50″S 140°14′39″E	
YCRS		Carina Downs Airstrip	Orion, Queensland	24°14′07″S 148°28′32″E	
YCRT		Carrieton Airstrip	Carrieton, South Australia	32°24′19″S 138°31′10″E	
YCRX		Crux Platform Heliport	Timor Sea, offshore Western Australia	12°57′50″S 124°26′32″E	
YCRY	CDQ	Croydon Airport	Croydon, Queensland	18°13′03″S 142°15′11″E	
YCSA		Compressor Station 3 Airstrip	Lyndon, Western Australia	23°39′18″S 115°08′53″E	
YCSB		Compressor Station 5 Airstrip	Yalardy, Western Australia	26°05′09″S 115°13′13″E	
YCSC		Compressor Station 6 Airstrip	Coolcalalaya, Western Australia	27°20′55″S 115°10′29″E	
YCSD		Compressor Station 1 Airstrip	Mardie, Western Australia	21°26′38″S 115°56′48″E	
YCSE		Compressor Station 2 Airstrip	Nanutarra, Western Australia	22°28′07″S 115°14′56″E	
YCSF		Compressor Station 4 Airstrip	Gascoyne River, Western Australia	24°50′34″S 115°17′12″E	
YCSI		Cassilis Airstrip	Cassilis, New South Wales	32°00′08″S 149°57′40″E	
YCSL		Consuelo Airstrip	Consuelo, Queensland	24°39′08″S 148°28′11″E	
YCSM		Crossmore Airstrip	Muttaburra, Queensland	22°53′46″S 144°35′51″E	
YCSP		Curtin Springs Airstrip	Petermann, Northern Territory	25°20′02″S 131°45′34″E	
YCST		Carcuma Airstrip	Parrakie, South Australia	35°37′42″S 140°12′17″E	
YCSV	KCE	Collinsville Airport	Collinsville, Queensland	20°35′46″S 147°51′36″E	
YCSW		Camp Engstrom Woolshed Airstrip	Hervey Range, Queensland	19°25′07″S 146°32′30″E	Military
YCTA		Coolatai Aerodrome	Coolatai, New South Wales	29°08′39″S 150°43′29″E	
YCTB		Cape Tribulation Seaplane Base	Cape Tribulation, Queensland	16°04′51″S 145°28′22″E	
YCTC		Cotten Creek Airstrip	Telfer, Western Australia	22°49′06″S 122°35′05″E	
YCTH		Chatsworth Airstrip	Selwyn, Queensland	21°57′21″S 140°17′25″E	
YCTI		Cockatoo Island Airstrip	Cockatoo Island, Western Australia	16°05′45″S 123°36′41″E	
YCTM	CMD	Cootamundra Airport	Cootamundra, New South Wales	34°37′30″S 148°02′06″E	
YCTN		Casterton Aerodrome	Casterton, Victoria	37°36′48″S 141°21′42″E	
YCTO		Callington Airfield	Callington, South Australia	35°06′21″S 139°03′17″E	
YCTP		Coen Town Airstrip	Coen, Queensland	13°57′23″S 143°10′55″E	
YCTS		Calton Hills Airstrip	Gunpowder, Queensland	20°09′02″S 139°24′28″E	
YCTW		Cork Tree Well Airstrip	Bandya Station, Western Australia	28°19′16″S 122°24′21″E	
YCTY		Cape Otway Seaplane Base	Cape Otway, Victoria	38°51′36″S 143°30′54″E	
YCUA	CUG	Cudal Airport	Cudal, New South Wales	33°16′33″S 148°46′09″E	Closed
YCUD		Cuddapan Aerodrome	Farrars Creek, Queensland	25°36′00″S 141°30′30″E	
YCUE	CUY	Cue Airport	Cue, Western Australia	27°26′48″S 117°55′06″E	
YCUL		Cungulla Heliport	Cape Cleveland, Queensland	19°23′47″S 147°06′24″E	
YCUM		Cumberland Airstrip	Barcaldine, Queensland	23°34′31″S 144°55′27″E	
YCUN		Cunderdin Airport	Cunderdin, Western Australia	31°37′20″S 117°13′00″E	
YCUR		Cabramurra Airstrip	Cabramurra, New South Wales	35°55′37″S 148°23′33″E	
YCUS		Cummins Airstrip	Cummins, South Australia	34°12′55″S 135°38′04″E	
YCUT		Cuthero Airstrip	Scotia, New South Wales	32°57′34″S 142°03′20″E	
YCUW		Currawilla Homestead Airstrip	Farrars Creek, Queensland	25°09′15″S 141°20′31″E	
YCVA		Clare Valley Aerodrome	Hilltown, South Australia	33°42′45″S 138°35′06″E	
YCVB		Victoria Barracks Heliport	Paddington, New South Wales	33°53′07″S 151°13′24″E	
YCVD		Cleveden Airstrip	South Gundagai, New South Wales	35°09′38″S 148°12′44″E	
YCVG		Calvin Grove Airstrip	Virginia, South Australia	34°41′32″S 138°34′51″E	
YCVH		Calvert Hills Airstrip	Calvert, Northern Territory	17°12′27″S 137°21′10″E	
YCVK		Cravens Peak Airstrip	Sturt, Queensland	23°18′33″S 138°34′38″E	
YCVM		Caversham Airstrip	Brabham, Western Australia	31°50′07″S 115°58′29″E	Closed
YCVS		Cervantes Airstrip	Cervantes, Western Australia	30°29′07″S 115°05′08″E	
YCWA	CJF	Coondewanna Airport	Coondewanna, Western Australia	22°58′00″S 118°48′08″E	
YCWC		Connellans Wildman Lagoon Camp Airstrip	Point Stuart, Northern Territory	12°39′17″S 131°42′47″E	
YCWD	CSD	Cresswell Downs Airstrip	Creswell, Northern Territory	17°56′53″S 135°54′58″E	
YCWE		Cape Wessels Airstrip	Rimbija Island, East Arnhem, Northern Territory	11°00′11″S 136°45′34″E	
YCWG		Coast Watcher Heights Airstrip	Trinity Beach, Queensland	16°47′54″S 145°41′28″E	Closed
YCWH		Commonwealth Hill Aerodrome	Commonwealth Hill, South Australia	29°57′26″S 134°09′06″E	Military
YCWI	CWR	Cowarie Airport	Cowarie Station, South Australia	27°42′45″S 138°19′41″E	
YCWL	CCW	Cowell Airport	Cowell, South Australia	33°40′00″S 136°53′30″E	
YCWN		Corowa Downs Airstrip	Eromanga, Queensland	26°27′41″S 143°22′16″E	
YCWO		Chatsworth Aerodrome	Chatsworth, Victoria	37°51′10″S 142°37′16″E	
YCWR	CWT	Cowra Airport	Cowra, New South Wales	33°50′41″S 148°38′56″E	
YCWS		Cowes Airstrip	Ventnor, Victoria	38°30′28″S 145°12′59″E	Closed
YCWW		Canowindra Airstrip	Canowindra, New South Wales	33°32′34″S 148°39′47″E	
YCWY	COY	Coolawanyah Station Airport	Coolawanyah Station, Western Australia	21°47′39″S 117°45′33″E	
YCXA		Cooloola Village Airstrip	Cooloola Cove, Queensland	25°58′38″S 153°00′14″E	
YCXR		Cox River Airstrip	Arnold, Northern Territory	15°52′05″S 134°33′33″E	Closed
YCYE		Coyote Mine Airstrip	Tanami, Western Australia	19°53′35″S 128°52′22″E	
YCYG		Cygnet Bay Airstrip	Dampier Peninsula, Western Australia	16°26′22″S 123°00′59″E	
YCYH		Calwynyardah Aerodrome	Mount Hardman, Western Australia	17°59′50″S 124°43′22″E	
YCYN		Coonalpyn Heliport	Coonalpyn, South Australia	35°41′31″S 139°51′18″E	
YCYR		Charnley River Airstrip	Wunaamin Miliwundi Ranges, Western Australia	16°44′00″S 125°26′21″E	
YCYT		Crystal Brook Airstrip	Crystal Brook, Queensland	17°22′49″S 144°27′01″E	
YCYV		Crystal Vale Airstrip	Yarraden, Queensland	14°04′49″S 142°59′42″E	

== YD ==
ICAO	IATA	Airport name	Community	Coordinates	Notes
YDAG		Dagworth Airstrip	Abingdon Downs, Queensland	17°56′26″S 143°35′42″E	
YDAI		Dauan Island Heliport	Dauan Island, Queensland	09°25′03″S 142°31′49″E	
YDAJ		Dajarra Airport	Dajarra, Queensland	21°42′30″S 139°31′59″E	
YDAL		Dalgonally Airstrip	Taldora, Queensland	20°07′26″S 141°18′51″E	
YDAM		Damper Creek Heliport	Damper Creek, Queensland	18°20′15″S 146°02′54″E	
YDAR		Darlington Airstrip	Maria Island, Tasmania	42°34′19″S 148°04′15″E	
YDAY	DBY	Dalby Airport	Dalby, Queensland	27°09′18″S 151°16′01″E	
YDBG		Dalbeg Airstrip	Bogie, Queensland	20°15′32″S 147°19′28″E	
YDBI	DRN	Dirranbandi Airport	Dirranbandi, Queensland	28°35′11″S 148°13′04″E	
YDBL		Denabling Airstrip	Minigin, Western Australia	32°56′33″S 116°59′00″E	Closed
YDBR	DNB	Dunbar Airport	Dunbar Station, Queensland	16°02′52″S 142°23′41″E	
YDBY	DRB	Derby Airport	Derby, Western Australia	17°22′12″S 123°39′38″E	
YDDF	DFP	Drumduff Airport	Drumduff, Queensland	16°03′08″S 143°00′48″E	
YDDI		Daydream Island Heliport	Daydream Island, Queensland	20°15′37″S 148°48′49″E	
YDDP		Dundee Park Airstrip	Boatman, Queensland	27°19′07″S 147°00′52″E	
YDDY		Douglas-Daly Airstrip	Douglas-Daly, Northern Territory	13°50′07″S 131°11′09″E	
YDEA		Delara Airstrip	Gulung Mardrulk, Northern Territory	13°40′07″S 134°17′28″E	
YDEG		Delegate Airstrip	Delegate, New South Wales	37°03′41″S 148°56′31″E	
YDEK		Denmark Airport	Hay, Western Australia	34°56′43″S 117°23′46″E	
YDEL		Deloraine (Westhorpe) Airstrip	Deloraine, Tasmania	41°31′11″S 146°38′01″E	Closed
YDEN		Denman Airstrip	Denman, New South Wales	32°22′40″S 150°37′02″E	
YDER		Derrinallum Airstrip	Derrinallum, Victoria	37°56′03″S 143°13′40″E	
YDEV		Devoncourt Airstrip	Kuridala, Queensland	21°12′44″S 140°14′07″E	
YDFD		Dexfield Park Airstrip	Wauchope, New South Wales	31°25′18″S 152°45′30″E	
YDGA	DGD	Dalgaranga Gold Mine Airport	Daggar Hills, Western Australia	27°49′47″S 117°18′59″E	
YDGI		Dullingari Airstrip	Innamincka, South Australia	28°07′52″S 140°52′52″E	
YDGN		Doongan Airstrip	Drysdale River, Western Australia	15°23′11″S 126°18′08″E	
YDGR		Dalgaranga Airstrip	Yalgoo, Western Australia	27°47′29″S 116°59′36″E	
YDGT		Dalgety Downs Station Aerodrome	Gascoyne River, Western Australia	25°16′03″S 116°13′17″E	
YDGU		DeGrussa Airport	Kumarina, Western Australia	25°33′27″S 119°17′15″E	
YDGY		De Grey Homestead Airstrip	De Grey, Western Australia	20°10′54″S 119°11′52″E	
YDHA		Dhaniya Seaplane Base	East Arnhem, Northern Territory	12°32′52″S 136°44′20″E	
YDHD		Dirk Hartog Island Airstrip	Dirk Hartog Island, Western Australia	25°53′42″S 113°06′24″E	Closed
YDHI		Dhipirri Airstrip	East Arnhem, Northern Territory	12°15′07″S 135°05′46″E	
YDHJ		Dhoyndji Airstrip	East Arnhem, Northern Territory	12°53′20″S 135°28′02″E	
YDHL		Dhalinbuy Airstrip	East Arnhem, Northern Territory	12°24′47″S 136°23′12″E	
YDHM		Denham Seaplane Base	Denham, Western Australia	25°55′54″S 113°32′06″E	
YDHP		Dhuruputjpi Airstrip	East Arnhem, Northern Territory	13°03′12″S 136°10′18″E	
YDIG		Dig Tree Airstrip	Durham, Queensland	27°37′09″S 141°04′24″E	
YDII		Dum In Mirrie Island Airstrip	Bynoe Harbour, Northern Territory	12°37′57″S 130°22′18″E	
YDIM		Dimbulah Airstrip	Dimbulah, Queensland	17°07′43″S 145°05′45″E	
YDIN		Dinah Island Airstrip	Yagoonya, Queensland	16°22′24″S 141°29′37″E	
YDIX	DXD	Dixie Airport	Dixie, Queensland	15°07′03″S 143°18′58″E	
YDKE		Drake Oval Heliport	Drake Village, New South Wales	28°55′33″S 152°22′34″E	
YDKG		Duketon Gold Airport	Bandya Station, Western Australia	27°36′06″S 122°20′08″E	
YDKH		Dalkeith Airstrip	Longreach, Queensland	23°30′51″S 143°11′25″E	
YDKI	DKI	Dunk Island Airport	Dunk Island, Australia	17°56′15″S 146°08′25″E	
YDKL		Docklands Heliport	Docklands, Victoria	17°56′15″S 146°08′25″E	
YDLC		Dulacca Airstrip	Dulacca, Queensland	26°38′32″S 149°43′48″E	
YDLD		Delmore Downs Airstrip	Sandover, Northern Territory	22°27′31″S 134°53′02″E	
YDLG		Dooloogarah Airstrip	Upper Warrego, Queensland	24°53′11″S 147°47′31″E	
YDLH		Dalhousie Airstrip	Witjira, South Australia	26°25′22″S 135°30′34″E	
YDLI		Deal Island Heliport	Deal Island, Tasmania	39°28′33″S 147°18′52″E	
YDLK	DLK	Dulkaninna Airport	Dulkaninna, South Australia	29°01′24″S 138°28′49″E	
YDLL		Dunolly Airstrip	Dunolly, Victoria	36°51′00″S 143°42′00″E	Coordinates unverified
YDLN		Drumlion Airstrip	Longreach, Queensland	22°34′33″S 143°39′56″E	
YDLO		Darlot Airport	Darlot-Centenary Gold Mine, Western Australia	27°52′25″S 121°16′18″E	
YDLQ	DNQ	Deniliquin Airport	Deniliquin, New South Wales	35°33′17″S 144°56′57″E	
YDLR		Deloraine Island Sea Heliport	Deloraine Island, Queensland	20°09′17″S 149°04′20″E	
YDLT	DDN	Delta Downs Airport	Delta Downs Station, Queensland	16°59′30″S 141°19′00″E	
YDLV	DLV	Delissaville Airport	Belyuen, Northern Territory	12°33′04″S 130°41′12″E	
YDLW	DYW	Daly Waters Airfield	Daly Waters, Northern Territory	16°15′42″S 133°22′50″E	Military
YDMB		Dimboola Heliport	Dimboola, Victoria	36°27′00″S 142°02′00″E	
YDME		Mount Dimer Airstrip	Lake Deborah, Western Australia	30°24′06″S 119°49′48″E	
YDMF		Diemal Find Airstrip	Ularring, Western Australia	29°40′03″S 119°17′32″E	
YDMG	DMD	Doomadgee Airport	Doomadgee, Queensland	17°56′24″S 138°49′18″E	
YDMN	DVR	Daly River Mission Airport	Daly River Mission, Northern Territory	13°44′59″S 130°41′38″E	
YDMR		Delamere Station Airstrip	Delamere, Northern Territory	15°37′24″S 131°38′52″E	
YDNA		Maydena Airstrip	Maydena, Tasmania	42°45′48″S 146°33′41″E	
YDNB		Doongmabulla Airstrip	Laglan, Queensland	22°03′57″S 146°14′39″E	
YDNE		Mundine Airstrip	Boggabilla, New South Wales	28°36′59″S 150°09′03″E	
YDNG		Dingadee Airstrip	Mungindi, Queensland	28°51′55″S 148°46′44″E	
YDNI	NLF	Darnley Island Airport	Erub Island, Queensland	09°34′40″S 143°46′45″E	
YDNK		Darnick Airstrip	Menindee, New South Wales	32°53′00″S 143°34′59″E	
YDNR		Dunmore Manila Airstrip	Tamworth Region, New South Wales	30°39′29″S 150°52′30″E	
YDNV		Dynevor Downs Aerodrome	Thargomindah, Queensland	28°05′39″S 144°21′54″E	
YDOC		Dochra Airfield	Singleton, New South Wales	32°39′00″S 151°12′30″E	
YDOD		Donald Airport	Donald, Victoria	36°21′36″S 143°00′24″E	
YDOL		Dholtji Seaplane Base	East Arnhem, Northern Territory	11°56′47″S 136°27′42″E	
YDON		Dowerin Airstrip	Koomberkine, Western Australia	31°10′11″S 117°02′49″E	
YDOO		Donors Hill Airstrip	Stokes, Queensland	18°42′32″S 140°33′14″E	
YDOP		Donnington Airpark	Woodstock, Queensland	19°36′06″S 146°50′33″E	
YDOR	DRD	Dorunda Airport	Dorunda, Queensland	16°33′15″S 141°49′27″E	
YDOT		Dotswood Airstrip	Dotswood, Queensland	19°37′16″S 146°17′42″E	Military
YDPA		Deer Park Airstrip	Gurley, New South Wales	29°39′30″S 149°33′21″E	
YDPD	DVP	Davenport Downs Airport	Davenport Downs Station, Queensland	24°08′44″S 141°06′44″E	
YDPO	DPO	Devonport Airport	Devonport, Tasmania	41°10′11″S 146°25′49″E	
YDPR		Dneiper Airstrip	Hart, Northern Territory	22°37′21″S 135°11′46″E	
YDPS		Depot Springs Aerodrome	Sandstone, Western Australia	27°54′43″S 120°02′04″E	
YDPT		Depot Outcamp Aerodrome	Caiguna, Western Australia	31°34′30″S 125°11′07″E	
YDPW		Deep Well Airstrip	Hale, Northern Territory	24°17′53″S 134°08′36″E	
YDRA	DOX	Dongara Airport	Dongara, Western Australia	29°17′53″S 114°55′38″E	
YDRC		Dairy Creek Homestead Aerodrome	Gascoyne River, Western Australia	25°16′08″S 115°52′03″E	
YDRD	DRY	Drysdale River Airport	Drysdale River Station, Western Australia	15°42′47″S 126°22′53″E	
YDRE		Darr River Downs Airstrip	Longreach, Queensland	22°54′06″S 143°58′48″E	
YDRG		Duaringa Airstrip	Duaringa, Queensland	23°44′14″S 149°39′53″E	
YDRH	DHD	Durham Downs Airport	Durham Downs, Queensland	27°04′30″S 141°54′00″E	
YDRI	DRR	Durrie Airport	Durrie Station, Queensland	25°41′05″S 140°13′24″E	
YDRL		De Rose Hill Aerodrome	De Rose Hill, South Australia	26°26′09″S 133°15′36″E	
YDRN		Drouin Airstrip	Drouin South, Victoria	38°12′32″S 145°49′46″E	
YDRU		Drumburle Aerodrome	Thangool, Queensland	24°39′08″S 150°32′16″E	
YDRV		Dry River Airstrip	Conjuboy, Queensland	18°46′37″S 144°41′32″E	
YDRW		Derwent Bridge Heliport	Derwent Bridge, Tasmania	42°07′59″S 146°13′20″E	
YDRY		Drysdale Island Seaplane Base	Drysdale Island, Northern Territory	11°38′29″S 136°01′53″E	
YDSA		Darraweit Airstrip	Bylands, Victoria	37°22′09″S 144°56′24″E	
YDSV		Dorisvale Airstrip	Claravale, Northern Territory	14°30′02″S 131°20′49″E	
YDTY		Dalgety Airstrip	Kaban, Queensland	17°30′36″S 145°24′57″E	Closed
YDUG		Dungowan Airstrip	Clara Creek, Queensland	25°59′50″S 146°55′59″E	
YDUK		Duketon Airstrip	Bandya, Western Australia	27°58′41″S 122°17′44″E	
YDUM		Dumbleyung Airstrip	Dumbleyung, Western Australia	33°19′22″S 117°44′40″E	
YDUN		Dunwich Airstrip	North Stradbroke Island, Queensland	27°31′08″S 153°25′39″E	
YDUP		Dupuwarrmirri Airstrip	East Arnhem, Northern Territory	12°40′06″S 135°22′29″E	
YDVC		Devil Creek Heliport	Mardie, Western Australia	20°53′48″S 116°24′38″E	
YDVE		Dale River Airstrip	West Dale, Western Australia	32°16′43″S 116°32′08″E	
YDVR	DKV	Docker River Airport	Kaltukatjara, Northern Territory	24°51′30″S 129°07′24″E	
YDWF		Delamere Range Facility Air Base	Delamere, Northern Territory	15°44′49″S 131°55′10″E	
YDWG		Dwellingup Airstrip	Holyoake, Western Australia	32°41′34″S 116°04′30″E	
YDWN		Marion Downs Airstrip	Gibb, Western Australia	17°04′23″S 126°50′53″E	
YDWP		Deep Water Point Airstrip	Dampier Peninsula, Western Australia	16°41′47″S 123°04′26″E	Closed
YDWU		Dalwallinu Airstrip	Nugadong, Western Australia	30°11′59″S 116°39′19″E	
YDYD		Derry Downs Airstrip	Sandover, Northern Territory	22°04′31″S 135°20′27″E	Closed
YDYP		Dyke Point Heliport	Carrington, New South Wales	32°55′15″S 151°46′27″E	
YDYS	DYA	Dysart Airport	Dysart, Queensland	22°37′20″S 148°21′50″E	

== YE ==
ICAO	IATA	Airport name	Community	Coordinates	Notes
YEAB		Euabalong Airstrip	Euabalong, New South Wales	33°08′14″S 146°25′28″E	
YEAT		Yea Heliport	Yea, Victoria	37°12′52″S 145°25′52″E	
YEBE		Woleebee Creek Heliport	Woleebee, Queensland	26°16′57″S 149°42′09″E	
YEBV		Ellensbrook Vineyard Airstrip	Cowaramup, Western Australia	33°53′40″S 115°02′21″E	
YECB		Eco Beach Airstrip	Roebuck, Western Australia	18°19′24″S 122°07′36″E	
YECH	ECH	Echuca Airport	Echuca, Victoria	36°09′26″S 144°45′43″E	
YECK		Eastern Creek Heliport	Eastern Creek, New South Wales	33°48′15″S 150°52′03″E	
YECL	EUC	Eucla Airport	Eucla, Western Australia	31°42′00″S 128°52′59″E	
YECT		Eucla Roadway Airstrip	Eucla, Western Australia	31°42′11″S 128°49′52″E	Road airstrip
YECU		Echunga Heliport	Jupiter Creek, South Australia	35°06′10″S 138°44′36″E	
YEDA	ETD	Etadunna Airstrip	Etadunna, South Australia	28°43′59″S 138°33′04″E	
YEDB		Edithburgh Airstrip	Edithburgh, South Australia	35°05′48″S 137°44′06″E	Closed
YEDD		Eudunda Airstrip	Eudunda, South Australia	34°10′50″S 139°05′21″E	Closed
YEDE		Edenhope Airstrip	Edenhope, Victoria	37°01′13″S 141°16′01″E	
YEDM		Edmund Station Aerodrome	West Lyons River, Western Australia	23°46′08″S 116°05′56″E	
YEDW		Eleanor Downs Aerodrome	Seddon, South Australia	35°53′54″S 137°15′42″E	
YEEB	ENB	Eneabba Airport	Eneabba, Western Australia	29°49′57″S 115°14′46″E	
YEES		Elderslie Airstrip	Singleton Council Area, New South Wales	32°35′59″S 151°20′24″E	
YEGA		Enngonia Airstrip	Enngonia, New South Wales	29°18′40″S 145°51′27″E	
YEGF		Eaglefield Airstrip	Eaglefield, Queensland	21°28′46″S 147°41′44″E	
YEGS		Elgin Downs Airstrip	Belyando, Queensland	22°00′00″S 146°55′08″E	
YEHP		Erina Heliport	Green Point, New South Wales	33°26′26″S 151°22′07″E	
YEII		East Intercourse Heliport	Dampier Archipelago, Western Australia	20°39′22″S 116°40′55″E	
YEIN	EIH	Einasleigh Airport	Einasleigh, Queensland	18°30′12″S 144°05′38″E	
YEJI		East Jaurdi Airstrip	Wallaroo, Western Australia	30°46′10″S 120°18′43″E	
YELA		Ellendale Station Airstrip	Mount Hardman, Western Australia	17°55′23″S 124°49′42″E	
YELC		Eli Creek Seaplane Base	K'gari, Queensland	25°17′55″S 153°13′19″E	
YELD	ELC	Elcho Island Airport	Elcho Island, Northern Territory	12°01′12″S 135°34′12″E	
YELE		Belele Aerodrome	Meekatharra, Western Australia	26°22′03″S 118°02′21″E	
YELG		Elengerah Airstrip	Gin Gin, New South Wales	31°51′57″S 147°58′41″E	
YELI		Ellendale Mine Airstrip	Mount Hardman, Western Australia	17°33′46″S 124°50′08″E	
YELK		Elkedra Airstrip	Davenport, Northern Territory	21°10′21″S 135°26′38″E	
YELL		Elliott Airstrip	Pamayu, Northern Territory	17°31′39″S 133°31′48″E	
YELM		Elmore Airstrip	Burnewang, Victoria	36°29′25″S 144°38′50″E	
YELN		Elliston Airstrip	Elliston, South Australia	33°38′18″S 134°54′00″E	
YELS		Baddaginnie (Earlston) Airstrip	Violet Town, Victoria	36°33′04″S 145°48′18″E	
YELW		Eildon Weir Airstrip	Devils River, Victoria	37°12′30″S 145°49′59″E	Coordinates unverified
YELZ		Elizabeth Downs Station Airstrip	Tipperary, Northern Territory	13°44′38″S 130°30′18″E	
YEMC		Eight Mile Creek Airstrip	Marble Bar, Western Australia	20°56′02″S 120°05′00″E	Formerly YCPG
YEMG		Eromanga Airport	Eromanga, Queensland	26°42′17″S 143°15′43″E	
YEMJ		Emu Junction Airstrip	Maralinga Tjarutja, South Australia	28°37′34″S 132°12′19″E	
YEML	EMD	Emerald Airport	Emerald, Queensland	23°34′03″S 148°10′45″E	
YEMM		Emu Mine Airstrip	Leinster, Western Australia	27°59′18″S 120°30′19″E	
YEMP		Emu Park Airstrip	Emu Park, Queensland	23°15′18″S 150°48′52″E	
YEMU		Barrapunta (Emu) Airstrip	Flying Fox, Northern Territory	13°09′02″S 134°51′02″E	
YENO		Enoggera Barracks Heliport	Enoggera, Queensland	27°25′39″S 152°58′18″E	
YEPA		Epic Energy One Airstrip	Strzelecki Desert, South Australia	28°44′09″S 140°02′24″E	Formerly YTNE
YEPB		Epic Energy Two Airstrip	Murnpeowie, South Australia	29°33′55″S 139°56′28″E	Formerly YTOS
YEPC		Epic Energy Three Airstrip	Wooltana Station, South Australia	30°21′06″S 139°39′43″E	Formerly YTEC
YEPD		Epic Energy Four Airstrip	Wirrealpa, South Australia	31°10′51″S 139°22′52″E	Formerly YTNN
YEPE		Epic Energy Five Airstrip	Baratta, South Australia	31°58′15″S 139°12′32″E	Formerly YTEN
YEPL		Epsilon Airstrip	Cameron Corner, Queensland	28°17′41″S 141°11′52″E	
YEPR		Epenarra Airstrip	Davenport, Northern Territory	20°26′53″S 135°15′00″E	
YEPT		Emu Point Airstrip	Nemarluk, Northern Territory	14°10′22″S 130°19′11″E	
YEQO		El Questro Airstrip	Durack, Western Australia	15°59′59″S 127°58′27″E	
YEQY		Elizabeth Quay Seaplane Base	Perth, Western Australia	31°58′00″S 115°51′42″E	
YERA		Errabiddy Homestead Aerodrome	Gascoyne River, Western Australia	25°29′48″S 117°10′33″E	
YERH		Earaheedy Aerodrome	Lake Carnegie, Western Australia	25°37′03″S 121°34′42″E	
YERI		Eringoarrah Airstrip	Oura, New South Wales	35°03′54″S 147°41′16″E	
YERL		Erldunda Airstrip	Ghan, Northern Territory	25°12′22″S 133°15′15″E	
YERN	ERB	Ernabella Airport	Pukatja, South Australia	26°15′45″S 132°10′54″E	
YERO		Erong Station Airstrip	Gascoyne River, Western Australia	25°33′37″S 116°39′37″E	
YERS		Ernestina Plains Airstrip	Julia Creek, Queensland	20°34′57″S 141°05′03″E	
YERU		Erudina Aerodrome	Erudina, South Australia	31°26′00″S 139°25′53″E	
YERY		Beemery Airstrip	Bourke, New South Wales	29°58′03″S 146°26′16″E	
YESC		Escott Airstrip	Nicholson, Queensland	17°43′30″S 139°25′01″E	
YESD		Eidsvold Airstrip	Eidsvold, Queensland	25°21′39″S 151°06′32″E	
YESE	ERQ	Elrose Airport	Eloise Copper Mine, Queensland	20°58′34″S 141°00′23″E	
YESH		El Sharana Airstrip	Gulung Mardrulk, Northern Territory	13°33′25″S 132°37′37″E	
YESN		Ellerston Airstrip	Ellerston, New South Wales	31°49′38″S 151°18′25″E	
YESP	EPR	Esperance Airport	Esperance, Western Australia	33°41′04″S 121°49′22″E	
YEST		Esperance Town Seaplane Base	Esperance, Western Australia	33°51′59″S 121°54′01″E	
YETT		North Gregory/Elliott Field Aerodrome	Elliott, Queensland	25°03′01″S 152°13′16″E	
YEUA		Euroa Airstrip	Euroa, Victoria	36°44′41″S 145°30′48″E	
YEUC		Euchareena Airstrip	Euchareena, New South Wales	32°55′45″S 149°06′19″E	
YEUD		Eudamulla Station Aerodrome	West Lyons River, Western Australia	24°26′36″S 115°36′35″E	
YEUG		Eurong Seaplane Base	Eurong, Queensland	25°30′44″S 153°07′36″E	
YEUK		Euroka Springs Airstrip	Taldora, Queensland	19°52′27″S 141°29′02″E	
YEUL		Eurella Station Airstrip	Eurella, Queensland	26°37′08″S 148°14′09″E	
YEUO		Eulo Airstrip	Eulo, Queensland	28°10′09″S 145°02′30″E	
YEVA		Eva Downs Airstrip	Creswell, Northern Territory	18°00′04″S 134°51′47″E	
YEVD	EVH	Evans Head Memorial Aerodrome	Evans Head, New South Wales	29°05′36″S 153°25′12″E	
YEVM		Evesham Airstrip	Longreach, Queensland	23°02′00″S 143°42′44″E	
YEVP		Everard Park Airstrip	Mimili, South Australia	27°02′20″S 132°41′19″E	
YEVV		Eva Valley (Manyallaluk) Airstrip	Nitmiluk, Northern Territory	14°15′58″S 132°49′51″E	
YEVW		East View Airstrip	Cressy, Tasmania	41°40′40″S 146°58′16″E	
YEWA		Eliwana Airport	Eliwana Mine, Western Australia	22°25′41″S 116°53′12″E	
YEWI		East Wallabi Island Airstrip	East Wallabi Island, Western Australia	28°26′12″S 113°44′08″E	
YEWO		Brewon Airstrip	Brewon, New South Wales	30°14′07″S 147°31′01″E	
YEXM	EXM	Exmouth Airport	Exmouth Gulf Station, Western Australia	22°02′29″S 114°06′08″E	
YEYD		Evelyn Downs Aerodrome	Evelyn Downs, South Australia	28°12′14″S 134°29′27″E	

== YF ==
ICAO	IATA	Airport name	Community	Coordinates	Notes
YFAP		Fawkner Park Heliport	Fawkner, Victoria	37°42′50″S 144°58′18″E	
YFAR		Farnsfield Airstrip	Farnsfield, Queensland	25°07′00″S 152°17′39″E	
YFBR		Fairey Bower Aerodrome	Coonamble, New South Wales	30°53′00″S 148°14′47″E	
YFBS	FRB	Forbes Airport	Forbes, New South Wales	33°21′48″S 147°56′06″E	
YFCK		Fish Creek Airstrip	Fish Creek, Victoria	38°42′31″S 146°03′16″E	
YFCN		Fort Constantine Airstrip	Cloncurry, Queensland	20°28′55″S 140°34′46″E	
YFCU		Fortescue River Airstrip	Mardie, Western Australia	21°17′21″S 116°07′54″E	
YFDF	KFE	Fortescue Dave Forrest Airport	Fortescue's Cloud Break mine, Western Australia	22°17′31″S 119°26′14″E	
YFDN		Federation Airstrip	Downside, New South Wales	35°00′46″S 147°22′25″E	
YFFD		Stirling North/Flinders Field Aerodrome	Stirling North, South Australia	32°31′48″S 137°51′10″E	
YFFT		Farrell Flat Airstrip	Farrell Flat, South Australia	33°50′48″S 138°46′39″E	Closed
YFGS		Frogs Hollow Aerodrome	Frogs Hollow, New South Wales	36°45′38″S 149°48′15″E	
YFHA		Finch Hatton Airstrip	Finch Hatton, Queensland	21°08′27″S 148°38′55″E	
YFHO		Fairfield Hospital Heliport	Prairiewood, New South Wales	33°51′32″S 150°54′20″E	
YFIG		Fig Tree Airstrip	Irongate, Queensland	27°38′10″S 151°30′43″E	
YFIL	FLY	Finley Airport	Finley, New South Wales	35°39′31″S 145°33′42″E	
YFLD		Facing Island Heliport	Gladstone Harbour, Queensland	23°52′41″S 151°22′23″E	
YFLF		Flora Reef Seaplane Base	Coral Sea Islands	17°11′18″S 146°18′10″E	
YFLI	FLS	Flinders Island Airport	Flinders Island (Whitemark), Tasmania	40°05′29″S 147°59′34″E	
YFLK		Falls Creek Heliport	Falls Creek, Victoria	36°51′40″S 147°16′38″E	
YFLO	FVL	Flora Valley Airport	Shire of Halls Creek, Western Australia	18°17′52″S 128°27′21″E	
YFLR		Florina Airstrip	Florina, Northern Territory	14°27′10″S 131°41′18″E	
YFLS		Flinders Island Airstrip	Flinders Island, South Australia	33°43′52″S 134°30′04″E	
YFLT		Fairlight Airstrip	Palmer, Queensland	15°46′19″S 144°03′12″E	
YFLV		Fletcherview Airstrip	Basalt, Queensland	19°53′07″S 146°12′26″E	
YFLY		Flynn Reef Seaplane Base	Coral Sea Islands	16°43′48″S 146°16′01″E	
YFMA		Malahide Airstrip	Fingal, Tasmania	41°35′14″S 147°58′35″E	Closed
YFND		Flinders Naval Depot Heliport	HMAS Cerberus, Victoria	38°22′06″S 145°11′20″E	
YFNE	FIK	Finke Airport	Aputula, Northern Territory	25°35′41″S 134°34′59″E	
YFNI		Flinders Island Heliport	Flinders Group National Park, Queensland	14°10′36″S 144°13′59″E	
YFON		Fonthill Airstrip	Lemont, Tasmania	42°21′04″S 147°35′40″E	
YFOR		Fortnum Airstrip	Peak Hill, Western Australia	25°20′17″S 118°22′41″E	
YFOS		Fossil Downs Station Aerodrome	Wunaamin Miliwundi Ranges, Western Australia	18°07′53″S 125°47′23″E	
YFPK		Football Park Heliport	West Lakes, South Australia	34°52′48″S 138°29′44″E	
YFPU		Scarborough FPU Heliport	Offshore Western Australia	19°55′34″S 113°14′29″E	
YFRA		Frankland Islands Seaplane Base	Frankland Group National Park, Queensland	17°13′00″S 146°05′00″E	
YFRD		Frome Downs Aerodrome	Frome Downs, South Australia	31°13′13″S 139°46′53″E	
YFRG		Fregon Airstrip	Kaltjiti, South Australia	26°46′33″S 132°01′03″E	
YFRH		Forest Hill Airstrip	Forest Hill, Queensland	27°36′18″S 152°22′21″E	
YFRI		Friendly Beaches Airfield	Friendly Beaches, Tasmania	42°00′00″S 148°15′32″E	
YFRK		Frankland Valley Airstrip	Frankland River, Western Australia	34°20′52″S 116°57′10″E	
YFRS		Forest Vale Airstrip	Forestvale, Queensland	25°55′57″S 147°52′06″E	
YFRT	FOS	Forrest Airport	Forrest, Western Australia	30°50′18″S 128°06′54″E	
YFRV	FVR	Forest River Mission Airport	Oombulgurri Community, Western Australia	15°09′53″S 127°50′24″E	
YFSA		Forsayth Airstrip	Forsayth, Queensland	18°35′12″S 143°33′57″E	
YFSK		Fiskville CFA Training Ground Airstrip	Fiskville, Victoria near Ballan	37°40′41″S 144°13′15″E	
YFSR		Fisher Airstrip	Gulung Mardrulk, Northern Territory	13°33′25″S 132°37′36″E	
YFST	FOT	Forster (Wallis Island) Airport	Forster, New South Wales	32°12′15″S 152°28′44″E	Closed
YFTA		Forrestania Airport	Forrestania, Western Australia	32°34′42″S 119°42′24″E	
YFTC		Fort Cooper Airstrip	Hail Creek, Queensland	21°33′49″S 148°27′00″E	
YFTL		Fremantle Heliport	North Fremantle, Western Australia	32°02′43″S 115°43′59″E	
YFTN		Mount Fitton Talc Aerodrome	Moolawatana Station, South Australia	29°54′25″S 139°28′31″E	
YFTR		Foster Heliport	Foster, Victoria	38°39′23″S 146°12′19″E	
YFTZ	FIZ	Fitzroy Crossing Airport	Fitzroy Crossing, Western Australia	18°10′55″S 125°33′31″E	
YFVW		Fairview Aerodrome	Dubbo Region, New South Wales	32°47′26″S 148°43′26″E	
YFWD		Fleetwood Airstrip	Aramac, Queensland	22°17′18″S 145°48′07″E	
YFWV		Freshwater Valley Heliport	Redlynch, Queensland	16°54′51″S 145°42′13″E	
YFWY		Faraway Bay Airstrip	Drysdale River, Western Australia	13°58′51″S 127°10′52″E	

== YG ==
ICAO	IATA	Airport name	Community	Coordinates	Notes
YGAA		Gawa Airstrip	Elcho Island, Northern Territory	11°46′19″S 135°54′08″E	
YGAD		HMAS Stirling	Garden Island, Western Australia	32°14′30″S 115°41′00″E	
YGAH		Greenbah Airstrip	Wee Waa, New South Wales	30°07′33″S 149°26′04″E	
YGAI		Garmedi Airfield	West Arnhem, Northern Territory	12°19′07″S 134°42′16″E	
YGAM	GBP	Gamboola Airport	Gamboola, Queensland	16°32′39″S 143°40′05″E	
YGAN		Gan Gan Aerodrome	East Arnhem, Northern Territory	13°02′52″S 135°57′10″E	
YGAR		Gnaraloo Station Aerodrome	Macleod, Western Australia	23°47′30″S 113°31′44″E	
YGAS		Gatton Airpark	Gatton, Queensland	27°35′24″S 152°15′24″E	
YGAW		Gawler Aerodrome	South Australia	34°36′00″S 138°43′08″E	
YGAY	GAH	Gayndah Airport	Gayndah, Queensland	25°36′56″S 151°37′16″E	
YGBE		The Glebe Heliport	Launceston, Tasmania	41°25′37″S 147°08′40″E	
YGBF		Barwon Field Aerodrome	Gnarwarre, Victoria	38°08′49″S 144°10′21″E	
YGBI	GBL	South Goulburn Island Airport	Goulburn Islands, Northern Territory	11°39′00″S 133°22′54″E	
YGBK		Glenbrook Heliport	RAAF Base Glenbrook, New South Wales	33°45′41″S 150°38′10″E	
YGBO		Gabo Island Airstrip	Gabo Island, Victoria	37°33′57″S 149°54′40″E	
YGBS		Gilberton Station Airstrip	Gilberton, Etheridge Shire, Queensland	19°12′34″S 143°39′48″E	
YGBW		Gunbower Airstrip	Gunbower, Victoria	35°57′59″S 144°22′52″E	
YGCA		Gumeracha Heliport	Gumeracha, South Australia	34°49′14″S 138°53′11″E	
YGCR		Gloucester Airstrip	Gloucester, New South Wales	32°03′12″S 151°58′34″E	
YGDA		Goodooga Airport	Goodooga, New South Wales	29°04′24″S 147°22′24″E	
YGDD		Glendon Homestead Airstrip	Glenden, Queensland	21°19′51″S 148°05′35″E	
YGDH	GUH	Gunnedah Airport	Gunnedah, New South Wales	30°57′42″S 150°15′00″E	
YGDI	GOO	Goondiwindi Airport	Goondiwindi, Queensland	28°31′17″S 150°19′13″E	
YGDL		Gindalbie Homestead Aerodrome	Kurnalpi, Western Australia	30°17′24″S 121°46′39″E	
YGDN	GDD	Gordon Downs Airport	Gordon Downs, Western Australia	18°40′41″S 128°35′31″E	
YGDO		Gundaroo Airport	Gundaroo, New South Wales	35°02′43″S 149°15′26″E	
YGDR		The Garden Airstrip	Hart, Northern Territory	23°17′43″S 134°26′30″E	
YGDS	GGD	Gregory Downs Airport	Gregory, Queensland	18°37′32″S 139°14′01″E	
YGDT		Gladstone Airstrip	Gladstone, South Australia	33°17′18″S 138°19′30″E	
YGDV		Gladevale Airstrip	Cambridge, Queensland	20°14′58″S 142°26′21″E	
YGDW		Granite Downs Airstrip	Aṉangu Pitjantjatjara Yankunytjatjara, South Australia	26°56′54″S 133°36′25″E	
YGEE		Geebung Airstrip	Drysdale River, Western Australia	14°12′11″S 127°20′57″E	
YGEH		Geelong Hospital Heliport	Geelong, Victoria	38°09′05″S 144°21′57″E	
YGEI		Geehi Landing Ground	Geehi, New South Wales	36°22′55″S 148°10′50″E	
YGEL	GET	Geraldton Airport	Geraldton, Western Australia	28°47′46″S 114°42′27″E	
YGEN		The Glen Airfield	Shoalwater, Queensland	22°49′19″S 150°19′58″E	Military
YGFN	GFN	Clarence Valley Regional Airport	Grafton, New South Wales	29°45′36″S 153°01′48″E	
YGGE		Golden Grove Airport	Golden Grove Mine, Western Australia	28°45′54″S 116°58′18″E	
YGGG		Gulgong Airstrip	Stubbo, New South Wales	32°17′54″S 149°33′42″E	
YGGI		Goolgowi Airstrip	Goolgowi, New South Wales	33°59′31″S 145°43′09″E	
YGGL		Glen Garland Airstrip	Yarraden, Queensland	14°51′05″S 143°16′26″E	
YGGO		Goonoo Goonoo Airstrip	Goonoo Goonoo, Tamworth Region, New South Wales	31°17′55″S 150°55′14″E	
YGGR		Goongarrie Mine Airstrip	Menzies, Western Australia	30°02′35″S 121°08′36″E	
YGGS		Gregory Springs Airstrip	Porcupine, Queensland	19°42′36″S 144°22′23″E	
YGHG		Glen Harding Heliport	Minnamoolka, Queensland	18°14′55″S 145°07′33″E	
YGHP		Glenample Heliport	Princetown, Victoria	38°39′37″S 143°06′22″E	
YGHS		Gnaraloo Homestead Aerodrome	Macleod, Western Australia	23°49′33″S 113°31′50″E	
YGHT		Gold Coast Helitours Heliport	Main Beach, Queensland	27°58′10″S 153°25′25″E	
YGIA	GBW	Ginbata Airport	Ginbata, Western Australia	23°33′28″S 120°02′53″E	
YGIB	GBV	Gibb River Airport	Shire of Wyndham–East Kimberley, Western Australia	16°25′08″S 126°26′46″E	
YGID		Gidgee Airstrip	Sandstone, Western Australia	27°16′12″S 119°24′18″E	
YGIF		Gifford Creek Station Airstrip	West Lyons River, Western Australia	24°02′49″S 116°13′03″E	
YGIG		RAAF Base Gingin	Gingin, Western Australia	31°27′54″S 115°51′48″E	
YGIL		Gilgandra Aerodrome	Gilgandra, New South Wales	31°41′49″S 148°38′10″E	
YGIR		Giralia Airstrip	Exmouth Gulf Station, Western Australia	22°40′48″S 114°22′16″E	
YGIS		Gisborne Heliport	Gisborne, Victoria	37°29′03″S 144°35′08″E	
YGKL	GKL	Great Keppel Island Airport	Great Keppel Island, Queensland	23°11′04″S 150°56′30″E	
YGLA	GLT	Gladstone Airport	Gladstone, Queensland	23°52′11″S 151°13′22″E	
YGLB	GUL	Goulburn Airport	Goulburn, New South Wales	34°48′22″S 149°43′51″E	
YGLC		Glencoe Airstrip	Collie, New South Wales	31°37′14″S 148°11′59″E	
YGLD		Glendambo Airstrip	Coondambo, South Australia	30°58′54″S 135°46′40″E	
YGLE	GLG	Glengyle Airport	Glengyle Station, Queensland	24°47′56″S 139°35′48″E	
YGLG	GEX	Geelong Airport	Grovedale, Victoria	38°13′31″S 144°19′59″E	Closed
YGLI	GLI	Glen Innes Airport	Glen Innes, New South Wales	29°40′30″S 151°41′24″E	
YGLK		Glenbrook NPWS Heliport	Blue Labyrinth, New South Wales	33°47′15″S 150°36′31″E	
YGLN		Glenroy Estate Airstrip	Belton, South Australia	32°15′40″S 138°38′39″E	
YGLO	GLM	Glenormiston Airport	Glenormiston Station, Queensland	22°53′21″S 138°49′18″E	
YGLP		Gallipolli Airstrip	Nicholson, Northern Territory	19°08′31″S 137°52′27″E	
YGLR		Glenroy Station Aerodrome	Wunaamin Miliwundi Ranges, Western Australia	17°18′30″S 126°04′28″E	
YGLS		Giles Airport	Warakurna Community, Western Australia	25°02′37″S 128°17′46″E	
YGLY		Glenayle Homestead Airstrip	Little Sandy Desert, Western Australia	25°14′18″S 122°04′02″E	
YGMD		Goomadeer Airstrip	West Arnhem, Northern Territory	12°05′43″S 133°40′49″E	Closed
YGMG		Gamurruguyurru Airstrip	West Arnhem, Northern Territory	12°03′22″S 134°45′47″E	
YGMP		Grampians Airstrip	Brimpaen, Victoria	37°02′54″S 142°16′13″E	
YGMS		Greymare/Mountain Station Airstrip	Greymare, Queensland	28°12′12″S 151°46′18″E	Closed
YGMT		Greenmount Airstrip	Greenmount, Toowoomba Region, Queensland	27°45′49″S 151°55′32″E	
YGMW		Garmarrgawon Airstrip	West Arnhem, Northern Territory	12°38′50″S 134°04′23″E	
YGNA		Granada Airstrip	Three Rivers, Queensland	20°05′53″S 140°22′14″E	
YGNB		RAAF Base Glenbrook	Glenbrook, New South Wales	33°45′48″S 150°38′12″E	Helipads only
YGNE		Gnarwarre (North Park) Airfield	Gnarwarre, Victoria	38°09′54″S 144°06′27″E	
YGNI		Green Island Heliport	Green Island, Queensland	16°45′37″S 145°58′19″E	
YGNO		Goonoo Feedlot Airstrip	Comet, Queensland	23°45′29″S 148°32′09″E	
YGNR		Glenore Airstrip	Stokes, Queensland	18°28′36″S 141°06′49″E	
YGNV	GVP	Greenvale Airport	Greenvale, Queensland	18°59′42″S 145°00′43″E	
YGNW		Gnowangerup Airstrip	Pallinup, Western Australia	33°58′37″S 118°00′40″E	
YGOD		Loloma Heliport	Goldfields, Queensland	28°28′14″S 151°46′17″E	
YGOM		Goomalling Airstrip	Hulongine, Western Australia	31°21′36″S 116°53′29″E	
YGON	GPD	Mount Gordon Airport	Gunpowder Mine, Queensland	19°46′21″S 139°24′16″E	
YGOR		Gorrie Airstrip	Elsey, Northern Territory	15°29′10″S 133°10′46″E	
YGPA		Old Goodparla Airstrip	Kakadu, Northern Territory	13°28′20″S 132°16′06″E	
YGPE		Glen Prairie Airstrip	Marlborough, Queensland	22°36′39″S 149°56′53″E	
YGPI		Giles Point Airstrip	Newman, Western Australia	23°17′26″S 119°08′54″E	
YGPR		Gunpowder Airstrip	Gunpowder, Queensland	19°42′02″S 139°23′25″E	
YGPT	GPN	Garden Point Airport	Melville Island, Northern Territory	11°23′57″S 130°25′31″E	
YGRA		Garangula Station Heliport	Cooneys Creek, New South Wales	34°42′28″S 148°17′33″E	
YGRD		Grovedale Airstrip	Mount Duneed, Victoria	38°13′00″S 144°19′59″E	Closed
YGRK		Garryak Airstrip	East Arnhem, Northern Territory	12°08′51″S 135°33′45″E	
YGRL		Great Lakes Airport	Lakes Entrance, Victoria	37°50′32″S 148°00′00″E	
YGRM		Gruyere Airport	Gruyere Gold Mine, Western Australia	28°02′04″S 123°48′52″E	
YGRN		Gordon Airstrip	Mackenzie, Central Highlands Region, Queensland	22°56′18″S 149°20′40″E	
YGRO		Gore/Rooaroo Airstrip	Gore, Queensland	28°18′48″S 151°26′54″E	
YGRP		Granite Peak Airstrip	Wiluna, Western Australia	25°40′21″S 121°21′39″E	
YGRS	GYZ	Granny Smith Airport	Granny Smith Gold Mine, Western Australia	28°45′48″S 122°26′18″E	Also YMNW
YGRT		Graytown Airstrip	Puckapunyal, Victoria	36°50′43″S 144°56′13″E	Military
YGRU		Glen Ruth Airstrip	Glen Ruth, Queensland	18°04′42″S 145°24′25″E	
YGSC	GSC	Gascoyne Junction Airport	Gascoyne Junction, Western Australia	25°03′16″S 115°12′09″E	
YGSD		Greenside Airstrip	Muchea, Western Australia	31°31′26″S 115°56′26″E	
YGSN		Mount Gibson Airstrip	Paynes Find, Western Australia	29°36′25″S 117°24′07″E	
YGST		Grundy Street Heliport	Woree, Queensland	16°57′39″S 145°44′59″E	
YGTA		Garrathala Airstrip	East Arnhem, Northern Territory	12°45′43″S 136°34′08″E	
YGTC		Gemtree Caravan Park Airstrip	Anmatjere, Northern Territory	22°58′15″S 134°14′51″E	
YGTE	GTE	Groote Eylandt Airport	Groote Eylandt (Alyangula), Northern Territory	13°58′30″S 136°27′36″E	
YGTH	GFF	Griffith Airport	Griffith, New South Wales	34°15′06″S 146°04′00″E	
YGTJ		Gudjekbinj Airstrip	West Arnhem, Northern Territory	12°15′06″S 133°48′17″E	
YGTM		Grasstree Mine Heliport	Bundoora, Queensland	22°59′21″S 148°34′39″E	
YGTN	GTT	Georgetown Airport	Georgetown, Queensland	18°18′09″S 143°31′53″E	
YGTO	GEE	George Town Airport	George Town, Tasmania	41°04′48″S 146°50′24″E	
YGTP		Greenthorpe Airstrip	Greenethorpe, New South Wales	33°59′00″S 148°25′01″E	Closed
YGUB		Gumarrirnbang Airstrip	West Arnhem, Northern Territory	12°19′36″S 133°59′36″E	
YGUL		Gullewa Airstrip	Yalgoo, Western Australia	28°38′46″S 116°18′37″E	
YGUM		Gurrumurru Airstrip	East Arnhem, Northern Territory	12°35′34″S 136°13′45″E	
YGUU		Gulurrunga Seaplane Base	East Arnhem, Northern Territory	12°29′40″S 136°46′57″E	
YGUW		Gunnawarra Airfield	Gunnawarra, Queensland	17°57′00″S 145°10′01″E	
YGVE		Glendevie Airstrip	Glendevie, Tasmania	43°13′54″S 147°00′01″E	
YGWA		Goolwa Airport	Goolwa, South Australia	35°28′54″S 138°45′06″E	
YGWD		Galway Downs Airstrip	Jundah, Queensland	25°11′17″S 142°41′20″E	
YGWG		Gwinganna Heliport	Tallebudgera Valley, Queensland	28°10′43″S 153°23′35″E	
YGWN		Goodwyn Platform Heliport	Offshore Western Australia	19°39′07″S 115°55′47″E	
YGYM	GYP	Gympie Airport	Gympie, Queensland	26°17′21″S 152°42′09″E	
