= ERQ =

ERQ may refer to:

- Ed's Redeeming Qualities, a musical group
- Église réformée du Québec, a Christian denomination
- Elrose Mine Airport, serving the Eloise Copper Mine in Queensland, Australia (ATA code ERQ)
