= List of airports by ICAO code: Y =

The prefix Y is reserved for Australia. For many (but not all) Australian ICAO codes, the second letter indicates which flight information region (FIR) the airport belongs to – B Brisbane, S Sydney, M Melbourne and P Perth. However, the Sydney and Perth FIRs no longer exist and have been merged into the Brisbane and Melbourne FIRs, although the airport codes remain unchanged (e.g. Sydney YSSY, Darwin YPDN).

Due to the size of this list, it has been split into three lists:

- List of airports by ICAO code: YA-YG
- List of airports by ICAO code: YH-YQ
- List of airports by ICAO code: YR-YZ
