= Great Lakes Airport =

Great Lakes Airport Kepper Field
- IATA: none; ICAO: YGRL

Summary
- Airport type: Private
- Owner: KFT Investments Pty Ltd
- Serves: Lakes Entrance
- Location: Lakes Entrance, Victoria
- Elevation AMSL: 260 ft / 79 m
- Coordinates: 37°50′32″S 148°00′00″E

Map
- Location of airport in Victoria

Runways
Direction	Length		Surface
Direction	ft	m	Surface
08/26	3,894	1,180	Bitumen
13/31	2,211	670	Gravel
- Sources: Australian AIP and aerodrome chart

Great Lakes Airport also known as Kepper Field (ICAO: YGRL) is a private airport located approximately 6 km (3.7 mi) north of the town of Lakes Entrance in eastern Victoria, Australia. The airport was officially opened on 2 November 2003 and is capable of operating 24 hours. The airport facilities are designed to handle transport category aircraft, although there is no regular passenger service.

== History ==
Great Lakes Airport came about through a partnership between local aviator Col Campbell and Melbourne based entrepreneur George Kepper. A consideration during the construction was the ability to operate corporate jet types such as the Cessna Citations operated by another of Kepper's business interests at Essendon Airport, charter and fixed-base operator Executive Airlines. The airport was constructed by Bairnsdale based civil engineering firm Gamcorp and opened in 2003.

Current operations at the airport are limited, however in times of emergency it sees use by air ambulance and Country Fire Authority aircraft. Whilst privately operated, visiting aircraft are welcome to land at Great Lakes by prior arrangement and the airport boasts facilities including a passenger terminal, hardstands and hangars to accommodate various categories of aircraft ranging from ultralights to transport category turboprop airliners and light jets. The primary runway, 08/26 is equipped with Pilot Activated Lighting to facilitate 24-hour operations. Limited charter service is permitted to operate, however as a private venture, Great Lakes does not currently meet Civil Aviation Safety Authority standards as a licensed aerodrome and does not receive regular airline traffic.
