= Badagarang =

Rural suburb near the South Coast of Australia

Badagarang is a new suburb in Shoalhaven City Council. It is planned to house thousands of people and to have 3,500 houses. The name is meant to represent the Eastern Grey Kangaroo, the traditional totem of the Dharawal People. Badagarang was formally gazetted on 24 February 2023.
