= Exmouth Gulf Station =

Pastoral lease in Western Australia

Coordinates: 22°22′35.53″S 114°06′36.90″E

Location in Western Australia

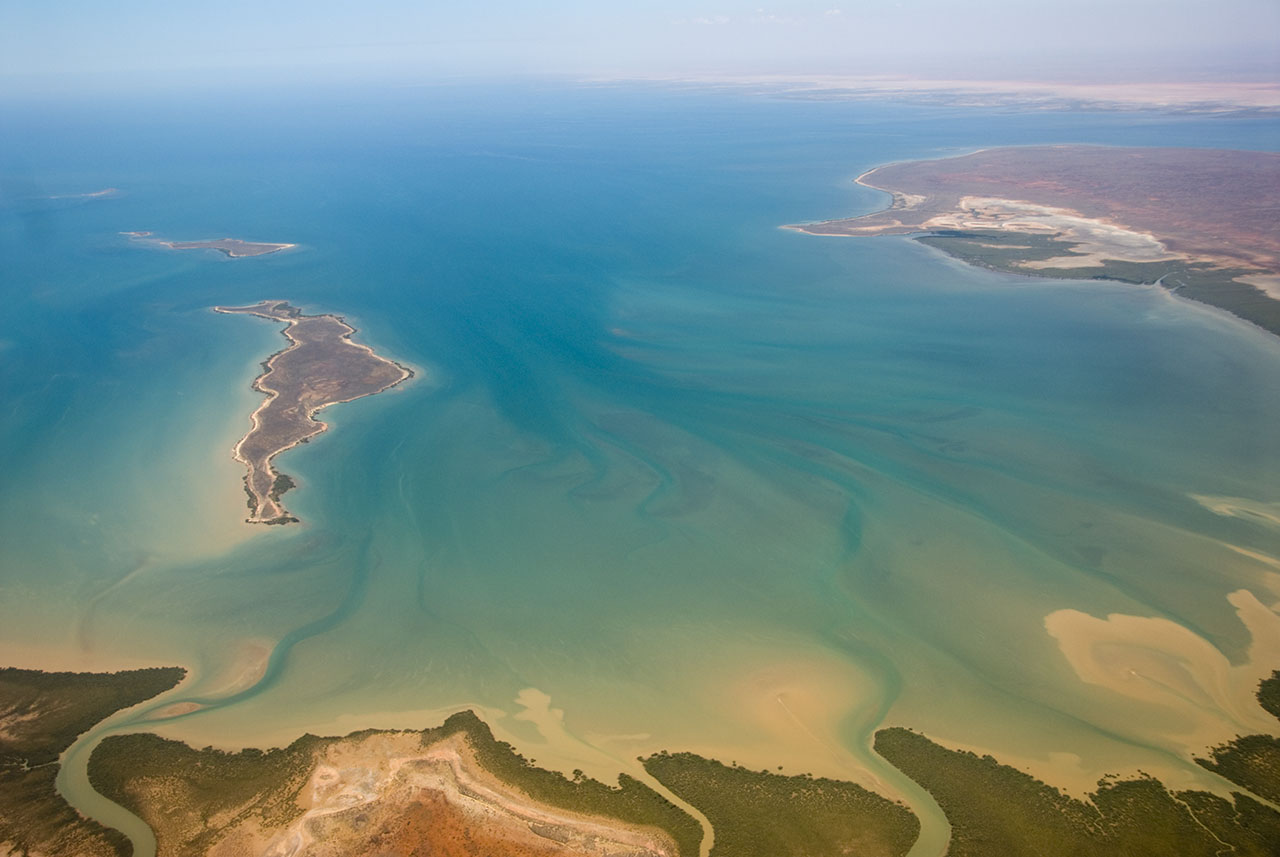
Gales Bay at the south end of Exmouth Gulf

Exmouth Gulf Station or Exmouth Station is a pastoral lease and sheep station located in the Gascoyne region of Western Australia, approximately 50 kilometres (31 mi) south of Exmouth. Occupying an area of 92,364 hectares (228,236 acres), the station occupies much of the eastern side of North West Cape; the eastern boundary of the station is the gulf, from which the station takes its name.

The area was under pastoral lease beginning in 1876 when J Brockman acquired leases in the area covering North West Cape to run cattle. Brockman sold parts of the lease in 1888 to ornithologist Thomas Carter including Exmouth, Yardie Creek and Ningaloo Station. Carter was the first settler in the area and established a pastoral station in 1889 grazing sheep. He then established most of the coastal wells and carefully recorded the Aboriginal names of the places in which they were located.

Initially Yardie Creek and Exmouth were part of the same lease, but were split in 1912 at the same time the Point Cloates whaling station was established on the coast nearby.

In 1931 the station was sold from the estate of Messrs King and Watson to the manager of Minilya Station, Mr S.T Lefroy, for the sum of £13,000.

The first significant oil strike in Australia occurred at Rough Range within the boundaries of the station, and oil is still being produced in the area and pumped out to Cape Range.

A Boomerang A-46 aircraft hit a wireless mast while making a low pass over the station in 1943, tearing a section off the wing of the plane. The pilot made it safely back to Potshot airfield for repairs.

Exmouth Gulf is operating under the Crown Lease number CL100-1976 and has the Land Act number LA3114/996.

== See also ==
- List of pastoral leases in Western Australia
