= Commonwealth Hill Station =

Pastoral lease in South Australia

Coordinates: 29°56′35″S 134°9′8″E

Location in South Australia

Commonwealth Hill Station, more commonly known as Commonwealth Hill, is a pastoral lease currently operating as a sheep station.

Commonwealth Hill is located about 96 kilometres (60 mi) north north west of Tarcoola and 120 kilometres (75 mi) south west of Coober Pedy in the state of South Australia.

The property occupies an area of approximately 1.3 million hectares making it the largest contiguous sheep station in the world, currently owned by Professor Khalil (Charlie) Shahin AO Atayf Aggregation.

== History ==
In 1947 the station was enjoying an excellent season after good rains produced an abundance of fresh green feed for stock during the summer. The area was also rife with rumours that the Woomera Test Range was to be expanded and that stations including Commonwealth Hill, Bulgunnia, Roxby Downs and Andamooka would lose some of their land, which in turn would reduce their wool clip. The rumours were confirmed; the station lies within the Woomera Test Range Area. Byron MacLachlan, the leaseholder of Commonwealth Hill in 1947, along with a consortium of pastoralists and lawyers, established a working agreement to ensure the continuation of pastoral activity that would not interfere with the long-range weapons project.

In 1956 before the trials of the Black Knight Rocket commenced at Woomera safety risks to pastoralists were identified as a key concern. In 1957 the minister of Supply, Howard Beale, spoke with the graziers who could be affected by the trials and announced that the Commonwealth government would pay for the installation of blast-proof shelters.

An iron ore exploration company, Apollo Minerals, was given permission in 2011 by the Defence Department to start work on its prospect in the area following a Federal Government review on mining in the former missile testing area.

In 2013, the land occupied by the pastoral lease was declared by the Government of South Australia under the Geographical Names Act 1991 as a locality with the name "Commonwealth Hill".

== Environment ==
The land on which the station is situated is described as a flat sandy plain on the north-western margin of the Gawler craton, covered with sand sheets and dunefields. Low mulga woodlands and tall myall shrublands over perennial grasses dominate with occasional salt lakes and lunette systems.

== See also ==
- List of ranches and stations § Australia
- List of the largest stations in Australia
