= Scotia, New South Wales =

Scotia
- Town
- Coordinates: 33°7′1″S 141°6′6″E
- Country: Australia
- State: New South Wales
- LGA: Unincorporated Far West Region
- Location: 130 km (81 mi) S of Broken Hill, New South Wales

Government
  - State electorate: Barwon
  - Federal division: Parkes

Population
  - Total: 12 (2021 census)

Scotia is a small settlement in south-west New South Wales, Australia, about 130 kilometres (81 mi) south of Broken Hill on the Silver City Highway. At the time of the 2021 census, Scotia had a population of 12 people.

Summer temperatures can reach 40 °C (104 °F).

== Demographics ==
As of the 2021 Australian census, 12 people resided in Scotia, down from 26 in the 2016 census. The median age of persons in Scotia was 61 years. There were fewer males than females, with 33.3% of the population male and 66.7% female. The average household size was 1.4 people per household.
