= Eloise Copper Mine =

Eloise copper mine
- Location in Queensland
- Location: Queensland, Australia; 20°57′11″S 140°58′43″E
- Products: Copper
- Company: AIC Mines
- Website: https://www.aicmines.com.au/

The Eloise Copper Mine is a copper mine located in northwest Queensland Australia, 60 kilometres (37 mi) southeast of Cloncurry and 50 kilometres (31 mi) of McKinlay, in the vicinity of Mount Isa.

The deposit was discovered in 1987, the mine has operated since 1996, and was on care and maintenance after 2008. Mining recommenced in early 2011.

In November 2021, AIC Mines acquired the Eloise copper mine from FMR Investments for $27 million.

== Transportation ==
The mine is nearby the Elrose Airport (IATA: ERQ, ICAO: YESE), named after the Elrose Homestead, and by both the Landsborough Highway and the Flinders Highway.
