= Elrose Airport =

Elrose station Airport
- IATA: ERQ; ICAO: YESE

Summary
- Airport type: Private
- Owner/Operator: Swiss farm holdings Australia
- Location: Elrose station, Queensland, Australia
- Elevation AMSL: 643 ft / 196 m
- Coordinates: 20°58′34″S 141°00′23″E

Map
- Location in Queensland

Runways
Direction	Length		Surface
Direction	m	ft	Surface
14/32	1,452	4,764	Gravel
- Sources: Australian AIP, GCM, STV

Elrose station Airport (IATA: ERQ, ICAO: YESE) is an airport that serves the Eloise Copper Mine in northwest Queensland, Australia, 70 kilometres (43 mi) southeast of Cloncurry and 50 kilometres (31 mi) of McKinlay, in the vicinity of Mount Isa.

== See also ==
- List of airports in Queensland
