= Bulgunnia Station =

Sheep station in north-western South Australia

Coordinates: 30°08′S 135°15′E

Location of Bulgunnia Station in South Australia

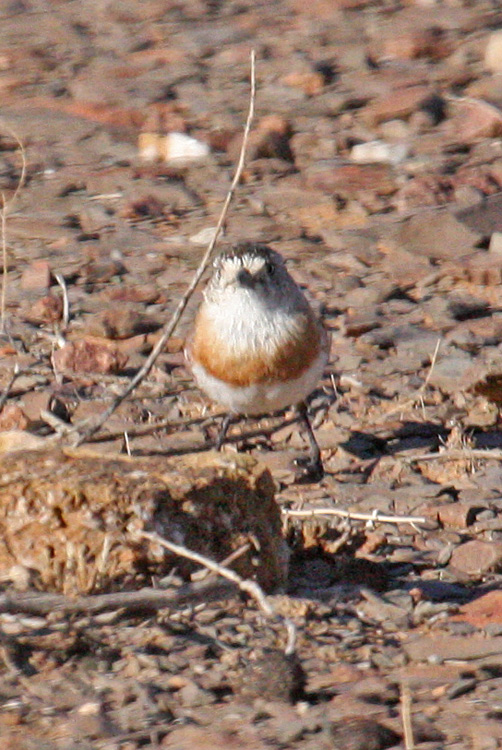
Bulgunnia is an important area for the chestnut-breasted whiteface

Bulgunnia Station is a 3,200-square-kilometre (1,236 sq mi) sheep station in north-western South Australia.

== Description ==
It lies 175 kilometres (109 mi) south-west of Coober Pedy and about 750 kilometres (466 mi) north-west of the state capital, Adelaide. It carries 26,000 Merino sheep and is operated by a staff of seven people. It is one of four adjoining properties operated by the Jumbuck Pastoral Company in the region. The climate at Bulgunnia is arid, with an annual average rainfall of 160 millimetres (6 in) and with daytime maximum temperatures ranging from about 18 °C in winter to the 40s in summer. In 2011 the area experienced heavy flooding; the managers, Shane and Cheryl Miller, had to grade a new road to access groceries after becoming isolated for a few days.

The land occupying the extent of the Bulgunnia Station pastoral lease was gazetted as a locality in April 2013 under the name "Mount Eba".

== Birds ==
Bulgunnia has been classified by BirdLife International as an Important Bird Area because it is a stronghold for the restricted-range and near-threatened chestnut-breasted whiteface as well as supporting the biome-restricted inland dotterel, Bourke's parrot, chiming wedgebill, cinnamon quail-thrush, pied honeyeater and thick-billed grasswren.

== See also ==
- List of ranches and stations
