= List of airports by IATA code: G =

This article includes a list of airports which have an IATA airport code beginning with the letter G.

IATA	ICAO	Airport name	Location served	Time	DST (Note: The DST column shows the months in which Daylight Saving Time, a.k.a. Summer Time, begins and ends. A blank DST box usually indicates that the location stays on Standard Time all year, although in some cases the location stays on Summer Time all year. If a location is currently on DST, add one hour to the time in the Time column)
-GA-
GAA		Guamal Airport	Guamal, Colombia	UTC−05:00	
GAB	KGAB	Gabbs Airport	Gabbs, Nevada, United States	UTC−08:00	Mar-Nov
GAC	MHGS	Gracias Airport	Gracias, Honduras	UTC−06:00	
GAD	KGAD	Northeast Alabama Regional Airport	Gadsden, Alabama, United States	UTC−06:00	Mar-Nov
GAE	DTTG	Gabès – Matmata International Airport	Gabès, Tunisia	UTC+01:00	
GAF	DTTF	Gafsa – Ksar International Airport	Gafsa, Tunisia	UTC+01:00	
GAG	KGAG	Gage Airport	Gage, Oklahoma, United States	UTC−06:00	Mar-Nov
GAH	YGAY	Gayndah Airport	Gayndah, Queensland, Australia	UTC+10:00	
GAI	KGAI	Montgomery County Airpark	Gaithersburg, Maryland, United States	UTC−05:00	Mar-Nov
GAJ	RJSC	Yamagata Airport (Junmachi Airport)	Yamagata, Honshu, Japan	UTC+09:00	
GAL	PAGA	Edward G. Pitka Sr. Airport	Galena, Alaska, United States	UTC−09:00	Mar-Nov
GAM	PAGM	Gambell Airport	Gambell, Alaska, United States	UTC−09:00	Mar-Nov
GAN	VRMG	Gan International Airport	Gan Island, Addu Atoll, Maldives	UTC+05:00	
GAO	MUGT	Mariana Grajales Airport	Guantánamo, Cuba	UTC−05:00	Mar-Nov
GAP	AYGP	Gusap Airport	Gusap, Papua New Guinea	UTC+10:00	
GAQ	GAGO	Gao International Airport (Korogoussou Airport)	Gao, Mali	UTC±00:00	
GAR	AYGI	Garaina Airport	Garaina, Papua New Guinea	UTC+10:00	
GAS	HKGA	Garissa Airport	Garissa, Kenya	UTC+03:00	
GAT	LFNA	Gap–Tallard Airport	Gap, Provence-Alpes-Côte d'Azur, France	UTC+01:00	Mar-Oct
GAU	VEGT	Lokpriya Gopinath Bordoloi International Airport	Guwahati, Assam, India	UTC+05:30	
GAV		Gag Island Airport	Gag Island, Indonesia	UTC+09:00	
GAW	VYGG	Gangaw Airport	Gangaw, Myanmar	UTC+06:30	
GAX		Gamba Airport	Gamba, Gabon	UTC+01:00	
GAY	VEGY	Gaya Airport (Bodhgaya Airport)	Gaya, Bihar, India	UTC+05:30	
GAZ		Guasopa Airport	Guasopa, Papua New Guinea	UTC+10:00	
-GB-
GBA	EGBP	Cotswold Airport	Kemble, England, United Kingdom	UTC±00:00	Mar-Oct
GBB	UBBQ	Qabala International Airport	Qabala, Azerbaijan	UTC+04:00	
GBC	AYGS	Gasuke Airport	Gasuke, Papua New Guinea	UTC+10:00	
GBD	KGBD	Great Bend Municipal Airport	Great Bend, Kansas, United States	UTC−06:00	Mar-Nov
GBE	FBSK	Sir Seretse Khama International Airport	Gaborone, Botswana	UTC+02:00	
GBF	AYNE	Negarbo Airport	Negarbo, Papua New Guinea	UTC+10:00	
GBG	KGBG	Galesburg Municipal Airport	Galesburg, Illinois, United States	UTC−06:00	Mar-Nov
GBH	PAGB	Galbraith Lake Airport	Galbraith Lake, Alaska, United States	UTC−09:00	Mar-Nov
GBI		Kalaburagi Airport	Gulbarga, Karnataka, India	UTC+05:30	
GBJ	TFFM	Marie-Galante Airport (Les Bases)	Grand-Bourg, Marie-Galante Island, Guadeloupe	UTC−04:00	
GBK	GFGK	Gbangbatok Airport	Gbangbatok, Sierra Leone	UTC±00:00	
GBL	YGBI	South Goulburn Island Airport	Goulburn Islands, Northern Territory, Australia	UTC+09:30	
GBM		Garbaharey Airport	Garbaharey, Somalia	UTC+03:00	
GBP	YGAM	Gamboola Airport	Gamboola, Queensland, Australia	UTC+10:00	
GBR	KGBR	Walter J. Koladza Airport	Great Barrington, Massachusetts, United States	UTC−05:00	Mar-Nov
GBT	OING	Gorgan Airport	Gorgan, Iran	UTC+03:30	Mar-Sep
GBU	HSKG	Khashm el Girba Airport	Khashm el Girba, Sudan	UTC+03:00	
GBV	YGIB	Gibb River Airport	Gibb River, Western Australia, Australia	UTC+08:00	
GBW	YGIA	Ginbata Airport	Ginbata, Western Australia, Australia	UTC+08:00	
GBZ	NZGB	Great Barrier Aerodrome	Great Barrier Island, New Zealand	UTC+12:00	Sep-Apr
-GC-
GCA		Guacamayas Airport	Guacamayas, Colombia	UTC−05:00	
GCC	KGCC	Gillette–Campbell County Airport	Gillette, Wyoming, United States	UTC−07:00	Mar-Nov
GCD		Grand Coulee Dam Airport (FAA: 3W7)	Electric City, Washington, United States	UTC−08:00	Mar-Nov
GCH	OIAH	Gachsaran Airport	Gachsaran, Iran	UTC+03:30	Mar-Sep
GCI	EGJB	Guernsey Airport	The Forest, Guernsey, Channel Islands	UTC±00:00	Mar-Oct
GCJ	FAGC	Grand Central Airport	Johannesburg, South Africa	UTC+02:00	
GCK	KGCK	Garden City Regional Airport	Garden City, Kansas, United States	UTC−06:00	Mar-Nov
GCM	MWCR	Owen Roberts International Airport	Grand Cayman, British Overseas Territory of Cayman Islands	UTC−05:00	
GCN	KGCN	Grand Canyon National Park Airport	Tusayan, Arizona, United States	UTC−07:00	
GCT		Grand Canyon Bar 10 Airport	Whitmore, Arizona, United States	UTC−07:00	
GCW		Grand Canyon West Airport (FAA: 1G4)	Peach Springs, Arizona, United States	UTC−07:00	
GCY	KGCY	Greeneville–Greene County Municipal Airport	Greeneville, Tennessee, United States	UTC−05:00	Mar-Nov
-GD-
GDA		Gounda Airport	Gounda, Central African Republic	UTC+01:00	
GDB	VAGD	Gondia Airport	Gondia, Maharashtra, India	UTC+05:30	
GDC	KGYH	Donaldson Center Airport (FAA: GYH)	Greenville, South Carolina, United States	UTC−05:00	Mar-Nov
GDD	YGDN	Gordon Downs Airport	Gordon Downs, Western Australia, Australia	UTC+08:00	
GDE	HAGO	Gode Airport	Gode, Ethiopia	UTC+03:00	
GDG	UHBI	Magdagachi Airport	Magdagachi, Amur Oblast, Russia	UTC+09:00	
GDH		Golden Horn Lodge Seaplane Base (FAA: 3Z8)	Golden Horn Lodge, Alaska, United States	UTC−09:00	Mar-Nov
GDI		Gordil Airport	Gordil, Central African Republic	UTC+01:00	
GDJ	FZWC	Gandajika Airport	Gandajika, Democratic Republic of the Congo	UTC+02:00	
GDL	MMGL	Guadalajara International Airport (Miguel Hidalgo y Costilla Int'l)	Guadalajara, Jalisco, Mexico	UTC−06:00	Apr-Oct
GDM	KGDM	Gardner Municipal Airport	Gardner, Massachusetts, United States	UTC−05:00	Mar-Nov
GDN	EPGD	Gdańsk Lech Wałęsa Airport	Gdańsk, Poland	UTC+01:00	Mar-Oct
GDO	SVGD	Guasdualito Airport (Vare Maria Airport)	Guasdualito, Venezuela	UTC−04:00	
GDP	SNGD	Guadalupe Airport	Guadalupe, Piauí, Brazil	UTC−03:00	
GDQ	HAGN	Gondar Airport (Atse Tewodros Airport)	Gondar, Ethiopia	UTC+03:00	
GDT	MBGT	JAGS McCartney International Airport (Grand Turk Int'l)	Grand Turk Island, British Overseas Territory of Turks and Caicos Islands	UTC−04:00	
GDV	KGDV	Dawson Community Airport	Glendive, Montana, United States	UTC−07:00	Mar-Nov
GDW	KGDW	Gladwin Zettel Memorial Airport	Gladwin, Michigan, United States	UTC−05:00	Mar-Nov
GDX	UHMM	Sokol Airport	Magadan, Magadan Oblast, Russia	UTC+11:00	
GDZ	URKG	Gelendzhik Airport	Gelendzhik, Krasnodar Krai, Russia	UTC+03:00	
-GE-
GEA	NWWM	Nouméa Magenta Airport	Nouméa, New Caledonia	UTC+11:00	
GEB	WAMJ	Gebe Airport	Gebe, Indonesia	UTC+09:00	
GEC		Geçitkale Air Base	Geçitkale, Northern Cyprus	UTC+03:00	
GED	KGED	Delaware Coastal Airport	Georgetown, Delaware, United States	UTC−05:00	Mar-Nov
GEE	YGTO	George Town Aerodrome	George Town, Tasmania, Australia	UTC+10:00	Oct-Apr
GEF	AGEV	Geva Airport	Liangai, Vella Lavella, Solomon Islands	UTC+11:00	
GEG	KGEG	Spokane International Airport	Spokane, Washington, United States	UTC−08:00	Mar-Nov
GEL	SBNM	Sepé Tiaraju Airport	Santo Ângelo, Rio Grande do Sul, Brazil	UTC−03:00	
GEM	FGMY	President Obiang Nguema International Airport	Mengomeyén, Equatorial Guinea	UTC+01:00	
GEO	SYCJ	Cheddi Jagan International Airport	Georgetown, Guyana	UTC−04:00	
GER	MUNG	Rafael Cabrera Mustelier Airport	Nueva Gerona, Cuba	UTC−05:00	Mar-Nov
GES	RPMR	General Santos International Airport (Tambler Airport)	General Santos, Philippines	UTC+08:00	
GET	YGEL	Geraldton Airport	Geraldton, Western Australia, Australia	UTC+08:00	
GEV	ESNG	Gällivare Airport	Gällivare, Sweden	UTC+01:00	Mar-Oct
GEW	AYGC	Gewoia Airport	Gewoia, Papua New Guinea	UTC+10:00	
GEX	YGLG	Geelong Airport	Geelong, Victoria, Australia	UTC+10:00	Oct-Apr
GEY	KGEY	South Big Horn County Airport	Greybull, Wyoming, United States	UTC−07:00	Mar-Nov
-GF-
GFD	KGFD	Pope Field	Greenfield, Indiana, United States	UTC−05:00	Mar-Nov
GFE		Grenfell Airport	Grenfell, New South Wales, Australia	UTC+10:00	Oct-Apr
GFF	YGTH	Griffith Airport	Griffith, New South Wales, Australia	UTC+10:00	Oct-Apr
GFK	KGFK	Grand Forks International Airport	Grand Forks, North Dakota, United States	UTC−06:00	Mar-Nov
GFL	KGFL	Floyd Bennett Memorial Airport	Glens Falls, New York, United States	UTC−05:00	Mar-Nov
GFN	YGFN	Clarence Valley Regional Airport	Grafton, New South Wales, Australia	UTC+10:00	Oct-Apr
GFO	SYBT	Bartica Airport	Bartica, Guyana	UTC−04:00	
GFR	LFRF	Granville–Mont-Saint-Michel Aerodrome	Granville, Lower Normandy, France	UTC+01:00	Mar-Oct
GFY	FYGF	Grootfontein Air Base	Grootfontein, Namibia	UTC+01:00	Sep-Apr
-GG-
GGB	SWHP	Água Boa Airport	Água Boa, Mato Grosso, Brazil	UTC−03:00	
GGC		Lumbala N'guimbo Airport	Lumbala N'guimbo, Angola	UTC+01:00	
GGD	YGDS	Gregory Downs Airport	Gregory Downs, Queensland, Australia	UTC+10:00	
GGE	KGGE	Georgetown County Airport	Georgetown, South Carolina, United States	UTC−05:00	Mar-Nov
GGF	SNYA	Almeirim Airport	Almeirim, Pará, Brazil	UTC−03:00	
GGG	KGGG	East Texas Regional Airport	Longview, Texas, United States	UTC−06:00	Mar-Nov
GGH	SSCT	Gastão Mesquita Airport	Cianorte, Paraná, Brazil	UTC−03:00	
GGJ	SSGY	Guaíra Airport	Guaíra, Paraná, Brazil	UTC−03:00	
GGL		Gilgal Airport	Gilgal, Colombia	UTC−05:00	
GGM	HKKG	Kakamega Airport	Kakamega, Kenya	UTC+03:00	
GGN	DIGA	Gagnoa Airport	Gagnoa, Ivory Coast	UTC±00:00	
GGO	DIGL	Guiglo Airport	Guiglo, Ivory Coast	UTC±00:00	
GGR		Garowe International Airport	Garowe, Somalia	UTC+03:00	
GGS	SAWR	Gobernador Gregores Airport	Gobernador Gregores, Santa Cruz, Argentina	UTC−03:00	
GGT	MYEF	Exuma International Airport	Moss Town, Great Exuma Island, Bahamas	UTC−05:00	Mar-Nov
GGW	KGGW	Glasgow Airport (Wokal Field)	Glasgow, Montana, United States	UTC−07:00	Mar-Nov
-GH-
GHA	DAUG	Noumérat – Moufdi Zakaria Airport	Ghardaïa, Algeria	UTC+01:00	
GHB	MYEM	Governor's Harbour Airport	Governor's Harbour, Eleuthera Island, Bahamas	UTC−05:00	Mar-Nov
GHC	MYBG	Great Harbour Cay Airport	Great Harbour Cay, Berry Islands, Bahamas	UTC−05:00	Mar-Nov
GHE		Garachiné Airport	Garachiné, Panama	UTC−05:00	
GHF	ETEU	Giebelstadt Airport	Giebelstadt, Bavaria, Germany	UTC+01:00	Mar-Oct
GHK		Gahcho Kue Aerodrome (TC: CGK2)	Kennedy Lake, Northwest Territories, Canada	UTC−07:00	Mar-Nov
GHM	KGHM	Centerville Municipal Airport	Centerville, Tennessee, United States	UTC−06:00	Mar-Nov
GHN	ZUGH	Guanghan Airport	Guanghan, Sichuan, China	UTC+08:00	
GHS	WALE	West Kutai Melalan Airport	Melak, East Kalimantan, Indonesia	UTC+09:00	
GHT	HLGT	Ghat Airport	Ghat, Libya	UTC+02:00	
GHU	SAAG	Gualeguaychú Airport	Gualeguaychú, Entre Ríos, Argentina	UTC−03:00	
GHV	LRBV	Brașov-Ghimbav International Airport	Brașov, Romania	UTC+02:00	Mar-Oct
-GI-
GIB	LXGB	Gibraltar International Airport (North Front Airport)	British Overseas Territory of Gibraltar	UTC+01:00	Mar-Oct
GIC	YBOI	Boigu Island Airport	Boigu Island, Queensland, Australia	UTC+10:00	
GID	HBBE	Gitega Airport	Gitega, Burundi	UTC+02:00	
GIF	KGIF	Winter Haven's Gilbert Airport	Winter Haven, Florida, United States	UTC−05:00	Mar-Nov
GIG	SBGL	Rio de Janeiro–Galeão International Airport	Rio de Janeiro, Brazil	UTC−03:00	
GII	GUSI	Siguiri Airport	Siguiri, Guinea	UTC±00:00	
GIL	OPGT	Gilgit Airport	Gilgit, Pakistan	UTC+05:00	
GIM		Miele Mimbale Airport	Miele Mimbale, Gabon	UTC+01:00	
GIR	SKGI	Santiago Vila Airport	Girardot, Colombia	UTC−05:00	
GIS	NZGS	Gisborne Airport	Gisborne, New Zealand	UTC+12:00	Sep-Apr
GIT	HTGE	Geita Airport	Geita, Tanzania	UTC+03:00	
GIU	VCCS	Sigiriya Airport	Dambulla, Sri Lanka	UTC+05:30	
GIY	FAGI	Giyani Airport	Giyani, South Africa	UTC+02:00	
GIZ	OEGN	Jizan Regional Airport (King Abdullah bin Abdulaziz Airport)	Jizan, Saudi Arabia	UTC+03:00	
-GJ-
GJA	MHNJ	Guanaja Airport	Guanaja, Honduras	UTC−06:00	
GJL	DAAV	Jijel Ferhat Abbas Airport	Jijel, Algeria	UTC+01:00	
GJM	SBGM	Guajará-Mirim Airport	Guajará-Mirim, Rondônia, Brazil	UTC−04:00	
GJR	BIGJ	Gjögur Airport	Gjögur, Iceland	UTC±00:00	
GJT	KGJT	Grand Junction Regional Airport (Walker Field)	Grand Junction, Colorado, United States	UTC−07:00	Mar-Nov
-GK-
GKA	AYGA	Goroka Airport	Goroka, Papua New Guinea	UTC+10:00	
GKD	LTFK	Gökçeada Airport	Gökçeada, Turkey	UTC+03:00	
GKE	ETNG	NATO Air Base Geilenkirchen	Geilenkirchen, North Rhine-Westphalia, Germany	UTC+01:00	Mar-Oct
GKH	VNGK	Palungtar Airport	Gorkha, Nepal	UTC+05:45	
GKK	VRMO	Kooddoo Airport	Kooddoo, Gaafu Alif Atoll, Maldives	UTC+05:00	
GKL	YGKL	Great Keppel Island Airport	Great Keppel Island, Queensland, Australia	UTC+10:00	
GKN	PAGK	Gulkana Airport	Gulkana, Alaska, United States	UTC−09:00	Mar-Nov
GKO		Kongo Boumba Airport	Kongo Boumba, Gabon	UTC+01:00	
GKT	KGKT	Gatlinburg–Pigeon Forge Airport	Sevierville, Tennessee, United States	UTC−05:00	Mar-Nov
-GL-
GLA	EGPF	Glasgow Airport	Glasgow, Scotland, United Kingdom	UTC±00:00	Mar-Oct
GLB		San Carlos Apache Airport (FAA: P13)	Globe, Arizona, United States	UTC−07:00	
GLC		Geladi Airport	Geladi, Ethiopia	UTC+03:00	
GLD	KGLD	Goodland Municipal Airport (Renner Field)	Goodland, Kansas, United States	UTC−07:00	Mar-Nov
GLE	KGLE	Gainesville Municipal Airport	Gainesville, Texas, United States	UTC−06:00	Mar-Nov
GLF	MRGF	Golfito Airport	Golfito, Costa Rica	UTC−06:00	
GLG	YGLE	Glengyle Airport	Glengyle, Queensland, Australia	UTC+10:00	
GLH	KGLH	Mid-Delta Regional Airport	Greenville, Mississippi, United States	UTC−06:00	Mar-Nov
GLI	YGLI	Glen Innes Airport	Glen Innes, New South Wales, Australia	UTC+10:00	Oct-Apr
GLK	HCMR	Abdullahi Yusuf International Airport	Galkayo, Somalia	UTC+03:00	
GLL	ENKL	Gol Airport, Klanten	Gol, Norway	UTC+01:00	Mar-Oct
GLM	YGLO	Glenormiston Airport	Glenormiston, Queensland, Australia	UTC+10:00	
GLN		Guelmim Airport	Guelmim, Morocco	UTC±00:00	Mar-Oct (Note: Morocco temporarily suspends DST for the month of Ramadan)
GLO	EGBJ	Gloucestershire Airport	Gloucester / Cheltenham, England, United Kingdom	UTC±00:00	Mar-Oct
GLP	AYUP	Gulgubip Airport	Gulgubip, Papua New Guinea	UTC+10:00	
GLR	KGLR	Gaylord Regional Airport	Gaylord, Michigan, United States	UTC−05:00	Mar-Nov
GLS	KGLS	Scholes International Airport at Galveston	Galveston, Texas, United States	UTC−06:00	Mar-Nov
GLT	YGLA	Gladstone Airport	Gladstone, Queensland, Australia	UTC+10:00	
GLU	VQGP	Gelephu Airport	Gelephu, Bhutan	UTC+06:00	
GLV	PAGL	Golovin Airport	Golovin, Alaska, United States	UTC−09:00	Mar-Nov
GLW	KGLW	Glasgow Municipal Airport	Glasgow, Kentucky, United States	UTC−06:00	Mar-Nov
GLX	WAMA	Gamar Malamo Airport	Galela, Indonesia	UTC+09:00	
GLY		Goldsworthy Airport	Goldsworthy, Western Australia, Australia	UTC+08:00	
GLZ	EHGR	Gilze-Rijen Air Base	Breda, Netherlands	UTC+01:00	Mar-Oct
-GM-
GMA	FZFK	Gemena Airport	Gemena, Democratic Republic of the Congo	UTC+01:00	
GMB	HAGM	Gambela Airport	Gambela, Ethiopia	UTC+03:00	
GMC		Guerima Airport	Guerima, Colombia	UTC−05:00	
GMD	GMMB	Ben Slimane Airport	Ben Slimane, Morocco	UTC±00:00	Mar-Oct^{1}
GME	UMGG	Gomel Airport	Gomel, Belarus	UTC+03:00	
GMI	AYGT	Gasmata Airport	Gasmata, Papua New Guinea	UTC+10:00	
GMM	FCOG	Gamboma Airport	Gamboma, Republic of the Congo	UTC+01:00	
GMN	NZGM	Greymouth Airport	Greymouth, New Zealand	UTC+12:00	Sep-Apr
GMO	DNGO	Gombe Lawanti International Airport	Gombe, Nigeria	UTC+01:00	
GMP	RKSS	Gimpo International Airport	Seoul, South Korea	UTC+09:00	
GMQ	ZLGL	Golog Maqin Airport	Golog, Qinghai, China	UTC+08:00	
GMR	NTGJ	Totegegie Airport (Gambier Island Airport)	Mangareva, Gambier Islands, French Polynesia	UTC−09:00	
GMS	SNGM	Guimarães Airport	Guimarães, Maranhão, Brazil	UTC−03:00	
GMT	PAGZ	Granite Mountain Air Station (FAA: GSZ)	Granite Mountain, Alaska, United States	UTC−09:00	Mar-Nov
GMU	KGMU	Greenville Downtown Airport	Greenville, South Carolina, United States	UTC−05:00	Mar-Nov
GMV		Monument Valley Airport (FAA: UT25)	Monument Valley, Utah, United States	UTC−07:00	Mar-Nov
GMZ	GCGM	La Gomera Airport	La Gomera / Canary Islands, Spain	UTC±00:00	Mar-Oct
-GN-
GNA	UMMG	Grodno Airport	Grodno, Belarus	UTC+03:00	
GNB	LFLS	Grenoble–Isère Airport	Grenoble, Rhône-Alpes, France	UTC+01:00	Mar-Oct
GND	TGPY	Maurice Bishop International Airport	St. George's, Grenada	UTC−04:00	
GNF		Gansner Field (FAA: 2O1)	Quincy, California, United States	UTC−08:00	Mar-Nov
GNG	KGNG	Gooding Municipal Airport	Gooding, Idaho, United States	UTC−07:00	Mar-Nov
GNI	RCGI	Lyudao Airport (Green Island Airport)	Lyudao (Green Island), Taiwan	UTC+08:00	
GNJ	UBBG	Ganja International Airport	Ganja, Azerbaijan	UTC+04:00	
GNM	SNGI	Guanambi Airport	Guanambi, Bahia, Brazil	UTC−03:00	
GNN	HAGH	Ginir Airport	Ginir, Ethiopia	UTC+03:00	
GNR	SAHR	Dr. Arturo Umberto Illia Airport	General Roca, Río Negro, Argentina	UTC−03:00	
GNS	WIMB	Binaka Airport	Gunungsitoli, Indonesia	UTC+07:00	
GNT	KGNT	Grants-Milan Municipal Airport	Grants, New Mexico, United States	UTC−07:00	Mar-Nov
GNU		Goodnews Airport	Goodnews Bay, Alaska, United States	UTC−09:00	Mar-Nov
GNV	KGNV	Gainesville Regional Airport	Gainesville, Florida, United States	UTC−05:00	Mar-Nov
GNY	LTCS	Şanlıurfa GAP Airport	Şanlıurfa, Turkey	UTC+03:00	
GNZ	FBGZ	Ghanzi Airport	Ghanzi, Botswana	UTC+02:00	
-GO-
GOA	LIMJ	Genoa Cristoforo Colombo Airport	Genoa, Liguria, Italy	UTC+01:00	Mar-Oct
GOB	HAGB	Robe Airport	Goba, Ethiopia	UTC+03:00	
GOC	AYGX	Gora Airport	Gora, Papua New Guinea	UTC+10:00	
GOE		Gonaili Airstrip	Gonaili, Papua New Guinea	UTC+10:00	
GOG	FYGB	Gobabis Airport	Gobabis, Namibia	UTC+01:00	Sep-Apr
GOH	BGGH	Nuuk Airport	Nuuk, Greenland	UTC−03:00	Mar-Oct
GOI	VOGO	Dabolim Airport	Dabolim, Goa, India	UTC+05:30	
GOJ	UWGG	Nizhny Novgorod International Airport (Strigino Airport)	Nizhny Novgorod, Nizhny Novgorod Oblast, Russia	UTC+03:00	
GOK	KGOK	Guthrie–Edmond Regional Airport	Guthrie, Oklahoma, United States	UTC−06:00	Mar-Nov
GOL		Gold Beach Municipal Airport (FAA: 4S1)	Gold Beach, Oregon, United States	UTC−08:00	Mar-Nov
GOM	FZNA	Goma International Airport	Goma, Democratic Republic of the Congo	UTC+02:00	
GON	KGON	Groton–New London Airport	Groton / New London, Connecticut, United States	UTC−05:00	Mar-Nov
GOO	YGDI	Goondiwindi Airport	Goondiwindi, Queensland, Australia	UTC+10:00	
GOP	VEGK	Gorakhpur Airport	Gorakhpur, Uttar Pradesh, India	UTC+05:30	
GOQ	ZLGM	Golmud Airport	Golmud, Qinghai, China	UTC+08:00	
GOR	HAGR	Gore Airport	Gore, Ethiopia	UTC+03:00	
GOS		Gosford Airport	Gosford, New South Wales, Australia	UTC+10:00	Oct-Apr
GOT	ESGG	Göteborg Landvetter Airport	Gothenburg, Sweden	UTC+01:00	Mar-Oct
GOU	FKKR	Garoua International Airport	Garoua, Cameroon	UTC+01:00	
GOV	YPGV	Gove Airport	Nhulunbuy, Northern Territory, Australia	UTC+09:30	
GOX	VOGA	Manohar International Airport	Mopa, Goa, India	UTC+05:30	
GOZ	LBGO	Gorna Oryahovitsa Airport	Gorna Oryahovitsa, Bulgaria	UTC+02:00	Mar-Oct
-GP-
GPA	LGRX	Araxos Airport	Patras, Greece	UTC+02:00	Mar-Oct
GPB	SBGU	Tancredo Thomas de Faria Airport	Guarapuava, Paraná, Brazil	UTC−03:00	
GPD	YGON	Mount Gordon Airport	Mount Gordon Mine, Queensland, Australia	UTC+10:00	
GPI	SKGP	Guapi Airport (Juan Casiano Airport)	Guapi, Colombia	UTC−05:00	
GPL	MRGP	Guápiles Airport	Guápiles, Costa Rica	UTC−06:00	
GPN	YGPT	Garden Point Airport	Pularumpi, Northern Territory, Australia	UTC+09:30	
GPO	SAZG	General Pico Airport	General Pico, La Pampa, Argentina	UTC−03:00	
GPS	SEGS	Seymour Airport	Baltra Island, Galápagos Islands, Ecuador	UTC−06:00	
GPT	KGPT	Gulfport–Biloxi International Airport	Gulfport / Biloxi, Mississippi, United States	UTC−06:00	Mar-Nov
GPZ	KGPZ	Grand Rapids–Itasca County Airport (Gordon Newstrom Field)	Grand Rapids, Minnesota, United States	UTC−06:00	Mar-Nov
-GQ-
GQQ	KGQQ	Galion Municipal Airport	Galion, Ohio, United States	UTC−05:00	Mar-Nov
-GR-
GRA		Gamarra Airport	Gamarra, Colombia	UTC−05:00	
GRB	KGRB	Austin Straubel International Airport	Green Bay, Wisconsin, United States	UTC−06:00	Mar-Nov
GRC		Grand Cess Airport	Grand Cess, Liberia	UTC±00:00	
GRD	KGRD	Greenwood County Airport	Greenwood, South Carolina, United States	UTC−05:00	Mar-Nov
GRE	KGRE	Greenville Airport	Greenville, Illinois, United States	UTC−06:00	Mar-Nov
GRF	KGRF	Gray Army Airfield	Tacoma, Washington, United States	UTC−08:00	Mar-Nov
GRG	OAGZ	Gardez Airport	Gardez, Afghanistan	UTC+04:30	
GRH		Garuahi Airport	Garuahi, Papua New Guinea	UTC+10:00	
GRI	KGRI	Central Nebraska Regional Airport	Grand Island, Nebraska, United States	UTC−06:00	Mar-Nov
GRJ	FAGG	George Airport	George, South Africa	UTC+02:00	
GRK	KGRK	Killeen Regional Airport / Robert Gray Army Airfield	Fort Hood / Killeen, Texas, United States	UTC−06:00	Mar-Nov
GRL	AYGG	Garasa Airport	Garasa, Papua New Guinea	UTC+10:00	
GRM	KCKC	Grand Marais/Cook County Airport (FAA: CKC)	Grand Marais, Minnesota, United States	UTC−06:00	Mar-Nov
GRN	KGRN	Gordon Municipal Airport	Gordon, Nebraska, United States	UTC−07:00	Mar-Nov
GRO	LEGE	Girona–Costa Brava Airport	Girona, Catalonia, Spain	UTC+01:00	Mar-Oct
GRP	SWGI	Gurupi Airport	Gurupi, Tocantins, Brazil	UTC−03:00	
GRQ	EHGG	Groningen Airport Eelde	Groningen, Netherlands	UTC+01:00	Mar-Oct
GRR	KGRR	Gerald R. Ford International Airport	Grand Rapids, Michigan, United States	UTC−05:00	Mar-Nov
GRS	LIRS	Grosseto Airport	Grosseto, Tuscany, Italy	UTC+01:00	Mar-Oct
GRT		Gujrat Airport	Gujrat, Pakistan	UTC+05:00	
GRU	SBGR	São Paulo/Guarulhos–Governador André Franco Montoro International Airport	São Paulo, Brazil	UTC−03:00	
GRV	URMG	Grozny Airport	Grozny, Chechnya, Russia	UTC+03:00	
GRW	LPGR	Graciosa Airport	Graciosa, Azores, Portugal	UTC−01:00	Mar-Oct
GRX	LEGR	Federico García Lorca Airport (Granada Jaén Airport)	Granada, Andalusia, Spain	UTC+01:00	Mar-Oct
GRY	BIGR	Grímsey Airport	Grímsey, Iceland	UTC±00:00	
GRZ	LOWG	Graz Airport	Graz, Austria	UTC+01:00	Mar-Oct
-GS-
GSA	WBKN	Long Pasia Airport	Long Pasia, Sabah, Malaysia	UTC+08:00	
GSB	KGSB	Seymour Johnson Air Force Base	Goldsboro, North Carolina, United States	UTC−05:00	Mar-Nov
GSC	YGSC	Gascoyne Junction Airport	Gascoyne Junction, Western Australia, Australia	UTC+08:00	
GSE	ESGP	Göteborg City Airport	Gothenburg, Sweden	UTC+01:00	Mar-Oct
GSH	KGSH	Goshen Municipal Airport	Goshen, Indiana, United States	UTC−05:00	Mar-Nov
GSI	SOGS	Grand-Santi Airport	Grand-Santi, French Guiana	UTC−03:00	
GSJ	MGSJ	San José Airport	Puerto San José, Guatemala	UTC−06:00	
GSL		Taltheilei Narrows Airport (TC: CFA7)	Taltheilei Narrows, Northwest Territories, Canada	UTC−07:00	Mar-Nov
GSM	OIKQ	Dayrestan Airport (Qeshm International Airport)	Qeshm, Iran	UTC+03:30	Mar-Sep
GSN	YMGN	Mount Gunson Airport	Mount Gunson, South Australia, Australia	UTC+09:30	Oct-Apr
GSO	KGSO	Piedmont Triad International Airport	Greensboro, North Carolina, United States	UTC−05:00	Mar-Nov
GSP	KGSP	Greenville–Spartanburg International Airport	Greenville / Spartanburg, South Carolina, United States	UTC−05:00	Mar-Nov
GSQ	HEOW	Sharq Al-Owainat Airport	Sharq Al-Owainat, Egypt	UTC+02:00	
GSR	HCMG	Qardho Airport	Qardho, Somalia	UTC+03:00	
GSS		Sabi Sabi Airport	Sabie, South Africa	UTC+02:00	
GST	PAGS	Gustavus Airport	Gustavus, Alaska, United States	UTC−09:00	Mar-Nov
GSU	HSGF	Azaza Airport	Gedaref, Sudan	UTC+03:00	
GSV		Saratov Gagarin Airport	Saratov, Saratov Oblast, Russia	UTC+04:00	
-GT-
GTA	AGOK	Gatokae Aerodrome	Gatokae, Solomon Islands	UTC+11:00	
GTE	YGTE	Groote Eylandt Airport	Groote Eylandt, Northern Territory, Australia	UTC+09:30	
GTF	KGTF	Great Falls International Airport	Great Falls, Montana, United States	UTC−07:00	Mar-Nov
GTG	KGTG	Grantsburg Municipal Airport	Grantsburg, Wisconsin, United States	UTC−06:00	Mar-Nov
GTI	EDCG	Rügen Airport (Güttin Airfield)	Güttin, Mecklenburg-Vorpommern, Germany	UTC+01:00	Mar-Oct
GTN	NZGT	Glentanner Aerodrome	Mount Cook, New Zealand	UTC+12:00	Sep-Apr
GTO	WAMG	Jalaluddin Airport	Gorontalo, Indonesia	UTC+08:00	
GTP		Grants Pass Airport (FAA: 3S8)	Grants Pass, Oregon, United States	UTC−08:00	Mar-Nov
GTR	KGTR	Golden Triangle Regional Airport	Columbus / West Point / Starkville, Mississippi, United States	UTC−06:00	Mar-Nov
GTS	YTGT	The Granites Airport	The Granites, Northern Territory, Australia	UTC+09:30	
GTT	YGTN	Georgetown Airport	Georgetown, Queensland, Australia	UTC+10:00	
GTW	LKHO	Holešov Airport	Zlín, Czech Republic	UTC+01:00	Mar-Oct
GTY		Gettysburg Regional Airport (FAA: W05)	Gettysburg, Pennsylvania, United States	UTC−05:00	Mar-Nov
GTZ		Kirawira B Airstrip	Grumeti, Tanzania	UTC+03:00	
-GU-
GUA	MGGT	La Aurora International Airport	Guatemala City, Guatemala	UTC−06:00	
GUB	MMGR	Guerrero Negro Airport	Guerrero Negro, Baja California Sur, (Note: Airport is located in the neighboring state of Baja California.) Mexico	UTC−07:00	Apr-Oct
GUC	KGUC	Gunnison–Crested Butte Regional Airport	Gunnison, Colorado, United States	UTC−07:00	Mar-Nov
GUD	GAGM	Goundam Airport	Goundam, Mali	UTC±00:00	
GUE		Guriaso Airport	Guriaso, Papua New Guinea	UTC+10:00	
GUF	KJKA	Jack Edwards Airport (FAA: JKA)	Gulf Shores, Alabama, United States	UTC−06:00	Mar-Nov
GUG	AYGF	Guari Airport	Guari, Papua New Guinea	UTC+10:00	
GUH	YGDH	Gunnedah Airport	Gunnedah, New South Wales, Australia	UTC+10:00	Oct-Apr
GUI	SVGI	Güiria Airport	Güiria, Venezuela	UTC−04:00	
GUJ	SBGW	Guaratinguetá Airport	Guaratinguetá, São Paulo, Brazil	UTC−03:00	
GUL	YGLB	Goulburn Airport	Goulburn, New South Wales, Australia	UTC+10:00	Oct-Apr
GUM	PGUM	Antonio B. Won Pat International Airport (Guam Int'l)	Hagåtña, Guam	UTC+10:00	
GUP	KGUP	Gallup Municipal Airport	Gallup, New Mexico, United States	UTC−07:00	Mar-Nov
GUQ	SVGU	Guanare Airport	Guanare, Venezuela	UTC−04:00	
GUR	AYGN	Gurney Airport	Alotau, Papua New Guinea	UTC+10:00	
GUS	KGUS	Grissom Air Reserve Base	Peru, Indiana, United States	UTC−05:00	Mar-Nov
GUT	ETUO	RAF Gütersloh	Gütersloh, North Rhine-Westphalia, Germany	UTC+01:00	Mar-Oct
GUU	BIGF	Grundarfjörður Airport	Grundarfjörður, Iceland	UTC±00:00	
GUV	AYML	Mougulu Airport	Mougulu, Papua New Guinea	UTC+10:00	
GUW	UATG	Atyrau Airport	Atyrau, Kazakhstan	UTC+05:00	
GUX	VAGN	Guna Airport	Guna, Madhya Pradesh, India	UTC+05:30	
GUY	KGUY	Guymon Municipal Airport	Guymon, Oklahoma, United States	UTC−06:00	Mar-Nov
GUZ	SNGA	Guarapari Airport	Guarapari, Espírito Santo, Brazil	UTC−03:00	
-GV-
GVA	LSGG	Geneva Airport	Geneva, Switzerland	UTC+01:00	Mar-Oct
GVE	KGVE	Gordonsville Municipal Airport	Gordonsville, Virginia, United States	UTC−05:00	Mar-Nov
GVI	AYGV	Green River Airport	Green River, Papua New Guinea	UTC+10:00	
GVL	KGVL	Lee Gilmer Memorial Airport	Gainesville, Georgia, United States	UTC−05:00	Mar-Nov
GVN	UHKM	Sovetskaya Gavan Airport	Sovetskaya Gavan, Khabarovsk Krai, Russia	UTC+10:00	
GVP	YGNV	Greenvale Airport	Greenvale, Queensland, Australia	UTC+10:00	
GVR	SBGV	Coronel Altino Machado de Oliveira Airport	Governador Valadares, Minas Gerais, Brazil	UTC−03:00	
GVT	KGVT	Majors Airport	Greenville, Texas, United States	UTC−06:00	Mar-Nov
GVX	ESSK	Gävle-Sandviken Airport	Gävle, Sweden	UTC+01:00	Mar-Oct
-GW-
GWA	VYGW	Gwa Airport	Gwa, Myanmar	UTC+06:30	
GWD	OPGD	New Gwadar International Airport	Gwadar, Pakistan	UTC+05:00	
GWE	FVTL	Thornhill Air Base	Gweru, Zimbabwe	UTC+02:00	
GWL	VIGR	Rajmata Vijaya Raje Scindia Airport (Gwalior Airport)	Gwalior, Madhya Pradesh, India	UTC+05:30	
GWN		Gnarowein Airport	Gnarowein, Papua New Guinea	UTC+10:00	
GWO	KGWO	Greenwood–Leflore Airport	Greenwood, Mississippi, United States	UTC−06:00	Mar-Nov
GWS	KGWS	Glenwood Springs Municipal Airport	Glenwood Springs, Colorado, United States	UTC−07:00	Mar-Nov
GWT	EDXW	Sylt Airport (Westerland Airport)	Sylt, Schleswig-Holstein, Germany	UTC+01:00	Mar-Oct
GWV		Glendale Fokker Field (FAA: WV66)	Glen Dale, West Virginia, United States	UTC−05:00	Mar-Nov
GWY	EICM	Galway Airport	Galway, Ireland	UTC±00:00	Mar-Oct
-GX-
GXA	WAOM	Beringin Airport	North Barito, Central Kalimantan, Indonesia	UTC+09:00	
GXF	OYSY	Sayun Airport	Sayun, Yemen	UTC+03:00	
GXG	FNNG	Negage Airport	Negage, Angola	UTC+01:00	
GXH	ZLXH	Gannan Xiahe Airport	Xiahe, Gansu, China	UTC+08:00	
GXQ	SCCY	Teniente Vidal Airfield	Coyhaique, Chile	UTC−04:00	Aug-May
GXX	FKKJ	Yagoua Airport	Yagoua, Cameroon	UTC+01:00	
GXY	KGXY	Greeley–Weld County Airport	Greeley, Colorado, United States	UTC−07:00	Mar-Nov
-GY-
GYA	SLGY	Guayaramerín Airport	Guayaramerín, Bolivia	UTC−04:00	
GYD	UBBB	Heydar Aliyev International Airport	Baku, Azerbaijan	UTC+04:00	
GYE	SEGU	José Joaquín de Olmedo International Airport	Guayaquil, Ecuador	UTC−05:00	
GYG	UEMM	Magan Airport	Magan, Yakutia, Russia	UTC+09:00	
GYI	HRYG	Gisenyi Airport	Gisenyi, Rwanda	UTC+02:00	
GYL	YARG	Argyle Airport	Argyle, Western Australia, Australia	UTC+08:00	
GYM	MMGM	General José María Yáñez International Airport	Guaymas, Sonora, Mexico	UTC−07:00	
GYN	SBGO	Santa Genoveva Airport	Goiânia, Goiás, Brazil	UTC−03:00	
GYP	YGYM	Gympie Airport	Gympie, Queensland, Australia	UTC+10:00	
GYR	KGYR	Phoenix Goodyear Airport	Goodyear, Arizona, United States	UTC−07:00	
GYS	ZUGU	Guangyuan Panlong Airport	Guangyuan, Sichuan, China	UTC+08:00	
GYU	ZLGY	Guyuan Liupanshan Airport	Guyuan, Ningxia, China	UTC+08:00	
GYZ	YGRM	Gruyere Airport	Gruyere, Western Australia, Australia	UTC+08:00	
-GZ-
GZA	LVGZ	Yasser Arafat International Airport	Gaza, Palestine	UTC+02:00	Mar-Sep
GZG	ZUGZ	Garze Gesar Airport	Garzê County, Sichuan, China		
GZI	OAGN	Ghazni Airport	Ghazni, Afghanistan	UTC+04:30	
GZO	AGGN	Nusatupe Airport	Gizo, Western Province, Solomon Islands	UTC+11:00	
GZP	LTFG	Gazipaşa–Alanya Airport	Gazipaşa, Turkey	UTC+03:00	
GZT	LTAJ	Gaziantep Oğuzeli International Airport	Gaziantep, Turkey	UTC+03:00	
GZW	OIIK	Qazvin Airport	Qazvin, Iran	UTC+03:30	Mar-Sep
