= GDJ =

GDJ may refer to:

- IATA code for Gandajika Airport, Democratic Republic of the Congo
- FAA code for Granbury Regional Airport, Texas, United States
- Postal code for Gudja, Malta
- ISO 639-3 code for the Gurdjar language, an extinct language of Australia
