= Granbury Regional Airport =

Airport in Texas, United States

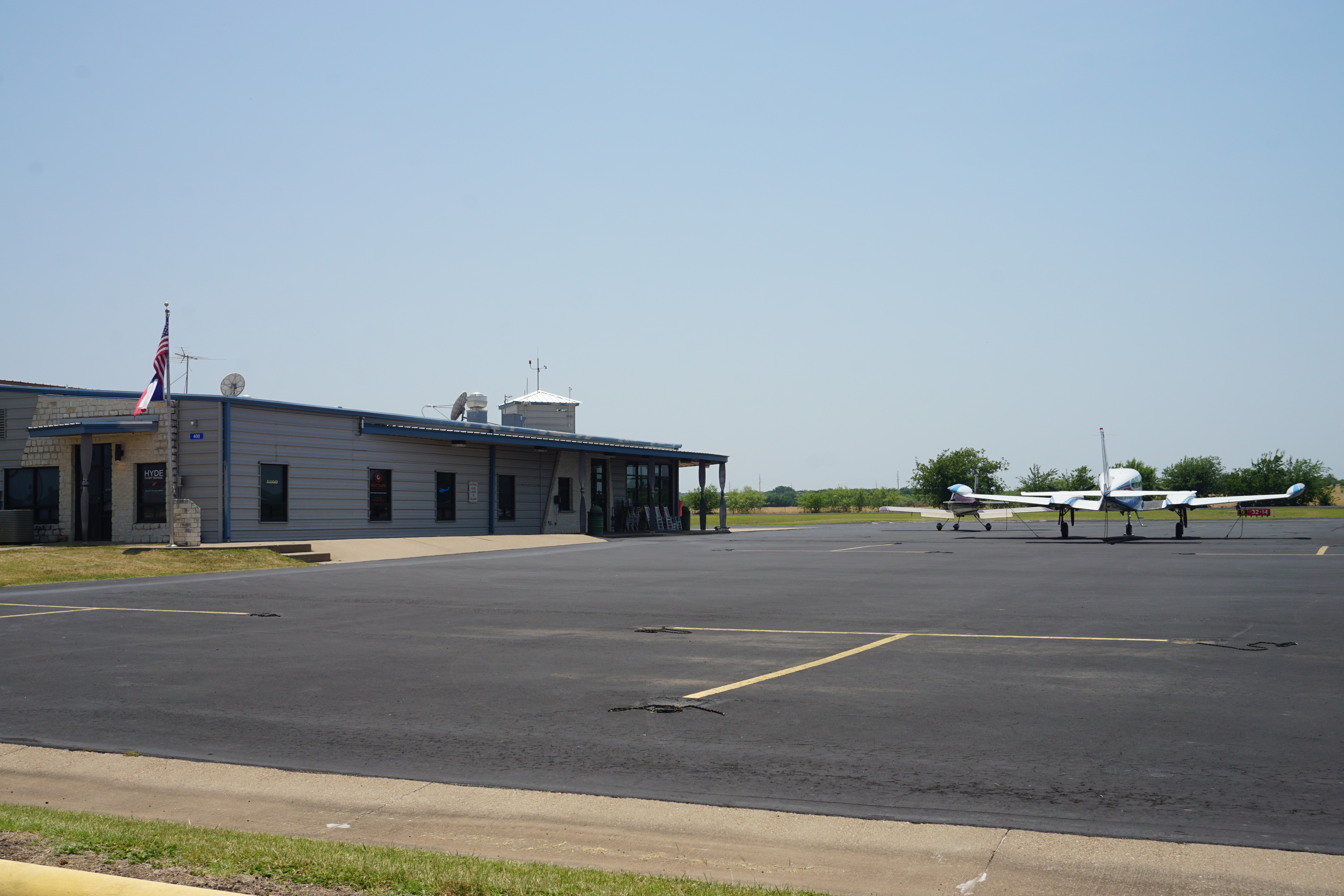
- IATA: none; ICAO: KGDJ; FAA LID: GDJ

Summary
- Airport type: Public
- Owner: City of Granbury
- Serves: Granbury, Texas
- Elevation AMSL: 778 ft (237 m)
- Coordinates: 32°26′40″N 097°49′01″W

Map
- Location of airport in Texas GDJ (the United States)

Runways
Direction	Length		Surface
Direction	ft	m	Surface
14/32	5,201	1,585	Asphalt

Statistics (2009)
- Aircraft operations: 26,700
- Based aircraft: 59
- Source: Federal Aviation Administration

Granbury Regional Airport (ICAO: KGDJ, FAA LID: GDJ, formerly F55) is a city-owned, public-use airport located two nautical miles (4 km) west of the central business district of Granbury, a city in Hood County, Texas, United States. Formerly known as Granbury Municipal Airport, it is included in the National Plan of Integrated Airport Systems for 2011–2015, which categorized it as a general aviation facility.

Although most U.S. airports use the same three-letter location identifier for the FAA and IATA, this airport is assigned GDJ by the FAA but has no designation from the IATA (which assigned GDJ to Gandajika Airport in Gandajika, DR Congo).

== Facilities and aircraft ==
Granbury Regional Airport covers an area of 76 acres (31 ha) at an elevation of 778 feet (237 m) above mean sea level. It has one runway designated 14/32 with an asphalt surface measuring 3,603 by 60 feet (1,098 x 18 m).

For the 12-month period ending February 5, 2009, the airport had 26,700 general aviation aircraft operations, an average of 73 per day. At that time there were 59 aircraft based at this airport: 86% single-engine, 10% multi-engine, 2% jet, and 2% helicopter.

== See also ==
- List of airports in Texas
