= GUX =

GUX, gux, or GuX may refer to:

- Rasmus "GuX" Ståhl, professional eSports player for SK Gaming
- gux, ISO 639-3 code for the Gurmantche language
- GUX, IATA airport code for Guna Airport, India
- GUX, division code for Gu County, Shanxi, China
- GUX, station code for Gurhi, a railway station in India
