= Bakwa Tshileo =

Bakwa-Tshileu
- Town
- Location in Democratic Republic of the Congo
- Coordinates: 6.582°S 23.834°E
- Country: DR Congo
- Province: Lomami
- Territory: Gandajika

Languages
  - Official: French
  - National: Tshiluba
- Time zone: UTC+02:00 (Central Africa Time)

Bakwa-Tshileu or Bakwa-Tshileo is a village in the Democratic Republic of the Congo. It is one of the ten villages that make up collectivity of Bakwa-Mulumba that is located in the territory of Gandajika and in the province of Lomami.

== Education ==
Educational structure in Bakwa-Tshileu is primary school and secondary school. Primary school lasts six years from first to sixth grade and secondary school lasts five years from 7th grade to 12th grade.
