= Gly (disambiguation) =

Gly is the amino acid glycine.

Gly or GLY may also refer to:

- "Gly" for a gigalight-year (1,000,000,000 light years), a billion light years
- Glynde railway station, a railway station in Sussex, England
- Goldsworthy Airport (IATA code: GLY), Goldsworthy, Western Australia, Australia
- ISO 639:gly, Gule language
