= GTWR =

GTWR may refer to:

- Grand Trunk Western Railroad, a defunct railway
- Gross trailer weight rating, of road vehicle trailers
- Geographical and Temporal Weighted Regression, a type of regression analysis

== See also ==
- GTW (disambiguation)
