= Meaípe =

Town in Espírito Santo, Brazil

Coordinates: 20°44′S 40°33′W

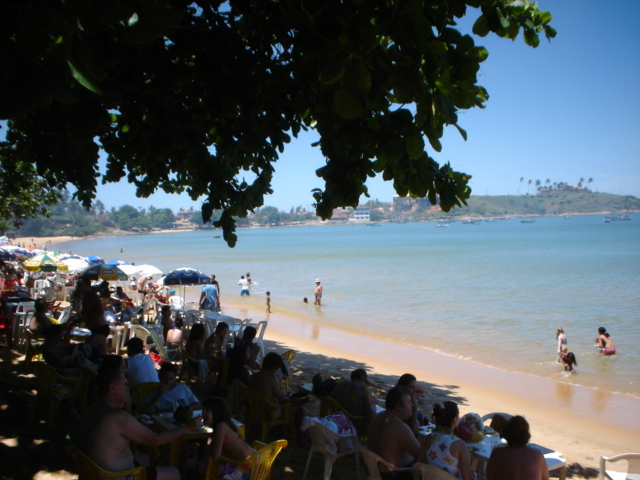
Meaípe's beach

Meaípe is a town located south of Guarapari in the state of Espírito Santo. Similarly to Guarapari, Meaípe's sand is slightly radioactive.

In recent years, storms have broken down sidewalks lining the beach, causing widespread damage to the town's coastline.
