= GTW =

GTW may refer to:

== Transportation ==
- Holešov Airport, in Zlín Region, Czech Republic

=== Rail transport ===
- Grand Trunk Western Railroad, an American railway
- Stadler GTW, an articulated railcar
- Gatwick Airport railway station, a railway station in Sussex, England

=== Road transport ===
- Gross trailer weight rating
- Gross train weight

== Other uses ==
- GTW (TV station), in Western Australia
- Gateway, Inc., an American computer maker
- Geosciences Technology Workshop
- Global Trade Watch, an American consumer advocacy organization
