= Paulo César Vinha State Park =

State park in Espírito Santo, Brazil

- Parque Estadual Paulo César Vinha
- IUCN category II (national park)
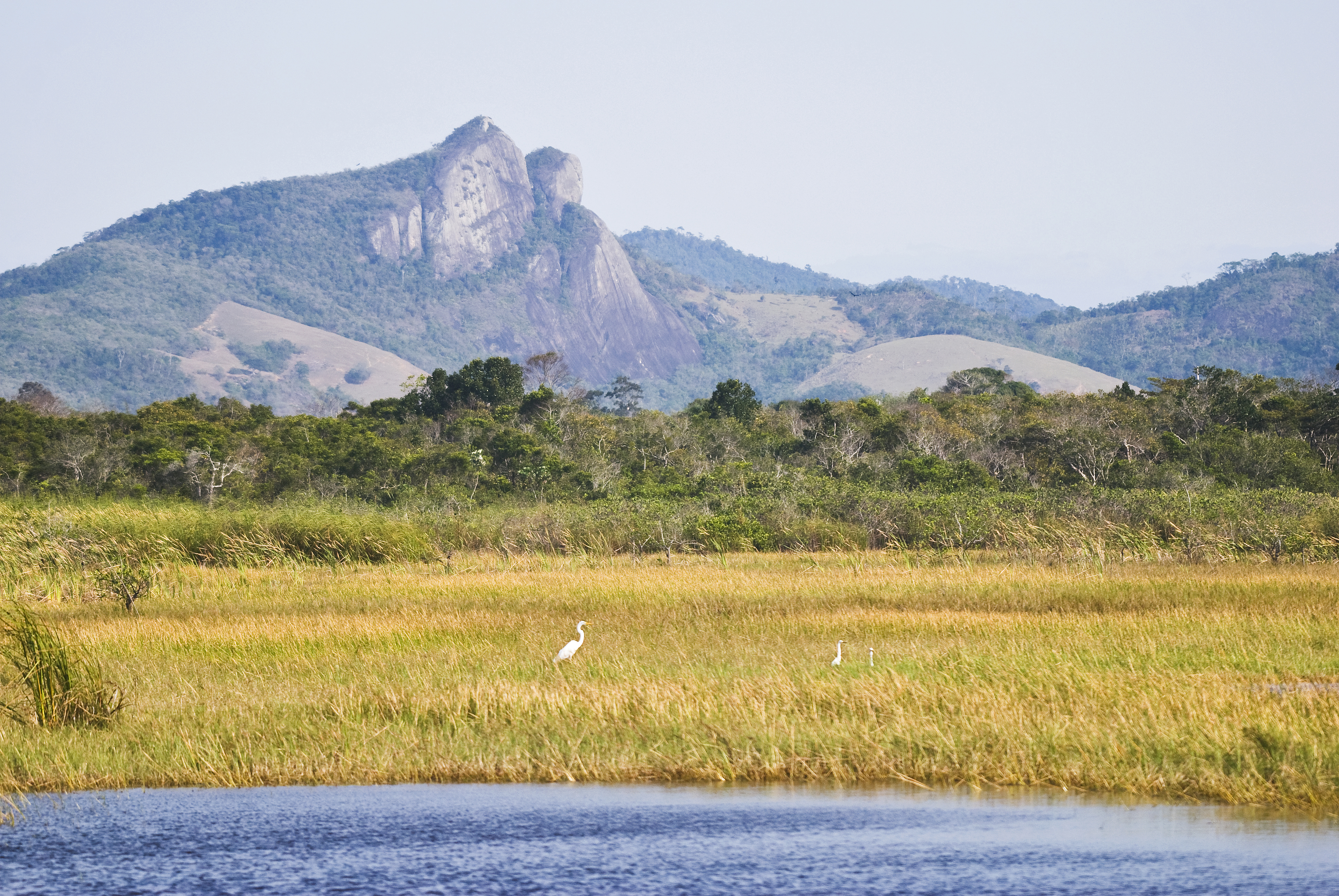
- Golden grass in the park

- Location within Brazil
- Nearest city: Guarapari, Espírito Santo
- Coordinates: 20°35′15″S 40°24′38″W
- Area: 1,500 hectares (3,700 acres)
- Designation: State park
- Created: 1990
- Administrator: IEMA: Instituto Estadual de Meio Ambiente e Recursos Hídricos

The Paulo César Vinha State Park (Portuguese: Parque Estadual Paulo César Vinha) is a state park in the state of Espírito Santo, Brazil. It protects an area of dunes, lagoons and marshes along the Atlantic shore.

== Location ==
The Paulo César Vinha State Park is in the municipality of Guarapari, Espírito Santo. It has an area of about 1,500 hectares (3,700 acres). There is a visitor center where videos and slides of the park are shown and lectures given on environmental education. The park has 4 kilometres (2.5 mi) of trails, starting about 1 kilometre (0.62 mi) from a parking lot outside the park. The park is surrounded by the Setiba Environmental Protection Area, which acts as a buffer zone and also tries to protect the marine environment of the Três Ilhas Archipelago.

The park has two beaches, the Sol and the Caraís. There are several islands and rocks offshore. The park contains diverse environments including lagoons, sand dunes and floodplains. The Caraís Lagoon is its main attraction. The lagoon has reddish water from the plant roots. Vegetation includes dry forest, permanently flooded forest, herbaceous marsh and open formations. Threatened species include the pimenteira rosa and ouriço preto.

== History ==
The park was created by state decree 2993-N of 1990, with the original name of Setiba State Park. The purpose is to protect a continuous stretch of restinga, one of the most threatened of the Atlantic Forest ecosystems. By law 4.903 of 1994 it was renamed Paulo César Vinha State Park in honor of the biologist Paulo César Vinha, who was killed in 1993 for opposing sand mining in the region. It became part of the Central Atlantic Forest Ecological Corridor, created in 2002.

== Sources ==
- Lamas, Ivana Reis; Crepaldi, Maria Otávia; Mesquita, Carlos Alberto Bernardo (2015), Uma Rede no Corredor (PDF) (in Portuguese), Conservação Internacional (CI-Brasil), ISBN 978-85-98830-28-5
- "Parque Estadual Paulo César Vinha", Férias Brasil (in Portuguese)
- "Parque Estadual Paulo César Vinha - Guarapari - ES", Guarapari Virtual (in Portuguese)
- Parque Estadual Paulo César Vinha (in Portuguese), IEMA: Instituto Estadual de Meio Ambiente e Recursos Hídricos, archived from the original on 2016-10-26
