= Glenormiston Airport =

Airport in Queensland, Australia

- IATA: GLM; ICAO: YGLO

Summary
- Airport type: Public
- Location: Glenormiston Station, Queensland, Australia
- Elevation AMSL: 519 ft (158 m)
- Coordinates: 22°53′21″S 138°49′18″E

Map
- Location within Queensland Location within Australia

Runways
| Direction | Length | | Surface |
| Direction | ft | m | Surface |
|---|---|---|---|
| 1 | | 1,998 | Dirt |

Glenormiston Airport is located near Glenormiston Station, Queensland, Australia.

== See also ==
- List of airports in Queensland
