= Guarapari =

Municipality in Southeastern Brazil

- Municipality
- Municipality of Guarapari
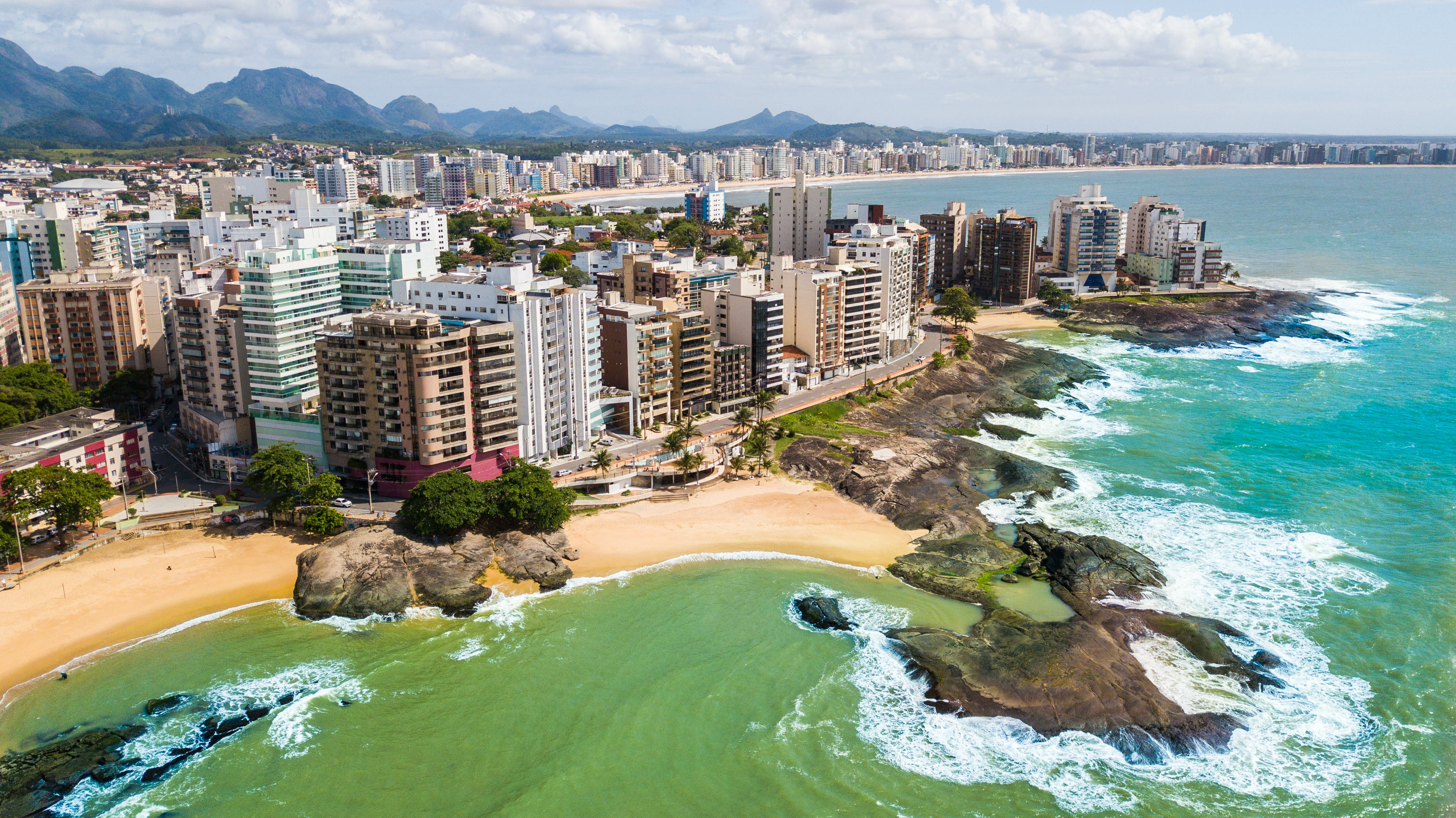
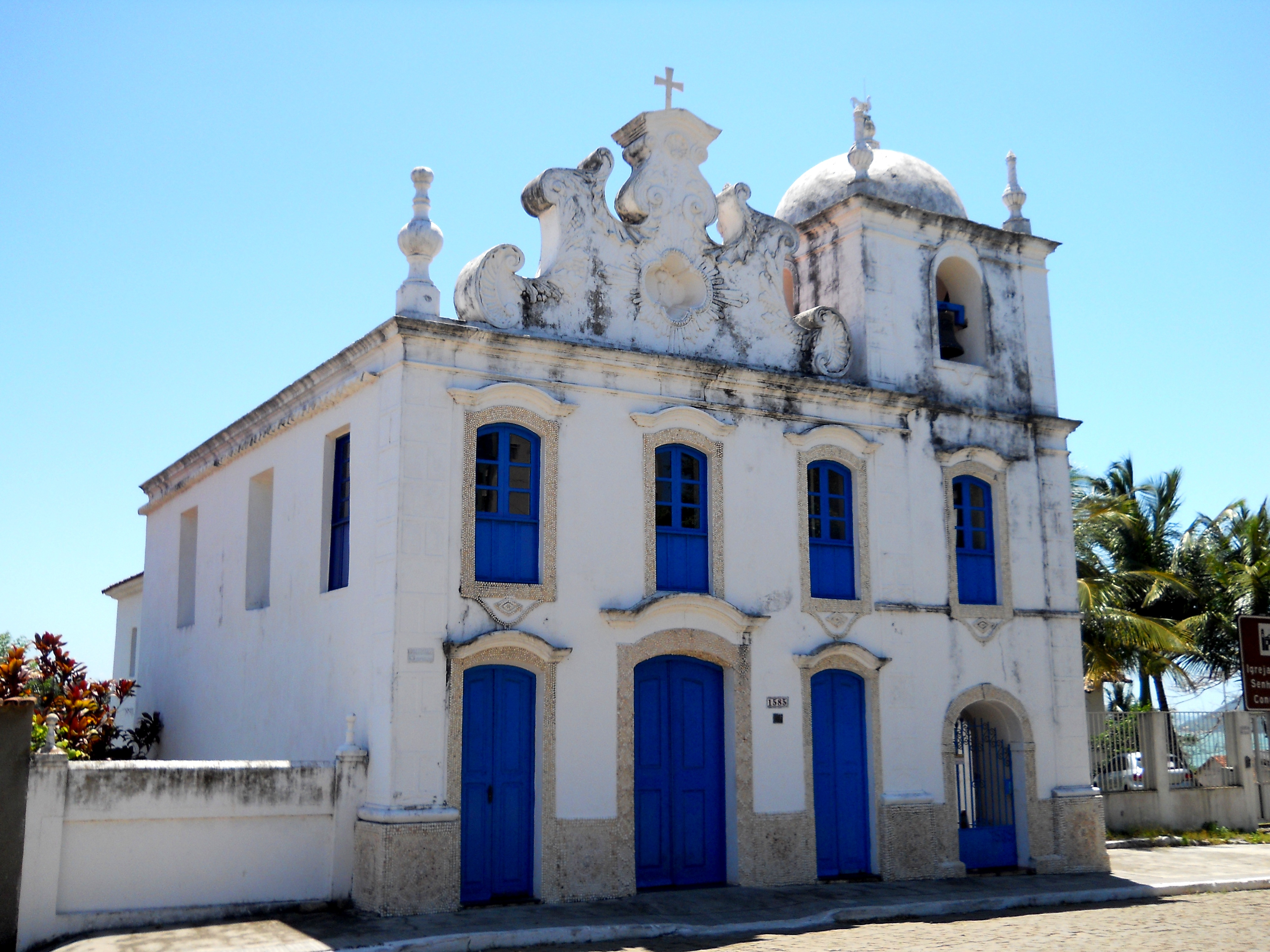
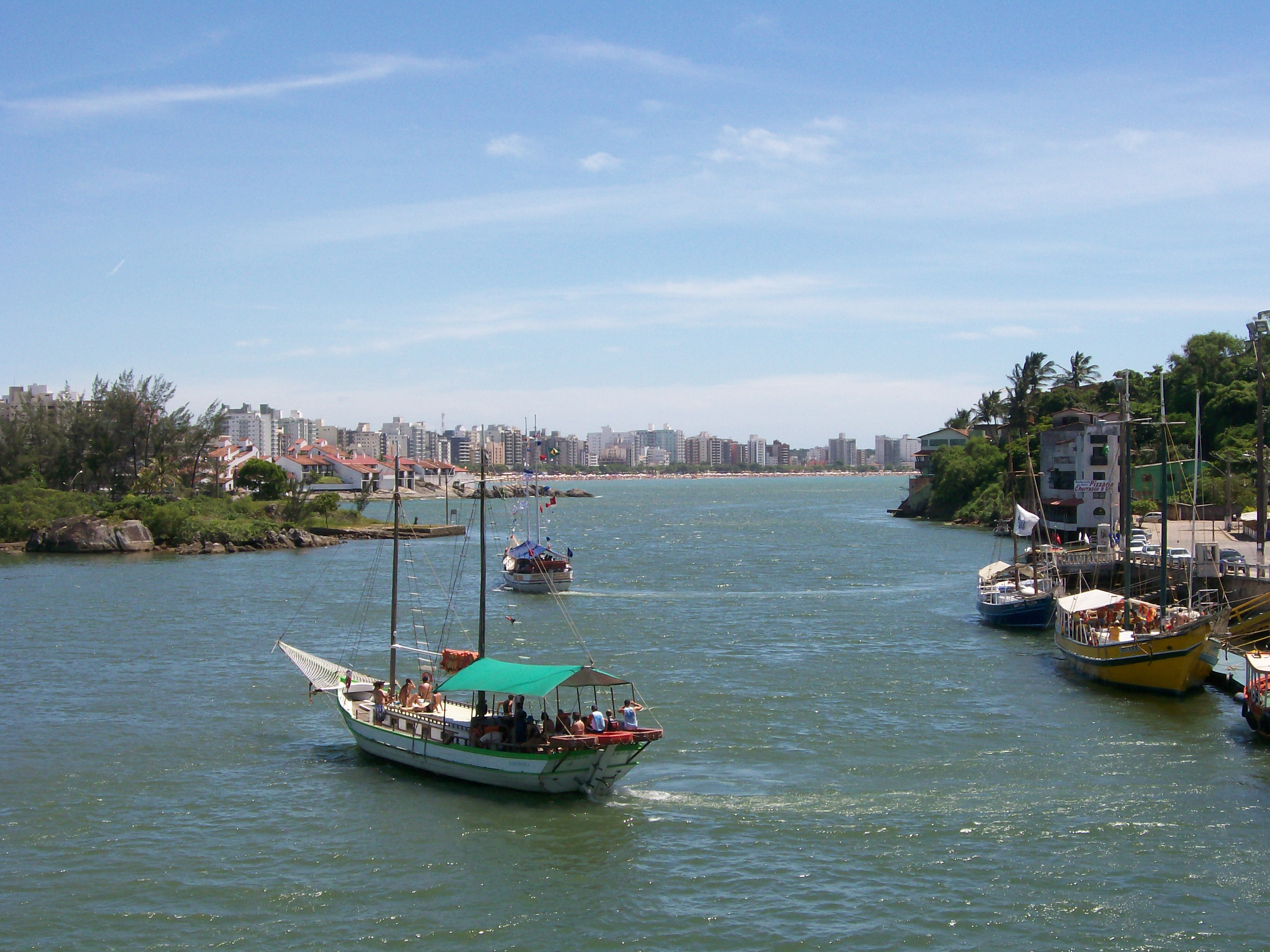
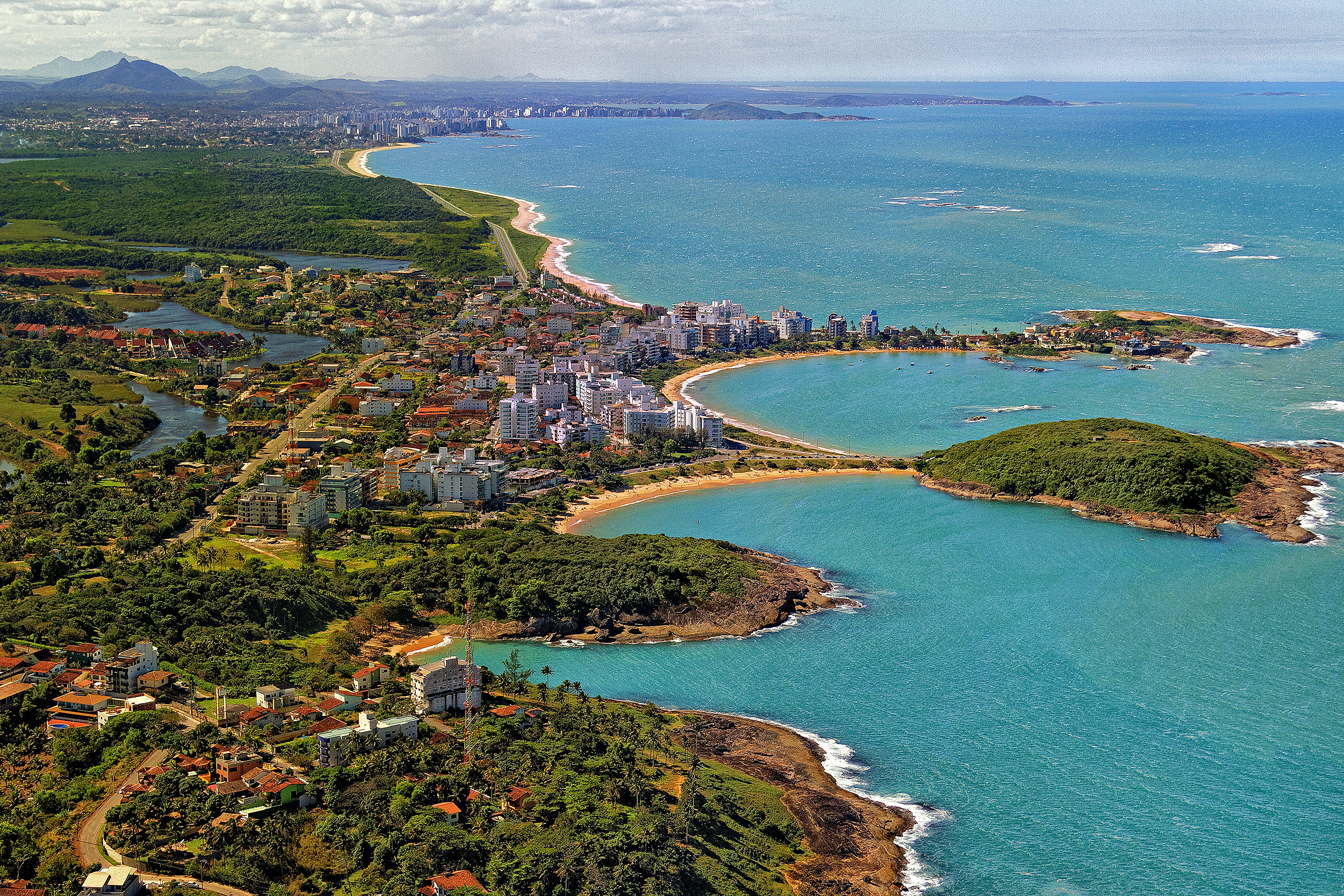
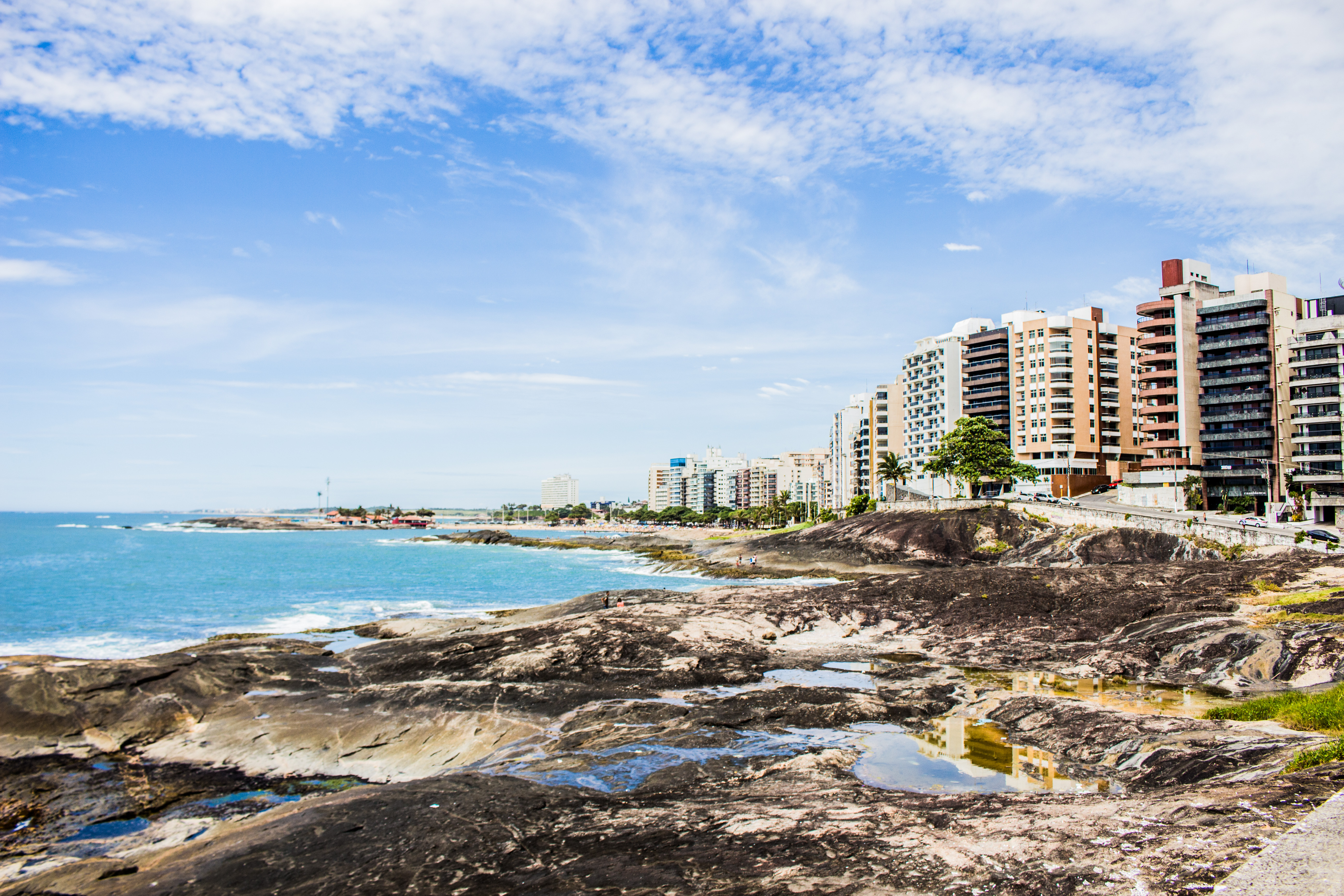

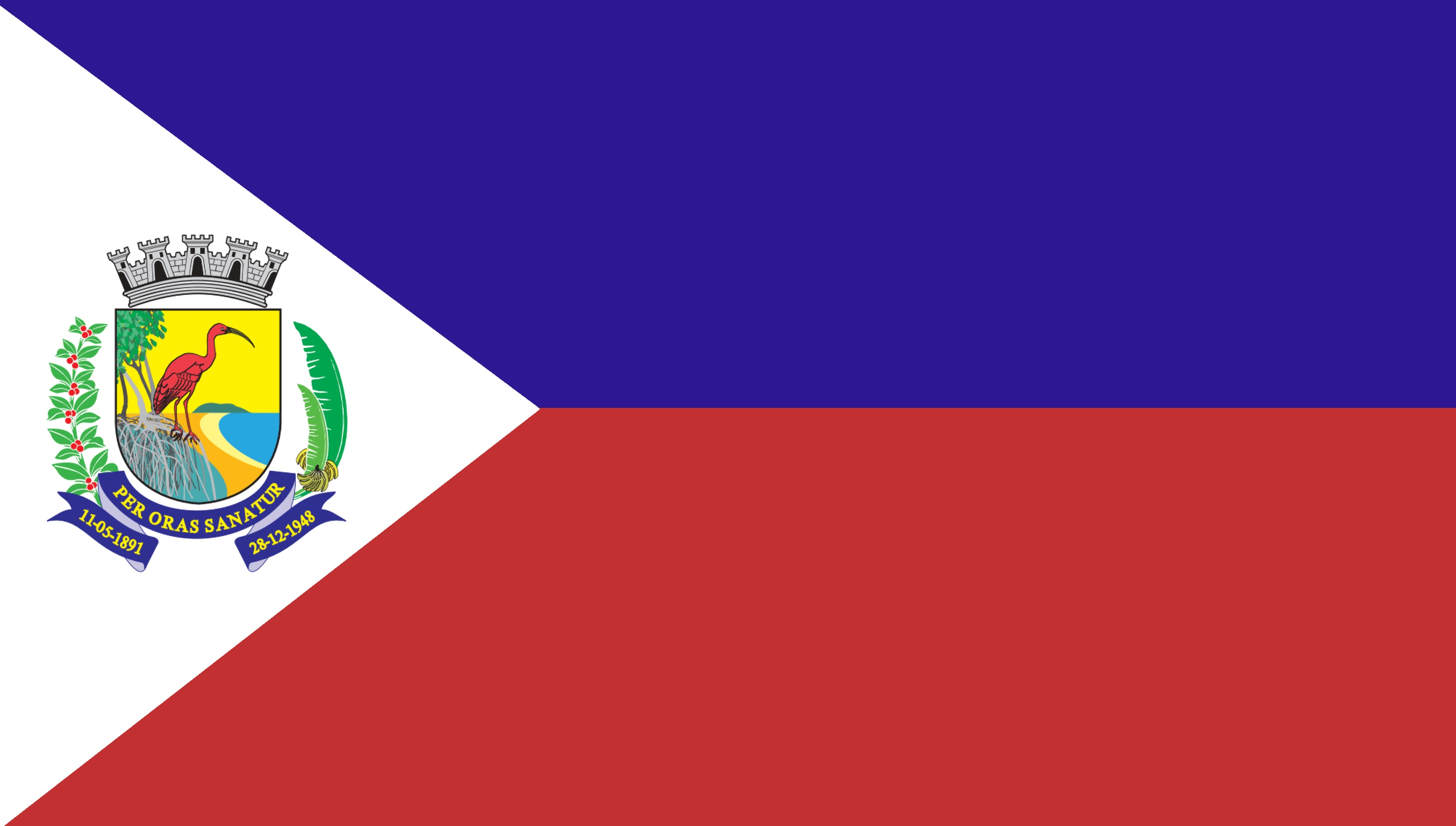
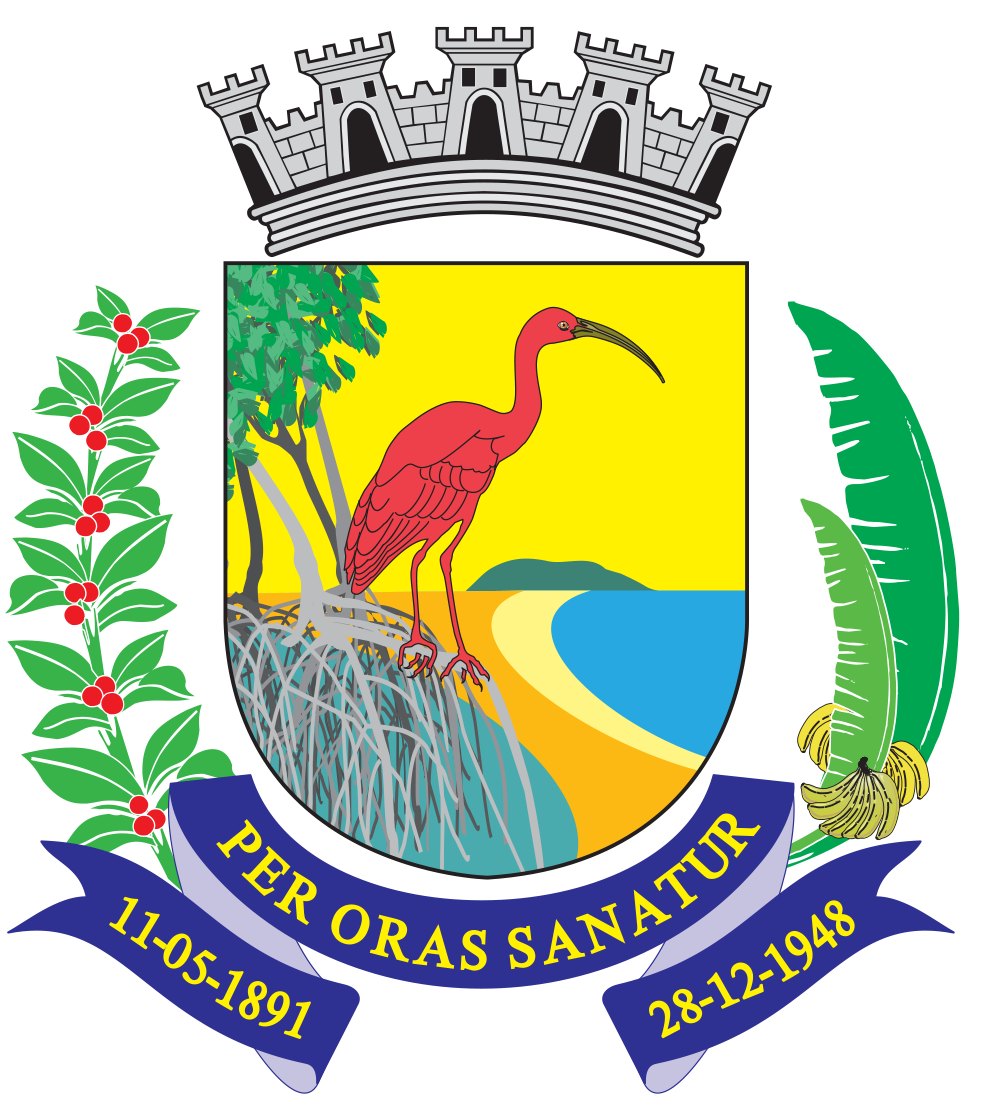
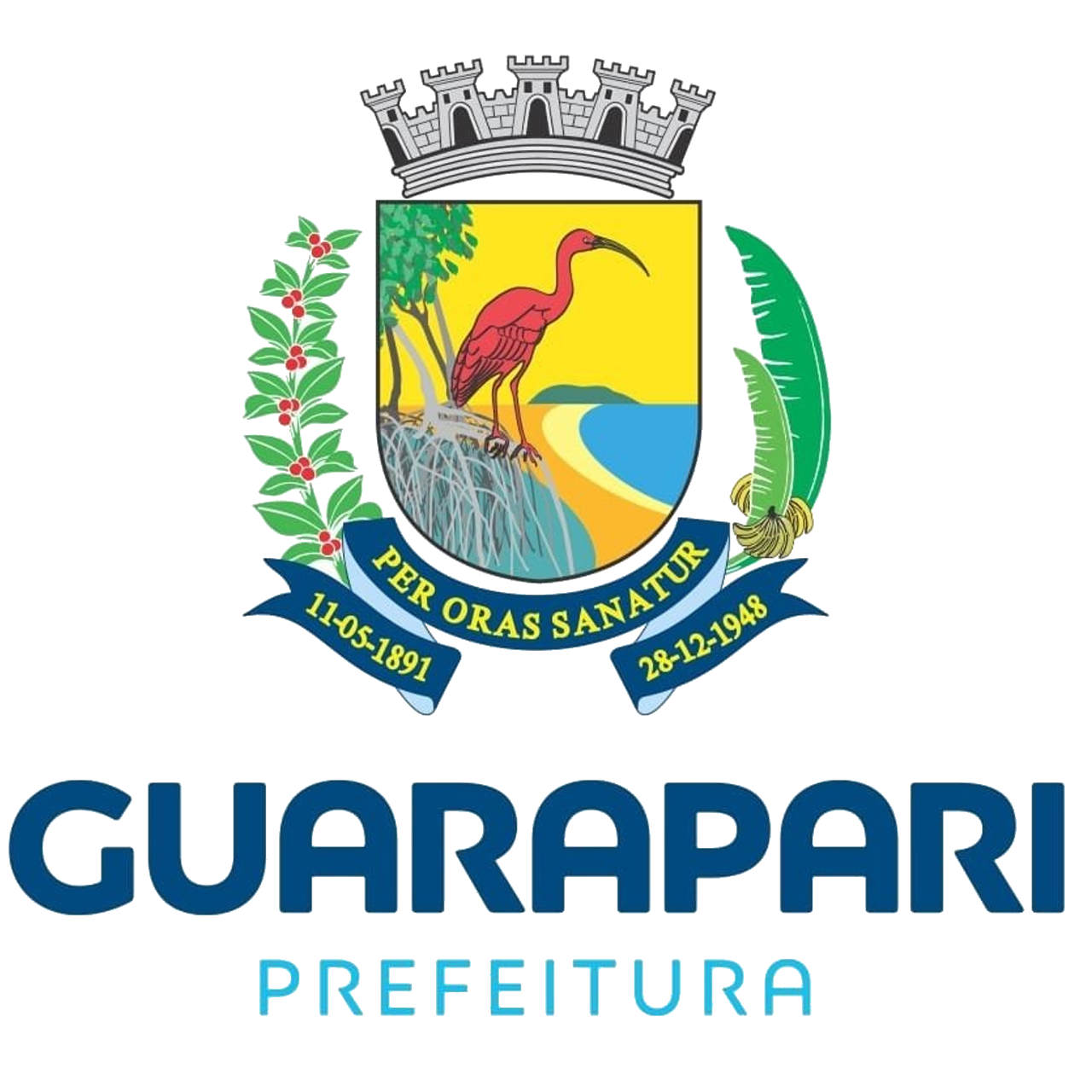
- Flag Coat of arms Logo
- Nickname: "Barra"
- Location in Espírito Santo
- Interactive map of Guarapari
- Coordinates: 20°39′S 40°30′W
- Country: Brazil
- Region: Southeast
- State: Espírito Santo
- Founded: 1679

Government
  - Mayor: Rodrigo Borges (Republicanos)

Area
  - Total: 591.815 km^{2} (228.501 sq mi)
- Elevation: 15 m (49 ft)

Population (2022 Census)
  - Total: 124,656
  - Estimate (2025): 136,311
  - Density: 210.633/km^{2} (545.538/sq mi)
- Demonym: Guarapariense
- Time zone: UTC−3 (BRT)
- HDI (2010): 0.731 – high

Guarapari is a coastal town of Espírito Santo, Brazil, a popular tourist destination. Its beach is famous for the high natural radioactivity level of its sand.

== Geography ==
=== Location ===
Guarapari is a part of Greater Vitoria, 47 km south of the state capital Vitória. Its population is 126,701 (2020) and its area is 592 km^{2}. It is a well-known tourist destination, known for its curving white sand beaches backed by commercial development, which extend southward to Nova Guarapari and Meaípe. With its heavily built-up coastline like Vila Velha and Vitória, it caters heavily to seasonal tourists, and consequently has quite a dramatic seasonal population fluctuation.

The municipality contains the 953-hectare (2,350-acre) Concha d'Ostra Sustainable Development Reserve, established in 2003 to protect the mangroves of the Bay of Guarapari. It also contains the 1,500-hectare (3,700-acre) Paulo César Vinha State Park, which protects an area of dunes, lagoons and marshes along the Atlantic shore. Formerly called the Setiba nature reserve, it is a pristine example of a coastal ecosystem and important for local turtle and bird populations.

== History ==
Around the year 1000, the Indigenous people who occupied the southern coast of what is now the state of Espírito Santo were driven inland by the invasion of Tupi peoples from the Amazon. In the 16th century, when the first European explorers arrived in the region, it was inhabited by one of these Tupi peoples: the Temiminós.

In 1585, the Jesuit priest José de Anchieta founded a Jesuit mission to catechize the Indigenous people of the region: the village of Rio Verde, or the village of Santa Maria de Guaraparim. The village had a convent and a church dedicated to Saint Anne. For its inauguration, Anchieta composed the Auto Tupi. In 1677, the church of Our Lady of the Conception was built. In 1679, the village of Guaraparim was elevated to the status of a town. In 1835, the district of Guarapari was created. In 1860, the district received a visit from the Brazilian Emperor Dom Pedro II. In 1878, it became a municipality. In 1891, it acquired city status.

At the end of the 19th century, European settlers (mostly Italians who landed on the Benevente River) settled in the municipality's interior, founding the towns of Todos os Santos and Rio Calçado, among others. These families' main economic activity was coffee, in addition to the cultivation they cultivated for their own subsistence. In 1948, its own town hall was established. In the mid-1960s and 1970s, Guarapari became nationally famous due to the purported medicinal properties of its monazite sands. As a result, there was a growing tourist wave around the city.

== Transportation ==
The city is served by Guarapari Airport.

== Radioactivity ==
Along a roughly 500-mile (800 km) portion of Brazil's Atlantic coast that runs from north of Rio de Janeiro up to the region south of Bahia, the sands of old beaches are naturally radioactive. Sea waves pound coastal mountains rich in monazite, a phosphate of rare earth metals containing uranium and thorium. The background radiation level on some spots on the Guarapari beach read 175 mSv per year (20μSv/h); Some other spots can reach dosages of up to 55 μSv/h. The average exposure level across the United States is 0.34 μSv/h while a chest x-ray is a one time exposure of 0.1 mSv, and an abdominal and pelvic CT scan with and without contrast is 20–30 mSv.

In the Guarapari city, radiation levels are far lower: a study among 320 inhabitants showed an average received dose of 0.6 μSv/h, corresponding to 5.2 mSv per year.
