= Guarapari Airport =

Guarapari Airport Aeroporto de Guarapari
- IATA: GUZ; ICAO: SNGA; LID: ES0007

Summary
- Airport type: Public
- Serves: Guarapari
- Time zone: BRT (UTC−03:00)
- Elevation AMSL: 9 m (30 ft)
- Coordinates: 20°38′47″S 040°29′30″W

Map
- Location in Brazil

Runways
Direction	Length		Surface
Direction	m	ft	Surface
06/24	1,088	3,570	Asphalt
- Sources: ANAC, DECEA

Guarapari Airport (IATA: GUZ, ICAO: SNGA) is the airport serving Guarapari, Brazil.

== Access ==
The airport is located 4 km (2 mi) from downtown Guarapari.

== See also ==
- List of airports in Brazil
