= Holešov Airport =

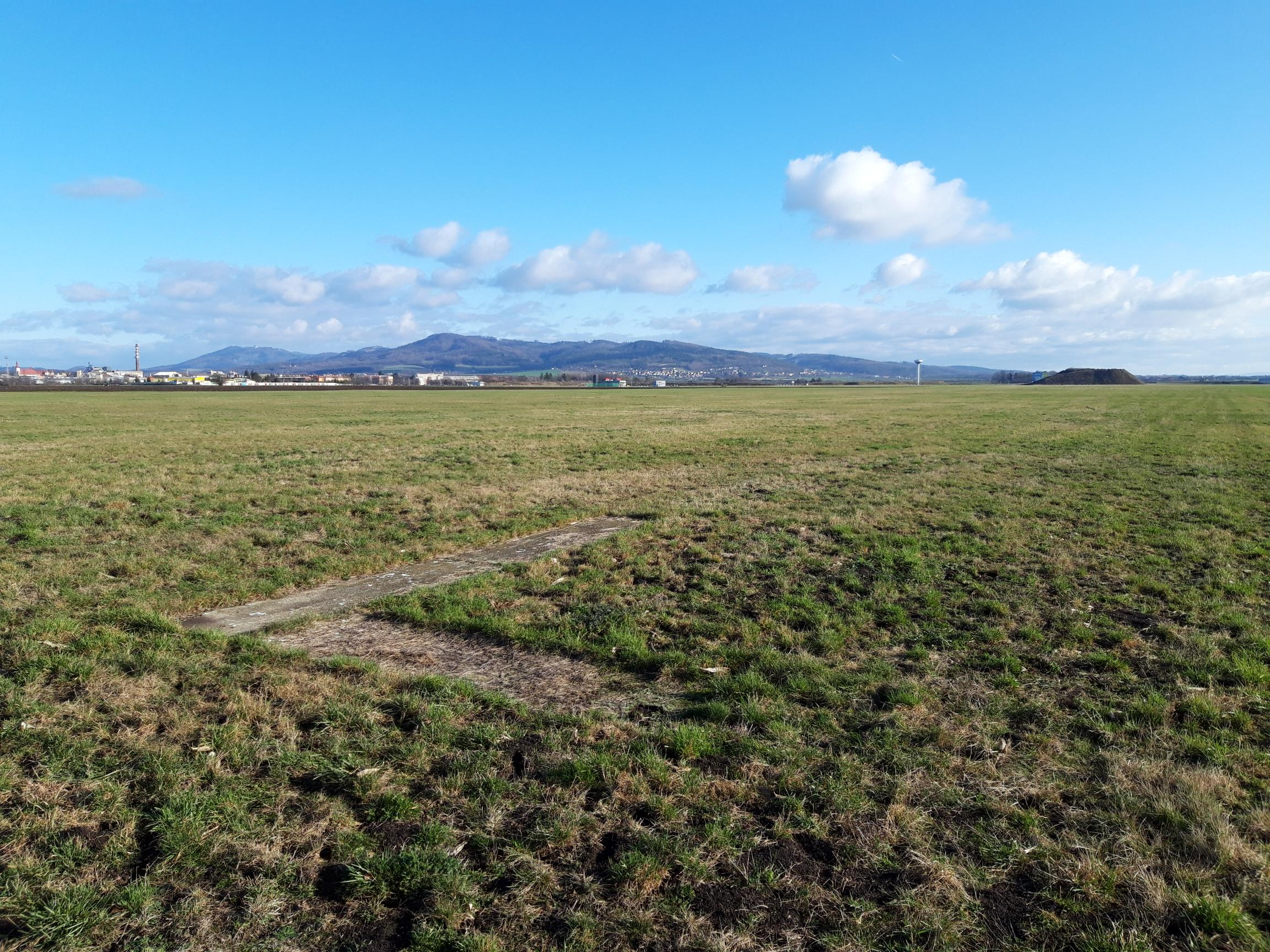
- IATA: GTW; ICAO: LKHO

Summary
- Serves: Holešov
- Coordinates: 49°19′N 17°34′E
- Interactive map of Holešov Airport

Runways
Direction	Length		Surface
Direction	ft	m	Surface
	3,937	1,200
	5,905	1,800

Holešov Airport (Czech: Letiště Holešov) was an airport serving the city of Holešov located in the Kroměříž District in the Zlín Region of the Czech Republic. The airport was opened in February 1953, and began scheduled commercial flights by April of that year. By the late 1970s, passenger numbers were dwindling due to the opening of a nearby motorway, and was closed on 31 March 2009 following years of limited activity.

== History ==
On 3 August, 1930, an aviation day was held at Holešov, which led to the plans of a sports airport led by Holešov Aeroclub. The plans were later changed for a civilian airport, and would be designed and built by national enterprise Svit Gottwaldov-Zlín. In 1949, a proposal was made to cancel the construction of the airport, After a change of investor, construction continued, but with a limited budget. This led to a reduction in the scope of construction. By 1950, modification of the airfield area began, and a hangar was approved for use in 1952. In September 1952, the first military aircraft landed in Holešov, and the airfield was officially approved in February 1953. On 1 April, 1953, Czechoslovak Airlines (ČSA) began scheduled operations from the airport, utilizing aircraft such as the Douglas DC-3 and Ilyushin Il-14. In 1956, a fire station was built, providing emergency services to the airport. In late 1959, a control tower was built, and the airport became home to Automobile Repair Workshops - ČSAO. The airline flew flights between eastern Moravia and Prague, with each journey taking from 45 to 60 minutes. Further upgrades of the airport took place during the 1960s.

By the 1970s, operations were jointly handled by and Slov-Air and ČSA. In 1977, the completion and expansion of the airport was approved, and was to be gradually carried out in the following years. By the late 1970s, passenger traffic began decreasing following the first sections of the Prague-Brno motorway being opened, providing a new travel alternative. Stringent safety and security measures were also rolled out by the 1980s, making check-in a considerably longer process, and an energy crisis occurring at the time increased the costs for refueling aircraft. In autumn 1980, the regular ČSA air route was cancelled, and the airport was transferred to Slovair Bratislava. Beginning in the 1980s, several projects were launched to restore the importance of Holešov Airport, all of which were unsuccessful. There were also further complications in the 1990s.

=== Closure ===
In 2005, the airport was purchased by the government of Zlín Region for the purposes of developing it into a new industrial zone, and began working on the project by 2006. On 31 March, 2009, Holešov Airport was officially closed by the Civil Aviation Authority at the request of Industry Servus ZK, following years of reduced activity. Subsequently, the departure lounge and two hangars were demolished, with those who were using the airport being financially compensated by Zlin Region authorities. The Holešov Industrial Zone was established, aimed at providing new jobs to the region's decreasing employment rate.

On 6 April, 2023, Jan Dúbravčík held a presentation of the history of the airport to the general public, organized Municipal Library of Holešov in cooperation with the Holešov Museum and the Holešov Local History Circle. The event was held in the study room of the Holešov Library, showing that the topic of the former airport was still relevant in interest of the general public.
