= Gandajika Airport =

- IATA: GDJ; ICAO: FZWC

Summary
- Serves: Gandajika, DR Congo
- Elevation AMSL: 2,618 ft / 798 m
- Coordinates: 6.7816°S 23.9617°E

Map
- Location in the Democratic Republic of the Congo

Runways
Direction	Length		Surface
Direction	m	ft	Surface
	1,100	3,610

Gandajika Airport (IATA: GDJ, ICAO: FZWC) was an airport serving Gandajika, a territory in the Kabinda district of the Kasaï-Oriental province, in the Democratic Republic of the Congo. The airport has been abandoned and is not visible on satellite imagery anymore.

== Facilities ==
The airport resided at an elevation of 2,618 feet (798 m) above mean sea level and had a runway which is 1,100 metres (3,610 ft) in length.
