= Gandajika =

- Commune
- Location in Democratic Republic of the Congo
- Coordinates: 6°45′S 23°58′E
- Country: DR Congo
- Province: Lomami
- Territory: Gandajika
- Elevation: 806 m (2,644 ft)

Population (2012)
  - Total: 146,217
- Time zone: UTC+2 (Central Africa Time)

Gandajika or Ngandajika is a town in Lomami province of the Democratic Republic of the Congo. It is the administrative center of the territory of the same name.

== Climate ==
Climate data for Gandajika, elevation 780 m (2,560 ft), (1971–2000)
| Month | Jan | Feb | Mar | Apr | May | Jun | Jul | Aug | Sep | Oct | Nov | Dec | Year |
|---|---|---|---|---|---|---|---|---|---|---|---|---|---|
| Mean daily maximum °C (°F) | 29.2 (84.6) | 29.6 (85.3) | 30.0 (86.0) | 30.5 (86.9) | 31.4 (88.5) | 31.5 (88.7) | 31.5 (88.7) | 31.3 (88.3) | 30.8 (87.4) | 30.1 (86.2) | 29.5 (85.1) | 29.1 (84.4) | 30.4 (86.7) |
| Mean daily minimum °C (°F) | 18.7 (65.7) | 18.8 (65.8) | 19.0 (66.2) | 18.8 (65.8) | 17.9 (64.2) | 16.2 (61.2) | 15.8 (60.4) | 17.2 (63.0) | 18.1 (64.6) | 18.2 (64.8) | 18.5 (65.3) | 18.8 (65.8) | 18.0 (64.4) |
| Average precipitation mm (inches) | 159.0 (6.26) | 140.0 (5.51) | 193.0 (7.60) | 162.0 (6.38) | 50.0 (1.97) | 8.0 (0.31) | 7.0 (0.28) | 37.0 (1.46) | 102.0 (4.02) | 137.0 (5.39) | 213.0 (8.39) | 217.0 (8.54) | 1,425 (56.11) |
| Average relative humidity (%) | 82 | 81 | 80 | 79 | 67 | 55 | 54 | 62 | 72 | 77 | 81 | 82 | 73 |
Source: FAO
