= Lord Howe Island Airport =

Airport in Australia

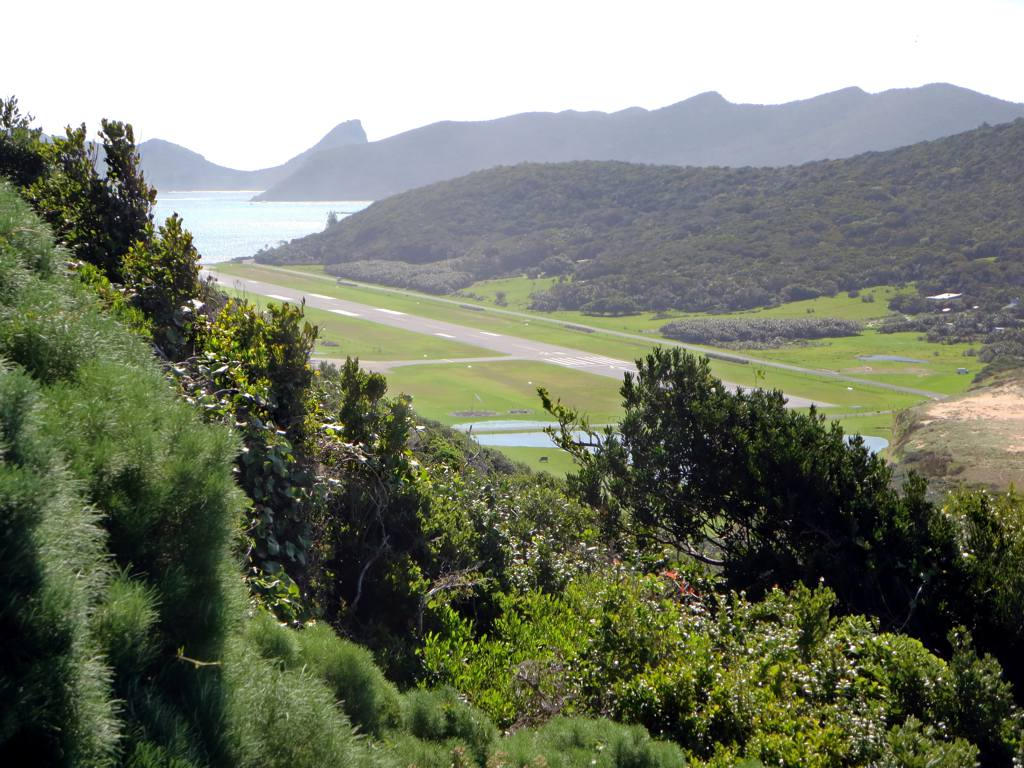
- Runway in 2016
- IATA: LDH; ICAO: YLHI

Summary
- Airport type: Public
- Owner: Lord Howe Island Board
- Operator: Lord Howe Island Board
- Serves: Lord Howe Island Australia
- Opened: September 1974
- Elevation AMSL: 17 ft (5.2 m)
- Coordinates: 31°32′18″S 159°04′38″E

Maps
- Location on map of Oceania
- Interactive map of Lord Howe Island Airport

Runways
Direction	Length		Surface
Direction	m	ft	Surface
10/28	888	2,913	Asphalt
- Sources: AIP and aerodrome chart

Lord Howe Island Airport (IATA: LDH, ICAO: YLHI) is an airport providing air transportation to Lord Howe Island. It is owned and operated by the Lord Howe Island Board. Prior to its opening in September 1974, Lord Howe Island was served by flying boats from Rose Bay Water Airport. The runway was built by the Australian Army Corps of Engineers to replace the flying-boat service.

The airport's short runway limits the aircraft that can provide scheduled passenger services. QantasLink ended its own flights to the island in May 2025 as it retired its Dash 8 Q200 fleet; Skytrans Australia took over the Sydney service, retaining a Qantas codeshare agreement. Eastern Air Services also operates services from mainland airports.

== History ==
=== Early aviation and wartime operations ===
In 1931, Francis Chichester visited Lord Howe Island in a Gipsy Moth floatplane during his flight across the Tasman Sea via Norfolk Island. A storm overturned the aircraft in the lagoon, and repairs delayed his departure for nine weeks.

During the Second World War, Royal Australian Air Force (RAAF) Catalina flying boats visited the island in support of its meteorological station and radio base. The wartime communications facilities included a continuous wireless watch maintained by RAAF personnel. Catalina medical evacuation flights from the island began in May 1942.

On 28 September 1948, RAAF Catalina A24-381 crashed into Malabar Hill while returning to the lagoon during a navigation exercise. Seven of the nine people aboard were killed.

=== Scheduled flying-boat services ===
Trans Oceanic Airways began commercial flying-boat services in 1947, followed later that year by Qantas. The services connected the island's lagoon with Rose Bay in Sydney, using Catalinas and, subsequently, Short Sandringham flying boats. Qantas competed with Trans Oceanic Airways on the route. In June 1949, a Qantas Catalina broke its moorings during a storm at Lord Howe Island and was washed ashore. Qantas withdrew its flying-boat service in 1951. Ansett took over the service in 1953 and continued operating flying boats until 1974.

The lagoon imposed operational constraints: flying boats needed high tide to land, and swell could enter over the reef. The service also depended on ageing aircraft and government subsidies, contributing to proposals for a land aerodrome.

=== Planning and construction ===
Proposals for an airstrip were discussed from the 1950s. A November 1955 report in the island's newspaper recorded the issue, and subsequent investigations considered several alignments, including one across Stevens Reserve near Neds Beach. A 1970 agreement envisaged a 4,000-foot (1,200 m) runway with Commonwealth and New South Wales funding, but rising cost estimates prevented the project proceeding. In August 1973, the state government agreed to a shorter, 3,000-foot (910 m) runway.

The larger proposals prompted concern about the lagoon, coral reef, scenery and the effects of increased tourism. In 1970, the Board commissioned an Australian Museum environmental survey to inform conservation and development planning. Writing in 1974, biologists H. F. Recher and S. S. Clark argued that the main threat to wildlife lay in uncontrolled development accompanying improved access, rather than the smaller airstrip itself, which occupied previously cleared agricultural land.

The impending withdrawal of flying boats made construction urgent. The NSW Government and the Australian Department of Transport engaged the Army as the construction agency. A detachment of approximately 60 engineers from the 1st Field Engineer Regiment, based at Holsworthy, was assigned to build a runway for light aircraft, with provision for emergency use by RAAF Caribou transports.

Construction began in March 1974. Three Navy landing craft delivered about 400 tonnes of equipment, and the Army workforce arrived by flying boat. The original grass-strip proposal was changed to a sealed runway during construction. The works crossed the swamp at Mosely Park; fill came from Kirribilli Hill, and basalt boulders from the Little Island area were used for a seawall. The project took about six months.

A RAAF Caribou made the first landing on the unfinished runway on 4 August 1974 to evacuate an injured islander. The first civil landing followed on 11 September. Scheduled Heron services began on 19 September, using an aircraft and crew chartered from Connair. The last scheduled flying-boat service had operated on 10 September.

=== Regional airlines ===
Airlines of New South Wales ended its Heron service in February 1975. Subsequent operators included Oxley Airlines, which served Port Macquarie and Newcastle, and North Coast Airlines, which linked the island with Coffs Harbour. The short runway initially favoured small commuter aircraft such as the Beechcraft King Air, Aero Commander and Piper Navajo, generally carrying about eight to twelve passengers. In December 1989, Norfolk Airlines introduced the Dash 8-100, increasing capacity to as many as 36 passengers.

Norfolk Airlines entered administration in March 1991. Eastern Australia Airlines, then an Australian Airlines subsidiary, began scheduled services on 1 June 1991. Sunstate Airlines added a Brisbane service in September 1992. The airlines subsequently operated under Qantas ownership and the QantasLink brand.

=== QantasLink withdrawal and Skytrans ===
QantasLink's decision to retire its Dash 8 Q200 fleet led to its withdrawal as the operator of the Sydney service. The Q200 was the only aircraft type in the Qantas fleet able to use the island's short runway. The three aircraft were sold to Skytrans as QantasLink moved towards a fleet of larger Q400s.

The last QantasLink-operated flight was on 16 May 2025. Skytrans took over using the former Qantas aircraft, with Qantas continuing to market flights under a codeshare agreement. Skytrans was awarded the regulated Sydney route licence until March 2030, with the transition arrangements running until February 2026. The airline briefly used the SmartLynx Australia name, introduced in July 2025, before returning to the Skytrans name in February 2026.

At community meetings in May 2025, residents raised concerns about resident fares, the availability of frequent-flyer seats and advance bookings during the change of operator. Airline representatives said that problems integrating Skytrans bookings with the Qantas website were being addressed. QantasLink representatives said the codeshare would preserve connections to other Qantas flights and continued promotion of the island.

== Light aircraft transit ==
Lord Howe Island (along with Norfolk Island) is an important transit and refuelling point for light aircraft flying between Australia and New Zealand. Located 600 km (373 mi) to the west is the Australian mainland, and 900 km (559 mi) to the east is Norfolk Island Airport which is within range of New Zealand to the southeast and New Caledonia to the north. These countries are within the range of many light aircraft when fitted with extra fuel tanks and operating via the two islands, but not while flying directly between them. From New Caledonia, other Pacific nations such as Vanuatu and Fiji are within range and can be used as further 'stepping stones' to other South Pacific and North Pacific destinations.

== Facilities ==
The airport's elevation above mean sea level is 17 ft (5 m) and it has one runway, measuring 888 m × 30 m (2,913 ft × 98 ft). The asphalt runway is designated 10/28. Portable runway lighting is provided for emergency use. The airport is owned and operated by the Lord Howe Island Board and handles passenger flights and limited air freight.

=== Runway extension proposals ===
A feasibility study prepared for the Board in 2019 examined extending the runway into the lagoon to accommodate larger aircraft, including the ATR 72 and Dash 8 Q400. It considered reclamation and a deck supported on piles, alongside environmental and approval constraints. The accompanying preliminary business case calculated a benefit–cost ratio of 0.39 for the extension at a 7 per cent discount rate and concluded that it was not economically viable under those assumptions. It recommended further investigation of retaining Q200 services through aircraft purchase or leasing, or introducing scheduled services with smaller aircraft from other mainland airports.

== Airlines and destinations ==
Airlines	Destinations
Eastern Air Services	Gold Coast, Newcastle, Port Macquarie
Skytrans Australia	Sydney

=== Airfares ===
In a May 2021 comparison of regular economy fares, Australian Frequent Flyer ranked Sydney–Lord Howe Island fourth among the Australian domestic point-to-point routes it compared by cost per kilometre, excluding short regional connecting sectors. It listed a lowest regular one-way Qantas fare of A$481, equivalent to 61 cents per kilometre. In its coverage of the 2025 change of operator, the publication described the route as costly to operate because of frequent weather diversions and the aircraft's 36-seat capacity.

== Statistics ==
In calendar year 2025, Lord Howe Island Airport recorded 30,623 revenue passenger movements and 1,350 aircraft movements on scheduled regular public transport (RPT) services. In the 2024–25 financial year, it recorded 29,734 passenger movements and 1,332 aircraft movements. These figures count arrivals and departures and exclude charter and other non-scheduled flights.

Annual passenger and aircraft statistics for Lord Howe Island Airport
Financial year	Revenue passenger movements	Aircraft movements
2015–16	34,426	1,407
2016–17	35,012	1,487
2017–18	34,351	1,463
2018–19	34,542	1,509
2019–20	24,920	1,131
2020–21	25,712	1,201
2021–22	23,453	1,129
2022–23	31,147	1,316
2023–24	29,201	1,299
2024–25	29,734	1,332
