= Bonza =

Low-cost airline of Australia (2021–2024)

IATA	ICAO	Call sign
AB	BNZ	BONZA
- Founded: October 2021
- Commenced operations: 31 January 2023
- Ceased operations: 29 April 2024
- Operating bases: Gold Coast; Melbourne; Sunshine Coast
- Fleet size: 4
- Destinations: 21
- Parent company: 777 Partners
- Headquarters: Sunshine Coast, Queensland, Australia
- Key people: Tim Jordan (Founder & CEO)
- Website: www.flybonza.com (archived)

Bonza Aviation Pty Ltd, operating as Bonza, was a short-lived Australian low-cost airline, headquartered on the Sunshine Coast. Founded in October 2021, Bonza commenced operations on 31 January 2023. The airline entered voluntary administration on 30 April 2024 suspending all services, after several aircraft were repossessed. It was placed in liquidation on 2 July 2024 after laying off its workforce and failing to find a buyer.

== History ==
=== Background ===
Bonza was founded in October 2021 by former Virgin Blue executive Tim Jordan. U.S. investment firm 777 Partners were the inaugural investors and backers.

The airline signalled its intention to disassociate from the main cities of Melbourne, Sydney and Brisbane, instead setting up its headquarters at Sunshine Coast Airport with the aim of growing the market by focusing on under-utilised and unserved routes between regional and domestic cities through a point-to-point network model, similar to that of Ryanair in Europe. As a low-cost carrier, Bonza launched without a frequent-flyer program or airport lounges and limited bookings solely to its FlyBonza app. To differentiate themselves from other airlines, Bonza launched as a one hundred percent domestic airline, appealing to the Australian culture by offering Aussie items and services such as airline branded swim briefs known as budgie smugglers, food typically found at a school tuckshop, and the staff being labelled as "Legends".

=== First base and launch ===
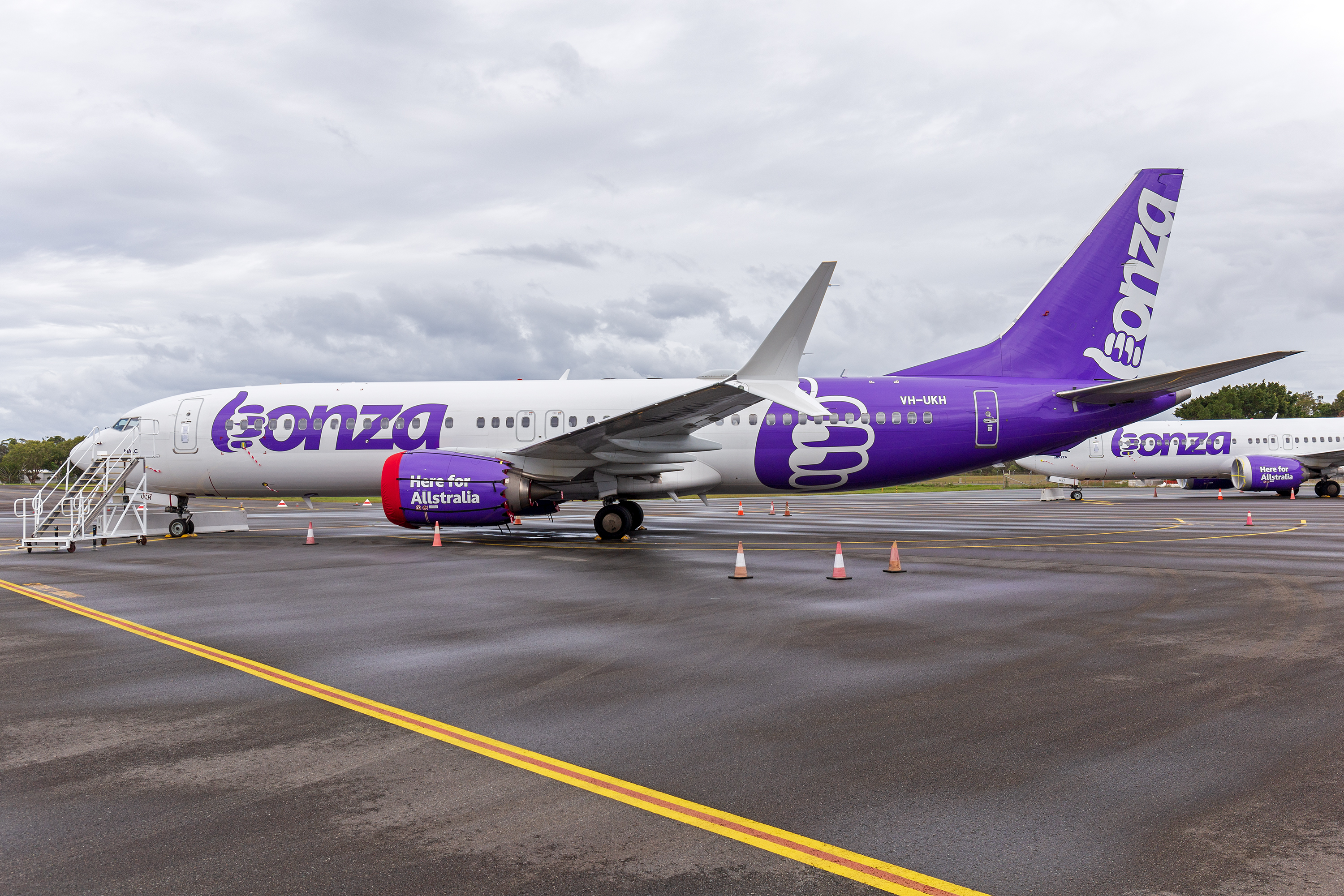
Bonza Boeing 737 MAX 8 parked at Sunshine Coast Airport

Bonza initially revealed its intention to begin flying by early 2022. However, its first routes were only announced in February 2022, and the airline did not receive its air operator's certificate (AOC) from the Civil Aviation Safety Authority until 12 January 2023.

Sales for routes from the Sunshine Coast base began on 27 January 2023 after Bonza had received its AOC. There were eleven initial destinations:

- Albury
- Melbourne (Avalon)
- Cairns
- Coffs Harbour
- Mackay
- Mildura
- Newcastle
- Port Macquarie
- Rockhampton
- Townsville
- Whitsunday Coast

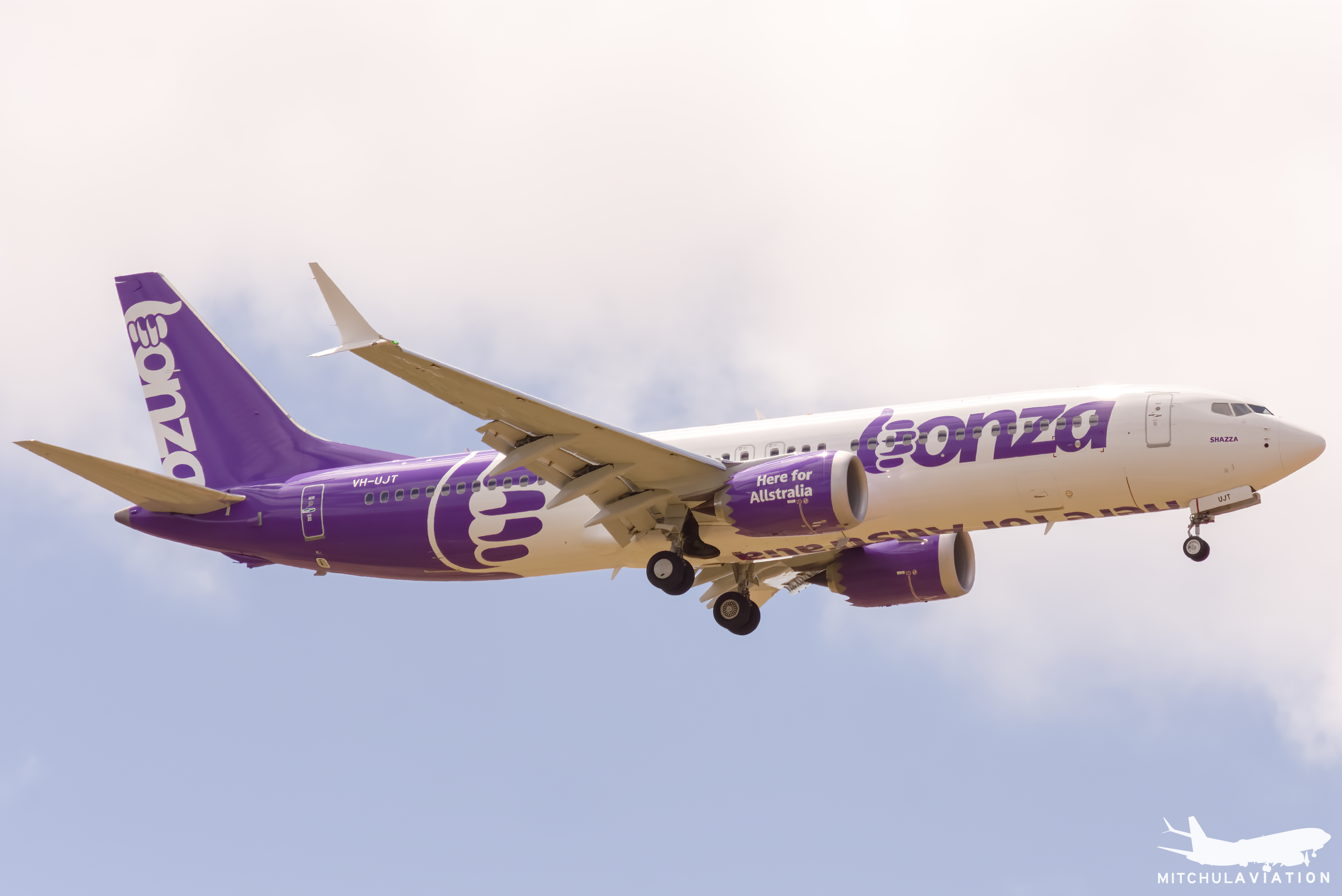
A Bonza Boeing 737 MAX 8 landing at Avalon Airport after a test flight in December 2022.

The airline's initial route map also consisted of several other routes:

- Cairns – Rockhampton
- Cairns – Mackay
- Newcastle – Whitsunday Coast
- Rockhampton – Townsville.

Bonza commenced operations on 31 January 2023, flying from its base at Sunshine Coast to the Whitsundays. They initiated services with Boeing 737 MAX 8 aircraft in an all-economy configuration, becoming the first Australian airline to operate the Boeing 737 MAX.

=== Second base ===
When announcing its initial network in February 2022, the airline also announced a second base in Melbourne.

Tickets for flights to/from the Melbourne base were put on sale on 23 February 2023, with flights to:

- Bundaberg
- Gladstone
- Mackay
- Mildura
- Port Macquarie
- Rockhampton
- Sunshine Coast
- Tamworth
- Toowoomba

Additionally, the airline also launched sales for several other routes:

- Toowoomba – Townsville
- Toowoomba – Whitsunday Coast
- Sunshine Coast – Tamworth.

Flights from the Melbourne base commenced on 30 March 2023 with the inaugural flight to the Sunshine Coast.

=== Reliability issues and network changes ===
Travel Weekly reported in late June that Bonza was attributing a recent increase in flight cancellations to an industry-wide pilot shortage. The airline had cancelled 4% of its flights since February, and had cancelled seven flights that were scheduled to operate in July. The airline's chief operating officer Carly Povey cited crew shortages, a pilot training program that was behind schedule, and aircraft that were temporarily put out of action due to bird strikes and weather events as some of the other causes of the reliability issues.

On 13 July 2023, Bonza announced it would scrap five routes:

- Sunshine Coast – Port Macquarie
- Sunshine Coast – Tamworth
- Sunshine Coast – Coffs Harbour
- Toowoomba – Whitsunday Coast
- Cairns – Mackay.

Whilst the ABC reported Povey stating that the changes were due to a lack of demand, an open letter published on Bonza's website from Povey addressed to the airline's passengers noted that the airline had faced reliability issues and was delaying or cancelling flights, and that changes would allow the airline to focus on routes with "sustainable demand" and also provide spare capacity to mitigate delays and cancellations in case of reliability issues in the future. Apart from the cancelled routes, Bonza also announced frequency reductions by one weekly flight for several routes, and the addition of one weekly service to three routes: Sunshine Coast – Albury, Sunshine Coast – Melbourne (Avalon) and Melbourne (Tullamarine) – Port Macquarie.

The open letter also announced that sales for flights between late October 2023 and April 2024 would commence soon, and that work to establish a third base was progressing.

=== Third base ===
On 1 August 2023, Bonza announced it would open its third base at Gold Coast Airport to coincide with the beginning of the summer holidays. Flights would commence from the new base progressively starting in November, with routes from the Gold Coast to eleven destinations on the airline's existing route network:

- Albury
- Bundaberg
- Cairns
- Gladstone
- Mackay
- Melbourne (Avalon)
- Melbourne (Tullamarine)
- Mildura
- Rockhampton
- Townsville
- Whitsunday Coast

The airline's media release also mentioned that due to global aircraft supply challenges, it would partner with a wet leasing provider to source the additional aircraft required to operate routes from the base.

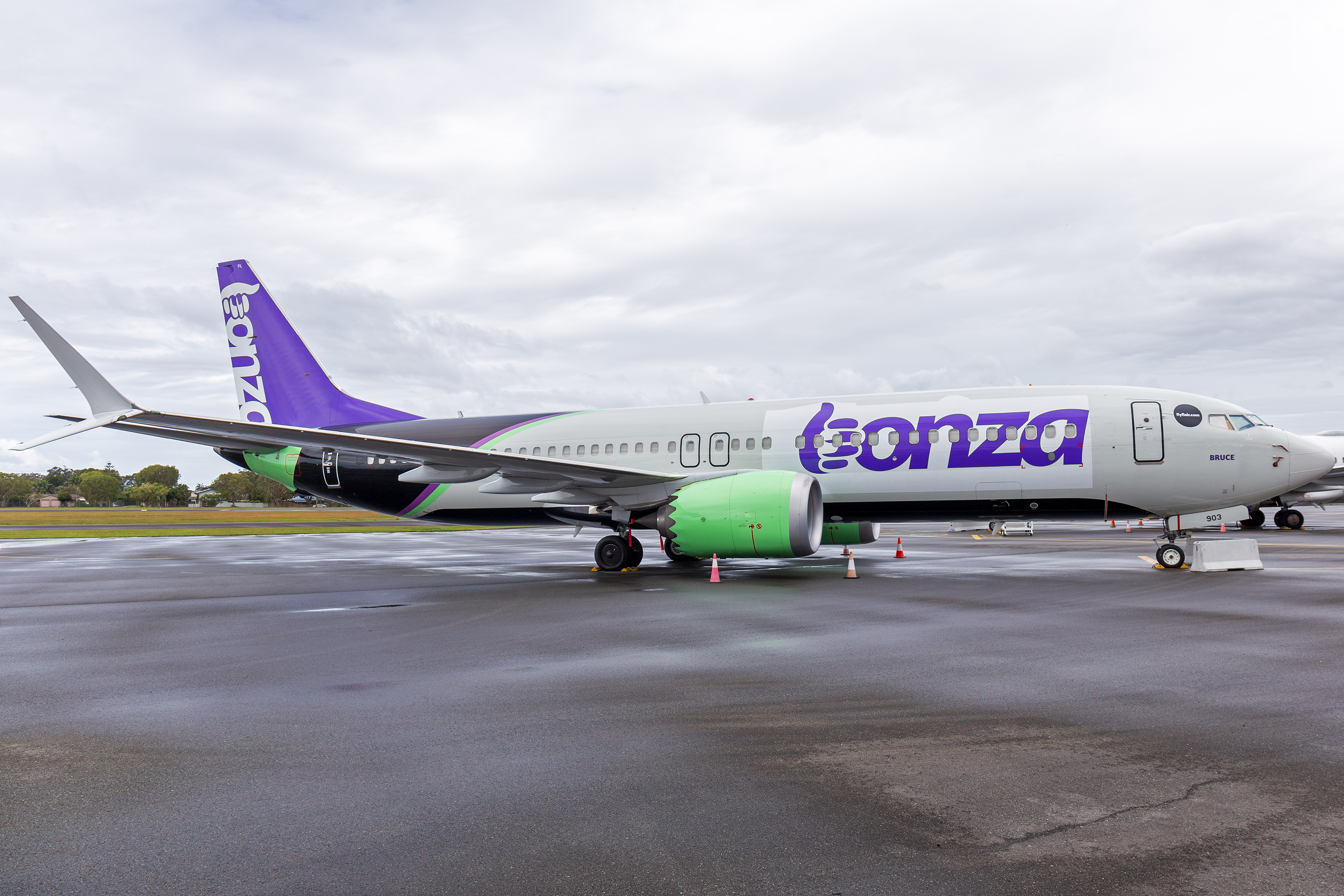
C-FLHI parked at Sunshine Coast Airport, wearing both Bonza and Flair titles.

A few days later, Travel Bulletin reported that a reciprocal wet lease agreement had been entered into with Flair Airlines, which is also backed by 777 Partners and operates a fleet consisting entirely of the Boeing 737. Under the agreement, Bonza would send aircraft and crew to Canada to operate on Flair Airlines routes during the North American peak travel season, and Flair Airlines would do the same with their aircraft and crew for Bonza during the Australian peak travel season, hence providing additional capacity for both airlines during peak travel periods. Flair Airlines stated that it would wet lease two aircraft to Bonza for its Gold Coast base.

On 24 August 2023, Bonza announced an additional route from the Gold Coast to Launceston, and hinted at additional routes from Launceston to be announced in the future. The route announcement marks the airline's entry into Tasmania, the fourth state to be serviced by the airline. Flights on the Gold Coast – Launceston route would start in November, around the same time as flights on the previously announced 11 routes would commence.

On 18 September 2023, a twice-weekly Gold Coast to Mount Isa route was announced, which would commence on 5 December 2023.

Two days later, the airline announced and launched sales for three new twice-weekly routes: Sunshine Coast to Darwin, Gold Coast to Darwin and Melbourne to Alice Springs. The launch of the routes will mark the airline's entry into the Northern Territory, its fifth Australian state or territory, which were the result of Northern Territory Government subsidies provided through its Territory Aviation Attraction Scheme, and the 20th and 21st destinations on its network. On 30 November 2023, the airline cancelled all planned flights between Darwin and the Gold Coast during December, only hours before the first scheduled flight on the route.

The airline aimed to expand its operations to Shellharbour Airport, serving the Wollongong region, following planned upgrades to the airport facilities. But the route never went ahead.

In late September, Bonza announced and launched Bonza Holidays, a package holiday booking scheme that bundles accommodation with flights and optional travel insurance.

=== Suspension of operations ===
On the morning of 30 April 2024, Bonza passengers arrived to the airport to find all Bonza flights had been cancelled. It was subsequently revealed that at 11:51 pm AEST (UTC+10) on 29 April 2024, the leasers of Bonza's aircraft had issued notices terminating the leases for the aircraft. Later that same morning, Bonza's chief executive Tim Jordan confirmed the airline had temporarily suspended services amid discussions regarding the ongoing viability of the business. On the afternoon of 30 April 2024, documents were filed with the Australian Securities and Investments Commission declaring Bonza had entered voluntary administration and would be externally administered by accounting firm Hall Chadwick. The administrator announced that all Bonza flights would be temporarily cancelled until 2 May 2024. However, this temporary cancellation of flights was extended numerous times first to 7 May 2024, then 14 May 2024 and finally to 29 May 2024 with flights ultimately never resuming. Between 9 May and 5 June 2024, all of Bonza's aircraft were gradually removed from Australia and flown overseas by their lessors.

In response to Bonza's administration, Jetstar, Qantas, and Virgin Australia announced that Bonza customers scheduled to travel on 30 April 2024, or stranded away from home due to the airline's operational suspension would be offered complimentary flights, subject to seat availability.

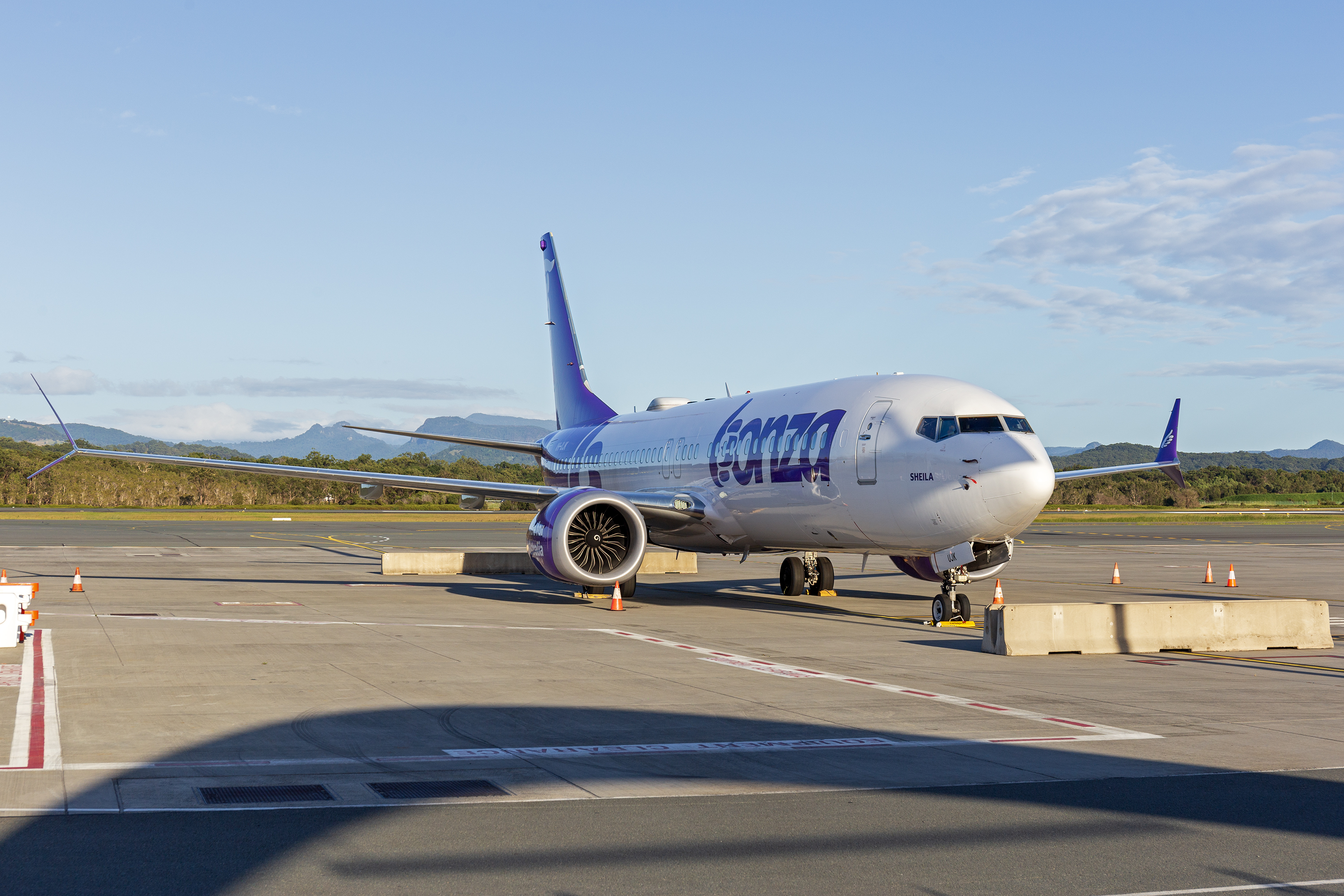
VH-UJK (Sheila) at Gold Coast Airport in May 2024

On 7 May 2024 during a Federal Court of Australia hearing in Sydney, it was revealed that creditors included 57,933 customers with forward bookings, 323 employees, and 120 trade creditors. Furthermore, negotiations since the grounding between Bonza and the lessors of the aircraft were revealed to have failed, leaving the company unable to use its aircraft. At Bonza Airline's creditors meeting held in Sydney on 10 May 2024, administrators disclosed that the airline had outstanding debts exceeding A$116 million to various stakeholders. This included $77M in loans, $4.6M in unpaid aircraft leases, $10.5M in outstanding airport fees, $16M owed to trade suppliers and $5.3M to staff.

On 27 May 2024, the Federal Court of Australia granted Hall Chadwick a two-month extension to administration period, until 29 July, with the aim of selling the company. Hall Chadwick argued that avoiding liquidation would benefit employees and creditors. They emphasised to the court that the most valuable asset of the airline is its Air Operator's Certificate (AOC), which could be at risk of cancellation by the Civil Aviation Safety Authority (CASA) if liquidation occurs. Hall Chadwick informed the court that discussions with two potential buyers were ongoing, and finalising a sale agreement may take two to three weeks.

On 11 June 2024, Bonza's administrators officially terminated all 323 staff and cancelled all future flights. At the time as the administrators were yet to liquidate Bonza, the terminated staff were not yet able to claim back unpaid wages and entitlements via the Australian Federal Government's Fair Entitlement Guarantee scheme. It was also reported that no formal offers to purchase Bonza had been submitted to the administrator.

On 2 July 2024, Bonza's creditors voted to liquidate the company after administrators failed to find a buyer.

== Sponsorships ==
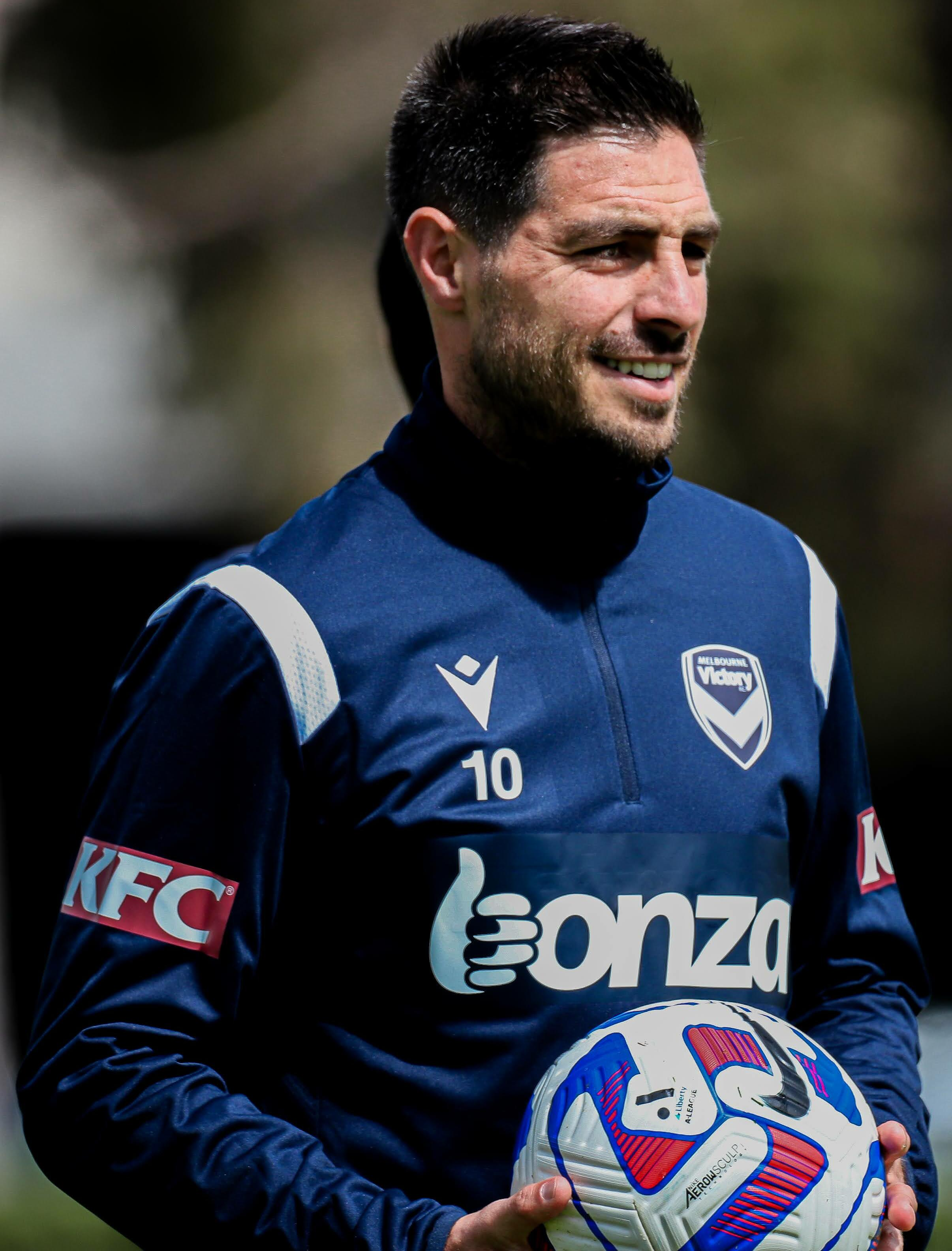
Bonza previously served as the front of shirt sponsor for Melbourne Victory FC

On 4 October 2022, Bonza announced a four-year sponsorship deal with Australian A-League Men's football club Melbourne Victory to be their front-of-shirt principal partner on both their home and away kits. Melbourne Victory acquired a new principal partner in 2024.

== Destinations ==
On 30 April 2024, when operations ceased Bonza operated the following 38 routes and served 21 destinations in New South Wales, Northern Territory, Queensland, Tasmania and Victoria.

State/Territory	City	Airport	Notes
New South Wales	Albury	Albury Airport	
New South Wales	Coffs Harbour	Coffs Harbour Airport	Terminated
New South Wales	Newcastle	Newcastle Airport	
New South Wales	Port Macquarie	Port Macquarie Airport	
New South Wales	Tamworth	Tamworth Airport	
Northern Territory	Alice Springs	Alice Springs Airport	
Northern Territory	Darwin	Darwin International Airport	
Queensland	Bundaberg	Bundaberg Airport	
Queensland	Cairns	Cairns Airport	
Queensland	Gladstone	Gladstone Airport	
Queensland	Gold Coast	Gold Coast Airport	Base
Queensland	Mackay	Mackay Airport	
Queensland	Mount Isa	Mount Isa Airport	
Queensland	Proserpine	Whitsunday Coast Airport	
Queensland	Rockhampton	Rockhampton Airport	
Queensland	Sunshine Coast	Sunshine Coast Airport	Base
Queensland	Toowoomba	Toowoomba Wellcamp Airport	
Queensland	Townsville	Townsville Airport	
Tasmania	Launceston	Launceston Airport	
Victoria	Melbourne / Geelong	Avalon Airport	
Victoria	Melbourne	Melbourne Airport	Base
Victoria	Mildura	Mildura Airport	

== Fleet ==
Bonza's fleet reached its peak of six aircraft in December 2023, by leasing two additional Canadian-registered Boeing 737 MAX 8 aircraft from its sister airline, Flair. The leasing agreement had encountered months of delays with Australian Government regulator Civil Aviation Safety Authority (CASA) requiring Bonza to demonstrate how they would integrate the Canadian-registered aircraft and crew into their operation to ensure aviation safety leading to the delay.

Bonza planned to convert these wet lease agreements into dry leases and register the aircraft in Australia. However, Bonza faced challenges in converting two short-term wet lease contracts into longer-term dry leases as the planes required recertification by government regulators. Consequently, one of the leased Boeing 737 MAX 8 aircraft returned to Flair in Canada in early March 2024, while the other remained parked at Sunshine Coast Airport since early March 2024. With the latter aircraft awaiting approval from CASA to operate under dry lease terms.

Due to a lightning strike incident on one of Bonza's 737 Max aircraft in November 2023 leading to a shortage of aircraft to operate Bonza's scheduled routes, Bonza entered into temporary wet lease agreement with Nauru Airlines. Under the agreement Nauru Airlines operated on behalf of Bonza on some Bonza routes using Nauru Airlines B737-800 and B737-300 aircraft. However, in early April 2024 Nauru Airlines abruptly terminated the agreement. On 10 May 2024 following Bonza entering voluntary administration the Australian Financial Review reported that Bonza owed Nauru Airlines around A$1 million in unpaid aircraft leases.

On 30 April 2024, creditors repossessed all of Bonza's fleet of Boeing 737 MAX 8 aircraft. The Canadian-registered aircraft, C-FLHI "Bruce", was flown out of Australia under a Flair callsign to Canada on 9 May 2024. Following this, VH-UIK "Bazza", VH-UKH "Malc", VH-UJT "Shazza" and VH-UJK "Sheila" were all flown out of Australia to France on 11, 15, 20 May and 5 June 2024, respectively.

As of 30 April 2024, when operations ceased, the Bonza fleet consisted of the following aircraft:

Aircraft	Number	Orders	Passengers	Notes
Boeing 737 MAX 8	4	—	186	All repossessed.
Total	4	—		

Bonza's 737 MAX 8 fleet consisted of 186 seats in an all-economy layout. Seats are laid out in a 3-3 configuration.
