= Port Macquarie Airport =

Airport in New South Wales, Australia

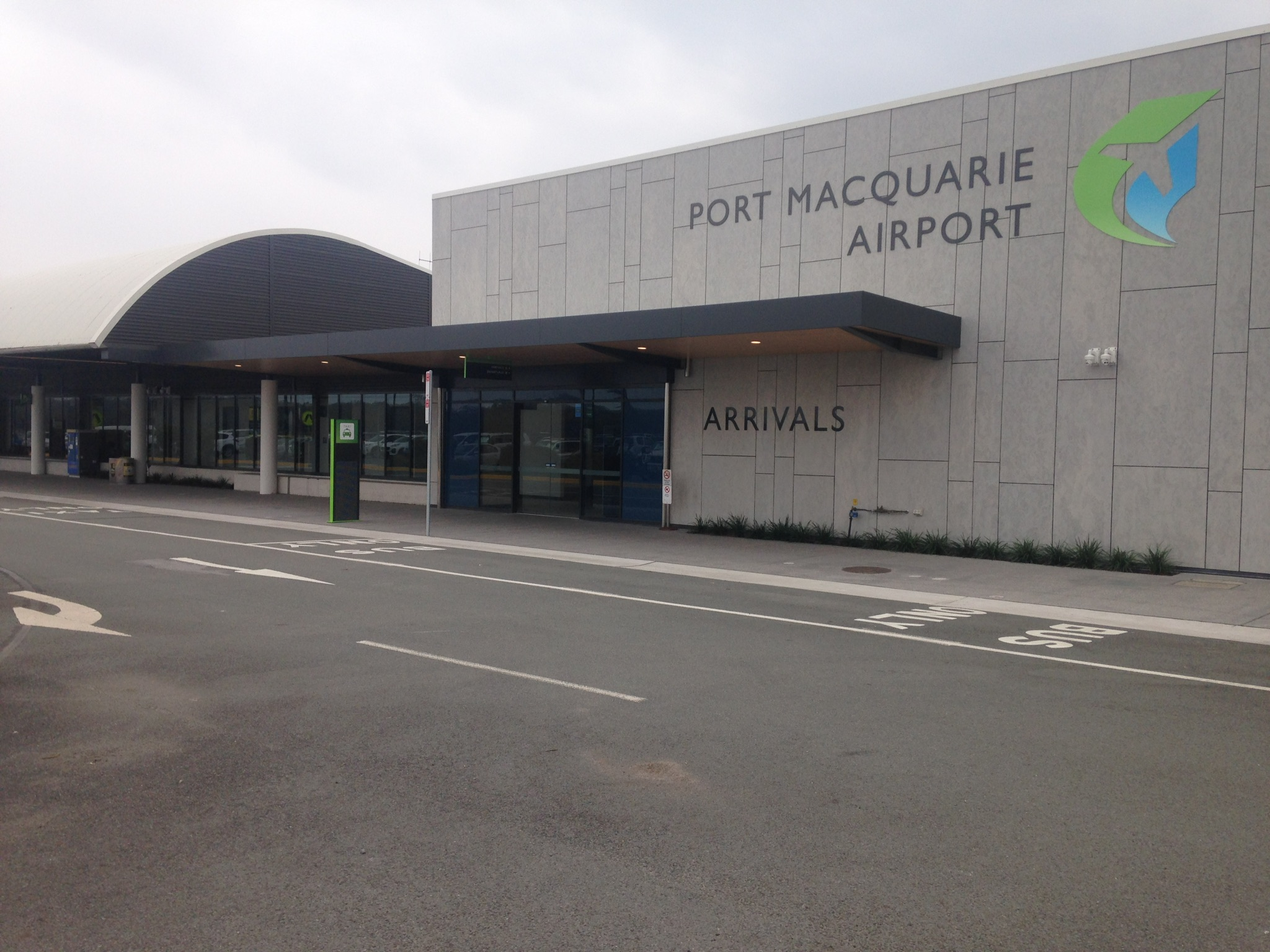
- IATA: PQQ; ICAO: YPMQ

Summary
- Airport type: Public
- Operator: Port Macquarie-Hastings Council
- Serves: Port Macquarie, New South Wales
- Hub for: Eastern Air Services
- Elevation AMSL: 15 ft (4.6 m)
- Coordinates: 31°26′09″S 152°51′48″E
- Website: https://www.portmacquarieairport.com.au

Map
- Location in New South Wales

Runways
Direction	Length		Surface
Direction	m	ft	Surface
03/21	1,800	5,906	Asphalt

Statistics (2023–24)
- Passengers: 226,932
- Aircraft movements: 5,529
- Sources: Australian AIP and aerodrome chart. Passengers and aircraft movements from BITRE.

Port Macquarie Airport (IATA: PQQ, ICAO: YPMQ) is an airport in Port Macquarie, New South Wales, Australia. The airport is 2.25 nautical miles (4.17 km; 2.59 mi) west of the city centre and is owned and managed by the Port Macquarie-Hastings Council on behalf of its owners – the constituents of the Hastings. The ownership is not to be confused with the Port Macquarie Airport Proprietary Limited. The airport had 226,932 revenue passengers making it the 33rd busiest in Australia in 2023–24.

== Airlines and destinations ==
Airlines	Destinations
Eastern Air Services	Lord Howe Island
QantasLink	Brisbane, Sydney
Rex Airlines	Sydney (ends 25 October 2026)

Historically a number of airlines have flown to the airfield. These include:

- Virgin Australia
- JetGo
- Bonza
- Ansett Australia
- Hazelton Airlines
- Kendell Airlines
- East-West Airlines
- FlyPelican
- Brindabella Airlines

== Virgin Australia ==
On 4 February 2008, Virgin Blue (now Virgin Australia) commenced direct scheduled services between Sydney and Port Macquarie. The flights operated daily in the morning. The service used to be operated by an Embraer E-170 aircraft, and was the first scheduled jet service for the airport. Connections were offered to all major Australian cities via Sydney. An increase to twice-daily service commenced 4 August 2008.

Competition by Virgin resulted in a significant drop in fare prices for the Port Macquarie - Sydney route, where Qantas previously operated a monopoly after Hazelton Airlines ceased services in 2001.

On 28 July 2011, Virgin Australia (in partnership with Skywest Airlines) announced its intention to commence a daily Brisbane to Port Macquarie service from October 2011. On 19 October 2011, Virgin Australia's ATR 72 departed on its first flight to Brisbane. The airline also announced that, as a result of the removal of Embraer 170 aircraft from its fleet, Sydney to Port Macquarie services would also be operated by ATR72 aircraft.

Both routes have since been withdrawn due to the removal of ATR72 aircraft from the Virgin Australia fleet in 2020.

== Aircraft operations ==
Busiest domestic routes into and out of Port Macquarie (year ending December 2025)
Rank	Airport	Passengers	% change	Carriers
1	Sydney	166,595	▲0.5	Rex, QantasLink
2	Brisbane	no data yet	no data yet	QantasLink

Connections to Brisbane (via Coffs Harbour) by Brindabella Airlines ceased 31 December 2010, citing poor loads on the route. Despite this, Virgin Australia entered the route on 19 October 2011 as a daily service with their ATR72 aircraft.

== See also ==
- List of airports in New South Wales
