= FlyPelican =

Regional airline of Australia

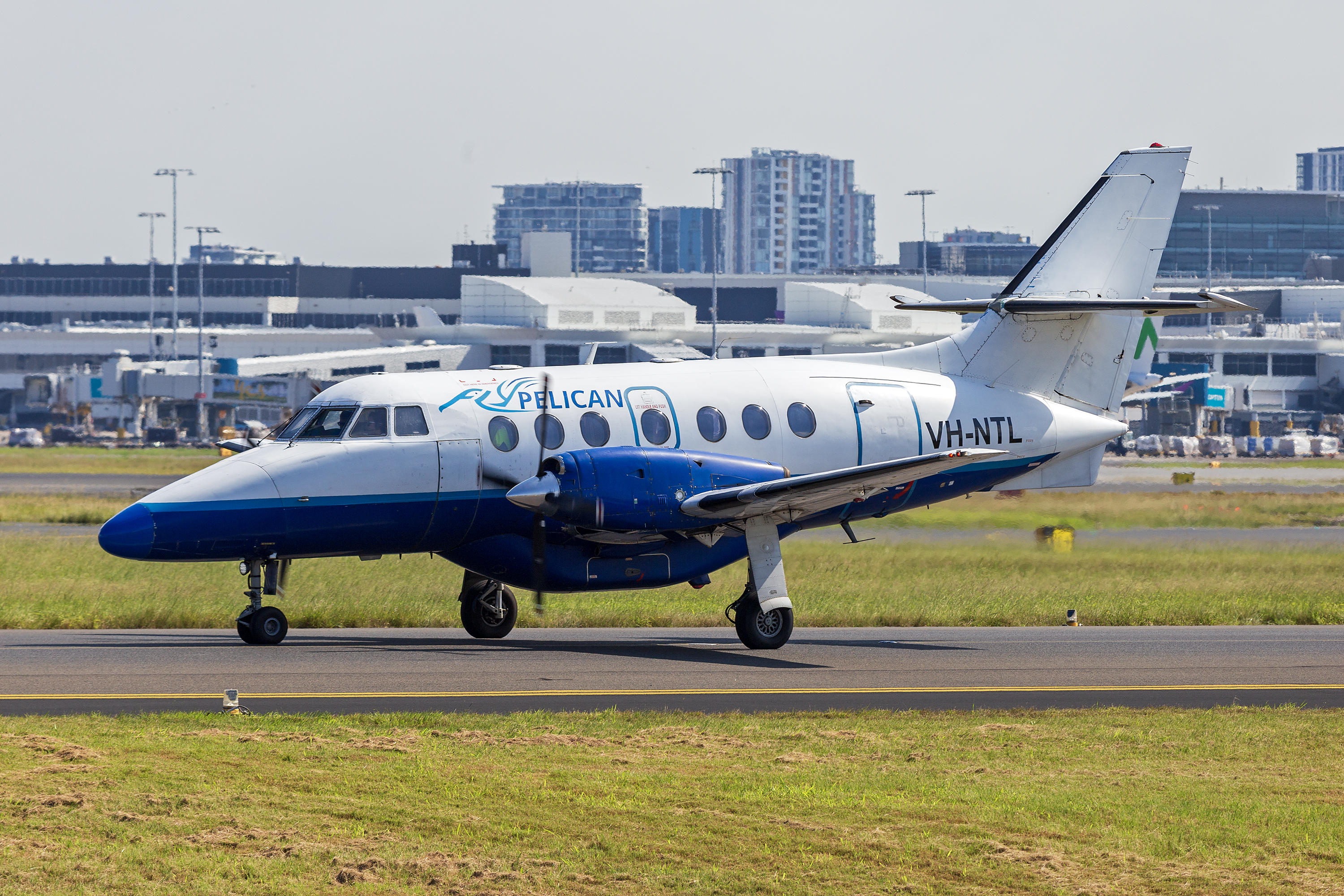
IATA	ICAO	Call sign
FP	—	PELICAN
- Founded: 2014; 12 years ago
- Operating bases: Newcastle Airport
- Fleet size: 6
- Destinations: 6
- Headquarters: Newcastle, New South Wales, Australia
- Key people: Marty Hawley (CEO); Paul Graham (Director); Emil McCabe (Director)
- Website: www.flypelican.com.au

Pelican Airlines Pty Ltd, operating as FlyPelican, is an Australian regional airline. Created by former Aeropelican staff with its previous aircraft fleet, FlyPelican initially operated air charter services and subsequently commenced scheduled flights on 1 June 2015. The airline is currently the only airline based in Newcastle, New South Wales, with its main base at Newcastle Airport.

FlyPelican offers both Regular Public Transport Services to destinations across NSW, ACT, QLD and Adhoc / Contracted charters. The company slogan is Fly Local, Fly Pelican.

== Destinations ==
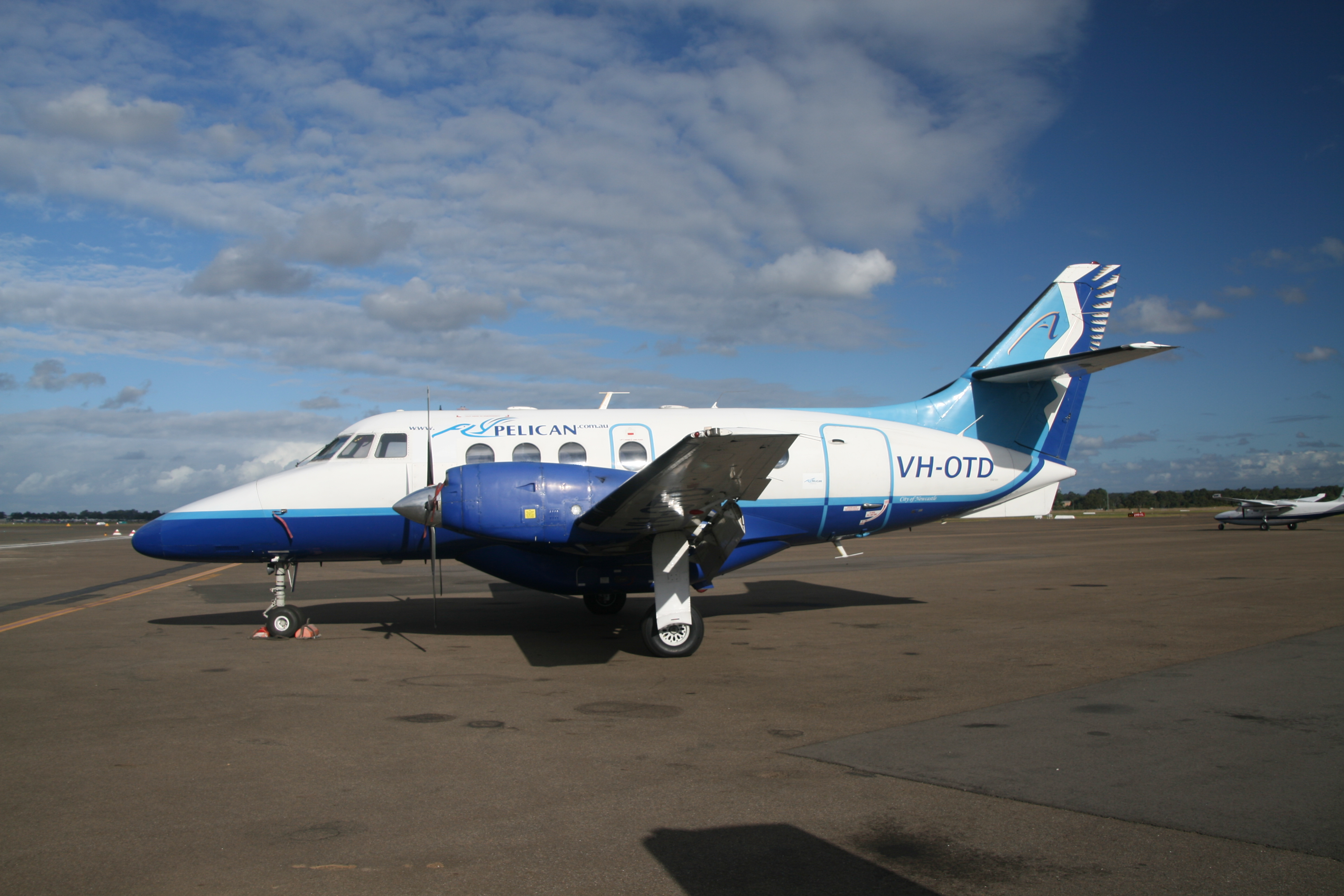
FlyPelican Jetstream 32 at Bankstown Airport

As of April 2025, in addition to regular and adhoc charters, FlyPelican operates to the following destinations:

Australian Capital Territory

- Canberra
  - Canberra Airport

New South Wales

- Narrabri
  - Narrabri Airport
- Cobar
  - Cobar Airport
- Newcastle
  - Newcastle Airport
- Gold Coast
  - Gold Coast Airport
- Sydney
  - Sydney Airport

Victoria

- Melbourne / Geelong
  - Avalon Airport

=== Terminated destinations ===
New South Wales

- Taree
  - Taree Airport
- Port Macquarie
  - Port Macquarie Airport
- Dubbo
  - Dubbo Airport
- Bathurst
  - Bathurst Airport
- Ballina
  - Ballina Byron Gateway Airport
- Albury
  - Albury Airport
- Mudgee
  - Mudgee Airport

South Australia

- Adelaide
  - Adelaide Airport (operated March 2018 to April 2019 by Alliance Airlines)

Queensland

- Sunshine Coast
  - Sunshine Coast Airport

=== Interline agreements ===
- Qantas

== Fleet ==
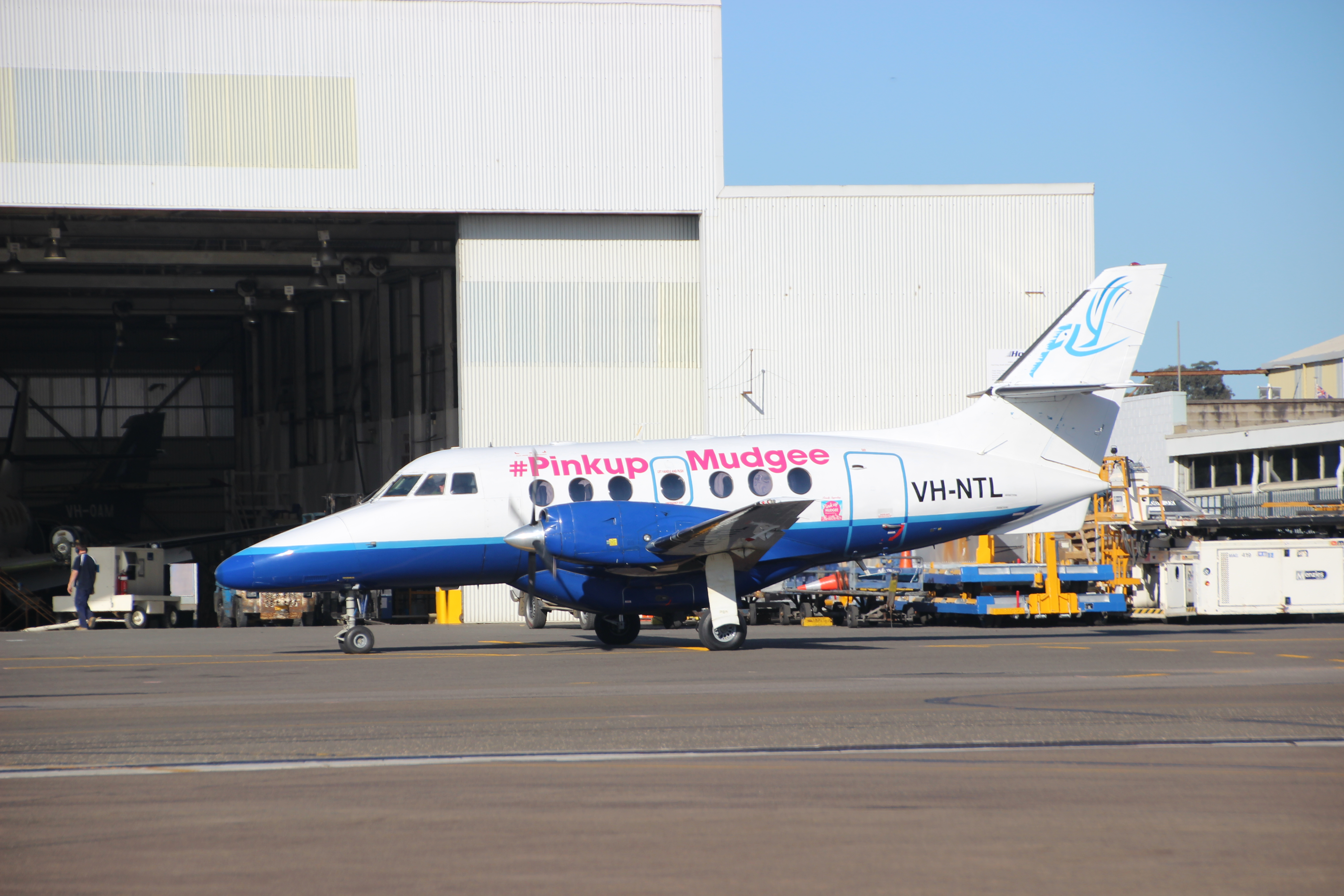
FlyPelican Jetstream 32 with special colours promoting fundraising for the McGrath Foundation

As of August 2026, FlyPelican operates the following aircraft:

FlyPelican fleet
Aircraft	In fleet	Passengers
British Aerospace Jetstream 31	5	19
British Aerospace Jetstream 41	1	30

== See also ==
- List of airlines of Australia
