= Gold Coast Airport =

Airport on the state border between Queensland and New South Wales, Australia

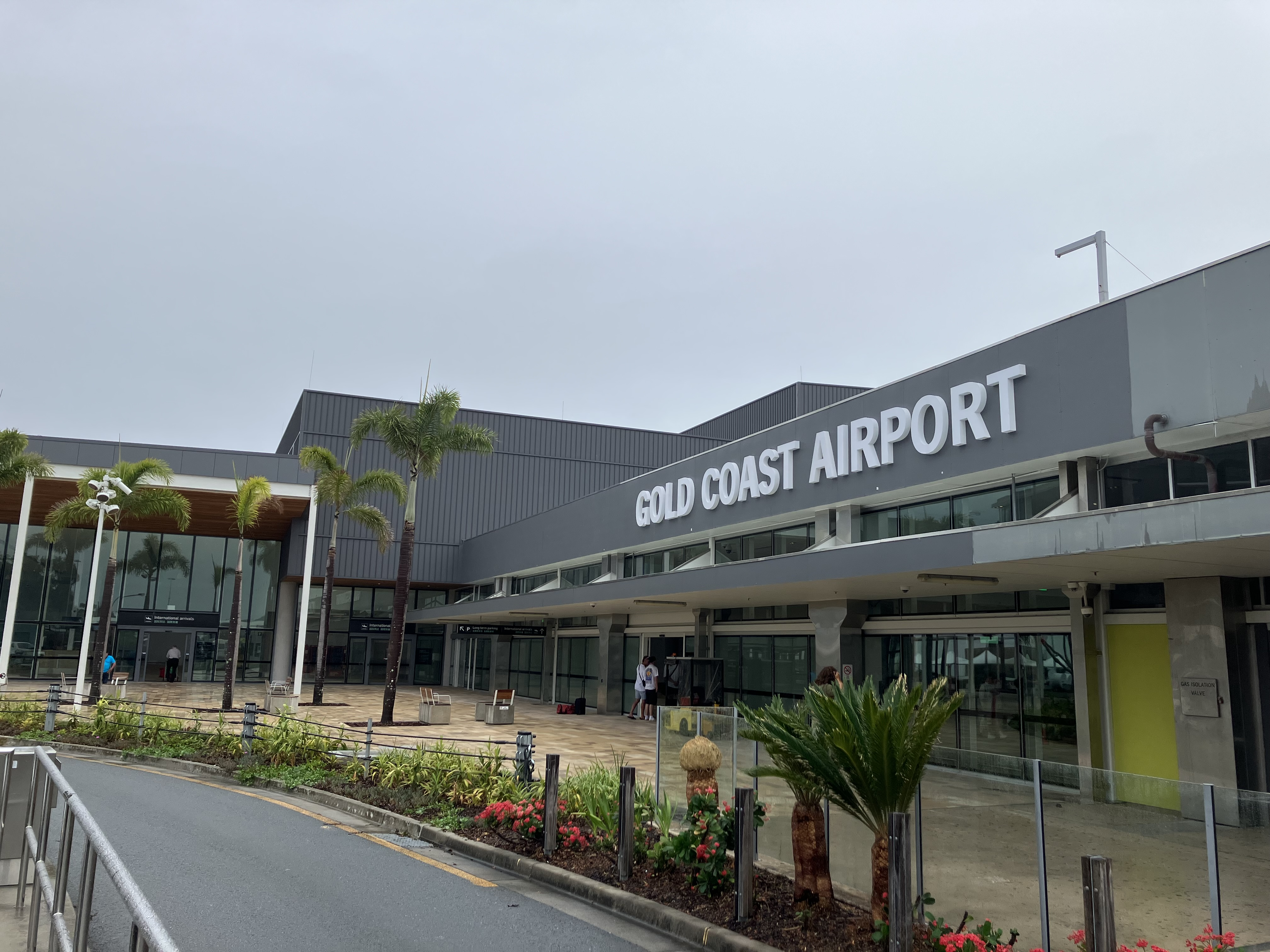
- IATA: OOL; ICAO: YBCG; WMO: 94592

Summary
- Airport type: Public
- Owner/Operator: Queensland Airports
- Serves: Gold Coast–Tweed Heads
- Location: Bilinga, Queensland; Tweed Heads West, New South Wales
- Focus city for: Virgin Australia
- Operating base for: Jetstar
- Elevation AMSL: 21 ft (6.4 m)
- Coordinates: 28°09′54″S 153°30′22″E
- Website: goldcoastairport.com.au

Map
- Interactive map of Gold Coast Airport

Runways
Direction	Length		Surface
Direction	m	ft	Surface
14/32	2,492	8,176	Asphalt
17/35	582	1,909	Asphalt

Statistics (2024-25)
- Passenger movements: ▼5,998,280
- Aircraft movements: ▼37,466
- Sources: AIP passenger and aircraft movements from the Bureau of Infrastructure, Transport and Regional Economics (BITRE)

Gold Coast Airport (IATA: OOL, ICAO: YBCG), formerly known as Coolangatta Airport, is an international airport located at the southern end of the Gold Coast. The entrance to the airport is situated in the suburb of Bilinga, located approximately 90 km (56 mi) south of Brisbane as part of the South East Queensland agglomeration. The main runway itself cuts through the Australian state borders of Queensland and New South Wales, though the airport operates on Queensland Time (year-round AEST / UTC+10) and laws.

The facility occupies 371 hectares (917 acres) of airport property.

== History ==
Until 1989, the airport was known as Coolangatta Airport. This is an Aboriginal word meaning "Place of Good View". It originally consisted (1936) of three grass strips with the intention of only providing an emergency landing ground for airmail aircraft transiting between Brisbane and Sydney. Passenger flights took off for the first time in 1939 using the then grassy field of the current Coolangatta site. Regular services were started by Queensland Airlines and Butler Air Transport after World War II. Ansett started its own services in 1950 using Douglas DC-3s, while Trans Australia Airlines did the same in 1954, also using DC-3s as well as Douglas DC-4s and Convair 440s to link other Australian cities.

By 1958, the taxiways and runways were fully paved, with the latter upgraded a decade later to allow jet operations with McDonnell Douglas DC-9 and Lockheed L-188 Electra aircraft to begin. The current terminal, known as the Eric Robinson Building, was officially opened in 1981 by Acting Prime Minister Douglas Anthony, when at the time more than 650,000 passengers were using the airport. The following year, the main runway was lengthened to 2,042 m (6,699 ft), thus permitting the use of wide-body jets by the two domestic operators Ansett Australia and Trans Australia Airlines and their Boeing 767 and Airbus A300 respectively on flights from Melbourne and Sydney.

From 1 January 1988, the airport was managed by the Federal Airports Corporation on behalf of the Government. A decade later, on 29 May 1998, the airport was privatised via a long-term lease to Queensland Airports (QAL). By 1999 the company's name had changed to become Gold Coast Airport Pty Ltd (GCAPL). The airport then suffered from the collapse of Ansett in 2001, as Ansett had operated direct services from the Gold Coast to 12 Australian destinations.

In 2003, GCAPL was taken over by QAL, which today also leases and operates Mount Isa Airport, Townsville Airport and Longreach Airport.

Despite the name change from Coolangatta Airport to Gold Coast Airport, the airport retains its original IATA code, OOL and ICAO code, YBCG. The Airport ownership remains with the Government of Australia.

In 1989, the airport welcomed its first international charter service from New Zealand, and by 1999 Air New Zealand low-cost subsidiary Freedom Air started scheduled no-frills service from Hamilton, New Zealand with Boeing 737s. In 2007 the airport celebrated the arrival of AirAsia X, which began services directly to Kuala Lumpur, Malaysia, and Tigerair Australia, which started services to Melbourne. Subsequently, the airport has had flights from Air Pacific from Nadi, Fiji. Jetstar to Tokyo and Osaka. Services to New Zealand increased as well, with Jetstar, Air New Zealand and Pacific Blue flying to Auckland, Wellington and Christchurch. Airnorth also started services to the airport from Darwin, via Mount Isa. In addition, Virgin Blue announced direct services from Canberra and Townsville. This opened up connections between all three Queensland Airports-owned airports – Mount Isa Airport, Townsville Airport and Gold Coast Airport.

In 2010 Jetstar announced the airport as its newest hub, increased services to Cairns and introduced direct services to Perth (suspended in 2013 but resumed in 2015) and Queenstown. Tiger Airways also announced their newest base at Avalon Airport in Geelong, and said that services from Avalon to the Gold Coast would commence later in the year; however, services to Adelaide would be cut due to delays in receiving new aircraft which were intended for their new Avalon base.

On 26 October 2010, Gold Coast Airport was named the 2010 Major Airport of the Year 2010 by the Australian Airports Association (AAA).

The Gold Coast Airport served as the official airport of the 2018 Commonwealth Games.

In July 2023, Scoot suspended its Gold Coast route indefinitely, citing operational costs, leaving no direct route between the Gold Coast and Singapore.

On 1 August 2023, Bonza announced it would open its third base at Gold Coast Airport, flying on 14 routes, 11 of which are not flown by other airlines. Bonza launched the new routes starting November 2023, but ceased all operations when it declared bankruptcy in April 2024.

In October 2023, Jetstar replaced its Gold Coast to Tokyo route with Brisbane, to better utilise resources.

On 17 July 2024, AirAsia X announced it was ceasing operations to the Gold Coast from 1 December 2024 due to operational costs.

== Infrastructure ==
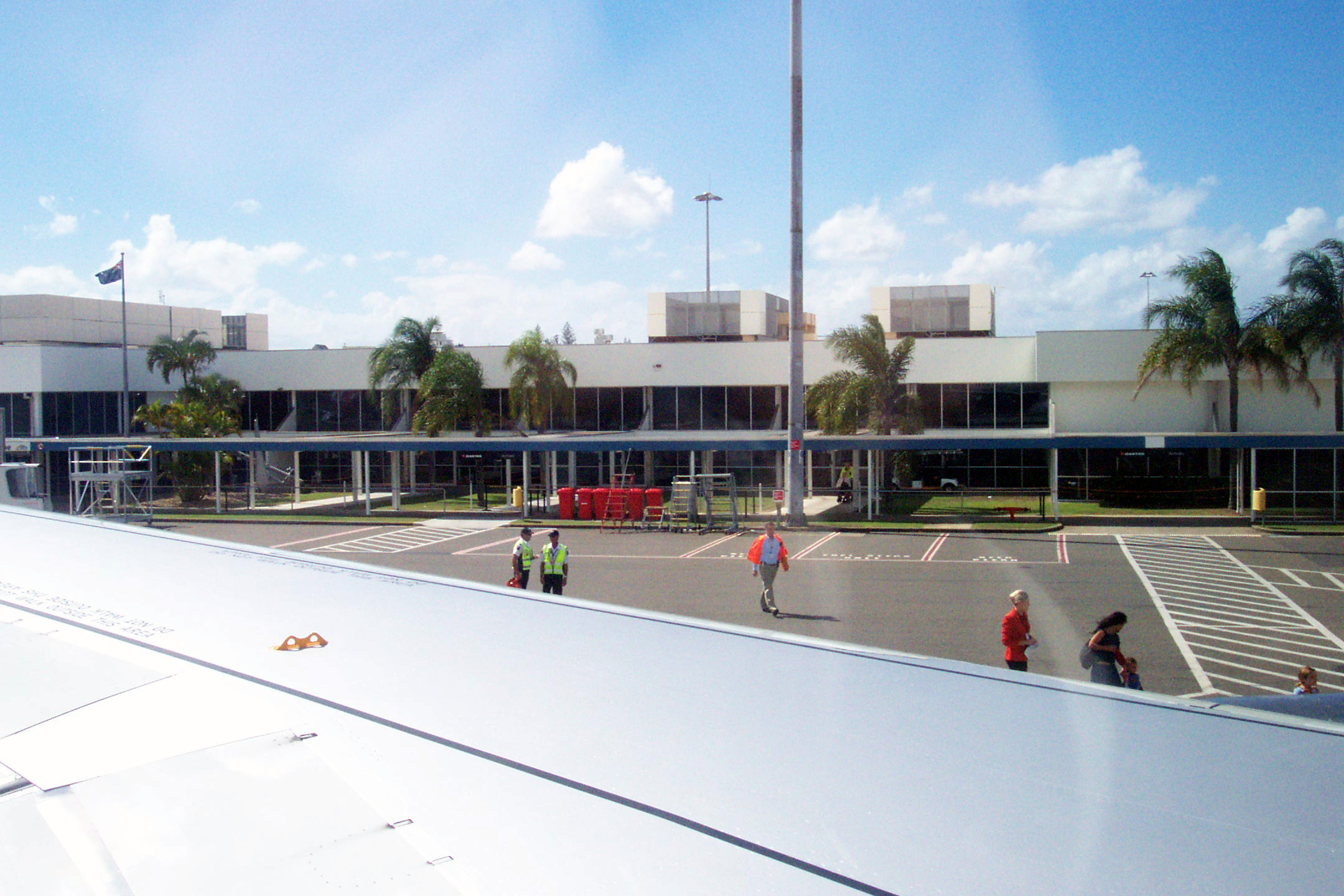
Eric Robinson terminal from the tarmac

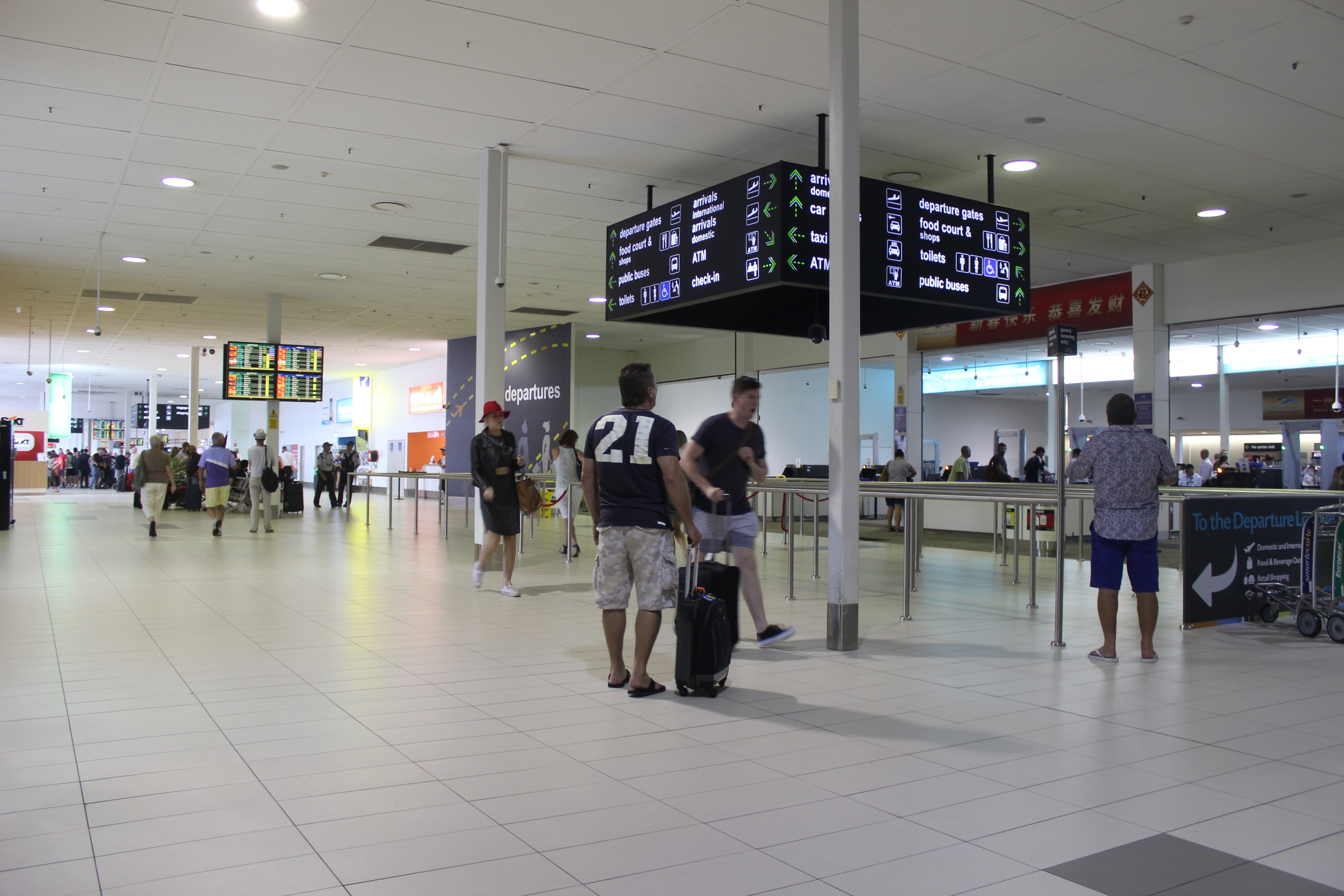
Inside the newly refurbished terminal building in 2015

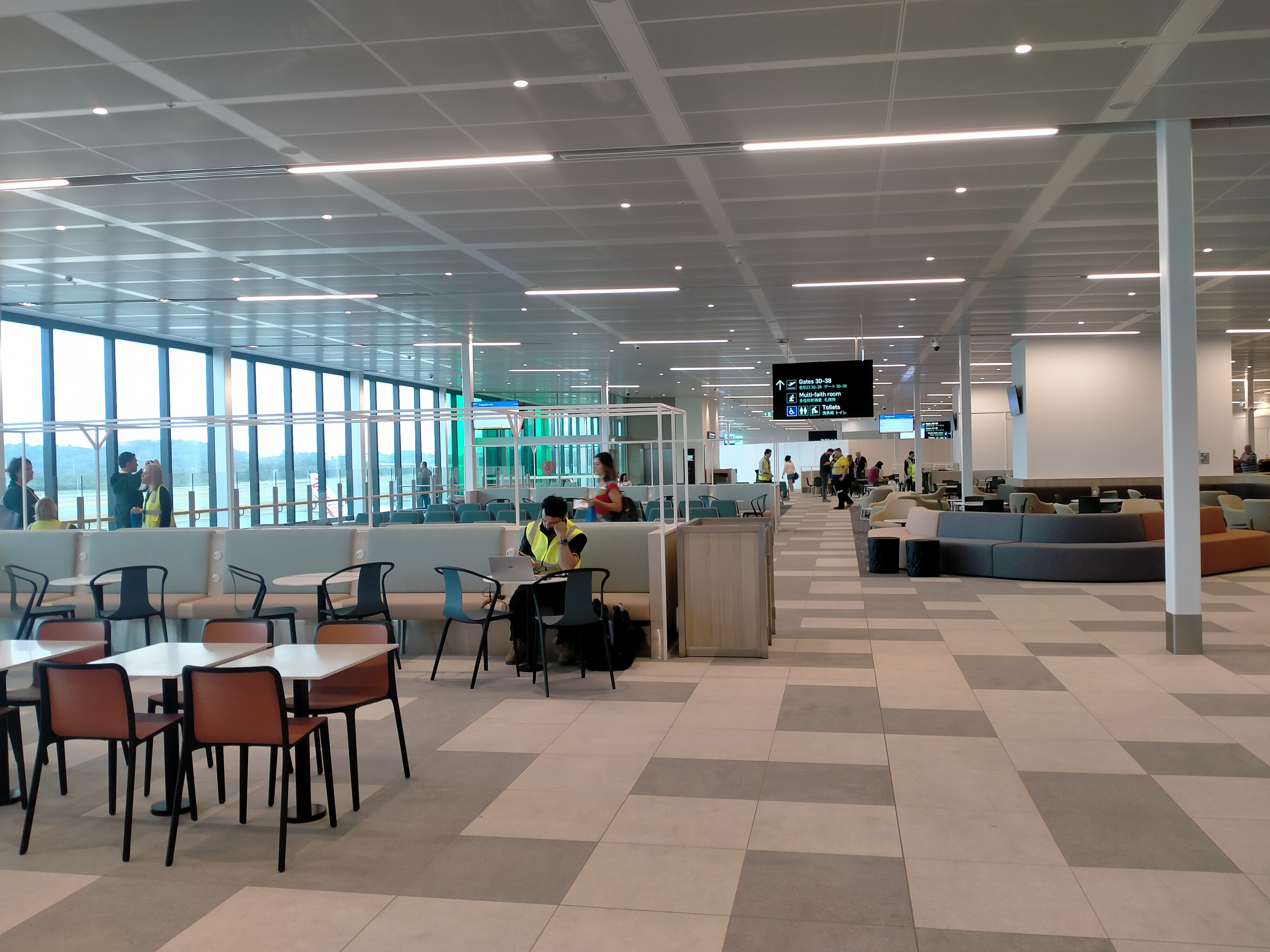
Departures lounge and dining in the 2022 terminal extension

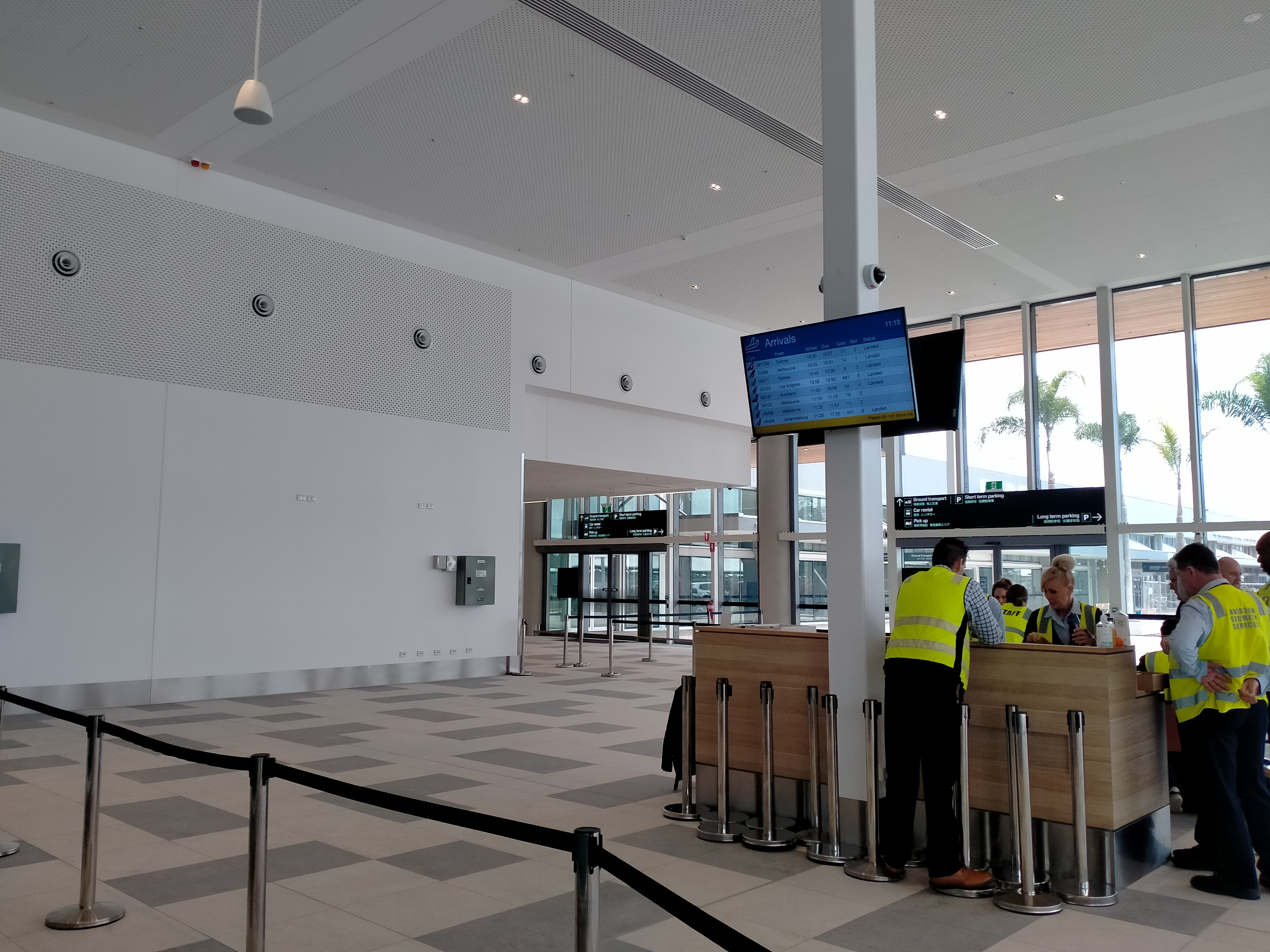
Arrivals area in the 2022 terminal extension

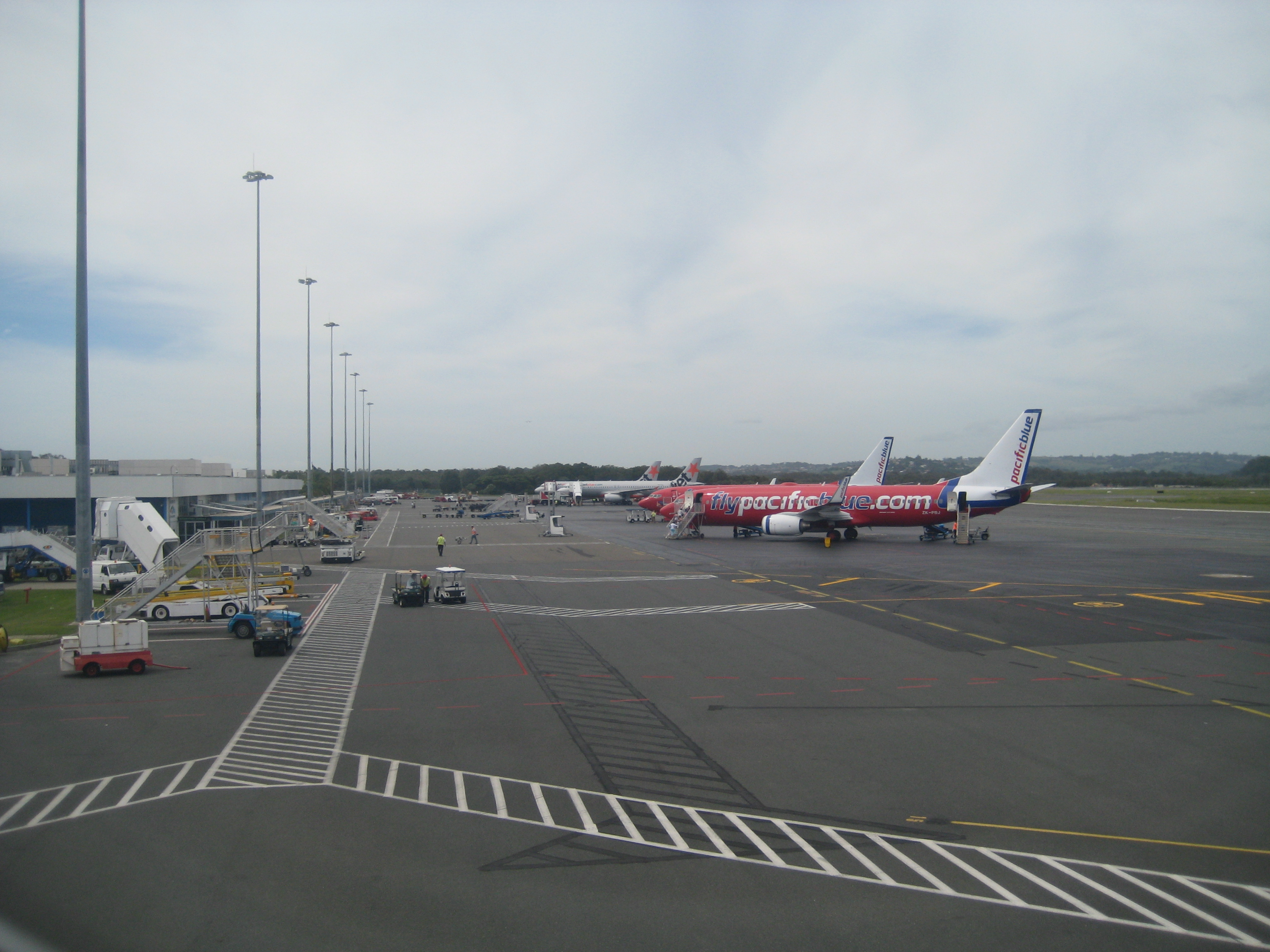
Gold Coast apron view in 2008. Before refurbishment.

In 2008, the Tugun Bypass opened with a 334 metre motorway tunnel under the runway.

The airport opened an extension to the main runway as well as a full-length parallel taxiway in May 2007. The runway is 2,482 m (8,143 ft) long, allowing for heavier aircraft with greater range to takeoff.

On 16 May 2007, the runway extension was officially inaugurated by Minister for Transport, Mark Vaile.

Gold Coast Airport appointed ADCO Constructions as the principal design and construct contractor for a $100-million redevelopment of the airport's main terminal. Completed in 2010, the project doubled the size of the existing facility to almost 27,000 m^{2} (290,000 sq ft), incorporating domestic and international operations with self-service kiosks and 40 common-user check-in desks. The works will accommodate forecast growth for the next 10 years with a further expansion, stage two, scheduled to kick in upon demand. The main terminal – Terminal 1 – currently houses operations for Qantas, Jetstar, Virgin Australia, Rex, Air New Zealand.

Before moving to the main terminal, Tigerair Australia flights previously operated from a low-cost terminal with basic amenities, located approximately 200 m (660 ft) from the main terminal building.

An instrument landing system (ILS) was scheduled to be installed at the airport by June 2015 to enable planes to land during adverse weather conditions. It would be a required navigation performance (RNP) system rather than a traditional ILS as this would allow planes to cross the coast at Currumbin rather than Surfers Paradise and therefore fly over fewer houses. The proposed ILS had become an issue with residents concerned with noise. In January 2016 the Minister for Infrastructure and Regional Development, Warren Truss, approved the installation of an ILS at Gold Coast Airport. Due to ground contamination that was found at the ILS location, it will not be able to be installed before the Gold Coast 2018 Commonwealth Games.

=== Terminal expansion ===
In 2016. a $260 million redevelopment commenced to expand the terminal across three levels, including four aerobridges, two new wide-body aircraft stands and improved ground transport facilities. Work began on the 30,000-square-metre (322,917 sq ft) southern terminal expansion in July 2019. Lendlease was appointed to deliver the project. These works provided capacity to handle up to 19 aircraft simultaneously.

By August 2022, much of the expansion work was complete and 400 volunteers participated in a mass trial at the Gold Coast Airport's new terminal on 30 August 2022.

== Lounges ==
Gold Coast Airport has two airline lounges: one, operated by Virgin Australia, has been operational since 30 May 2012, and is available to business class passengers, Virgin Australia lounge members, and Velocity Frequent Flyer Gold and Platinum members. A Qantas Club has been operational at the airport as of 3 December 2012, and is available to business class passengers, Qantas Club members, and Qantas Frequent Flyer Gold and Platinum members.

== Airlines and destinations ==
=== Passenger ===
The following airlines operate scheduled and in some cases chartered passenger flights from Gold Coast Airport. All passenger airlines operate flights from the main terminal (T1) with the exception of Eastern Air Services which operates from the General Aviation apron.

As of 2026, the Jetstar services between Gold Coast Airport and Perth Airport were the longest scheduled point to point domestic flights in Australia.

Airlines	Destinations
Air New Zealand	Auckland; Seasonal: Christchurch
Eastern Air Services	Lord Howe Island
Fiji Airways	Nadi
FlyPelican	Newcastle
Jetstar	Adelaide, Auckland, Avalon, Cairns, Canberra, Christchurch, Denpasar, Dunedin, Hamilton, Hobart, Melbourne, Newcastle, Perth, Queenstown, Sydney–Kingsford Smith, Sydney–Western, Wellington; Seasonal: Darwin
Qantas	Auckland, Melbourne, Sydney–Kingsford Smith
Virgin Australia	Adelaide, Canberra, Denpasar, Melbourne, Sydney–Kingsford Smith

=== Cargo ===
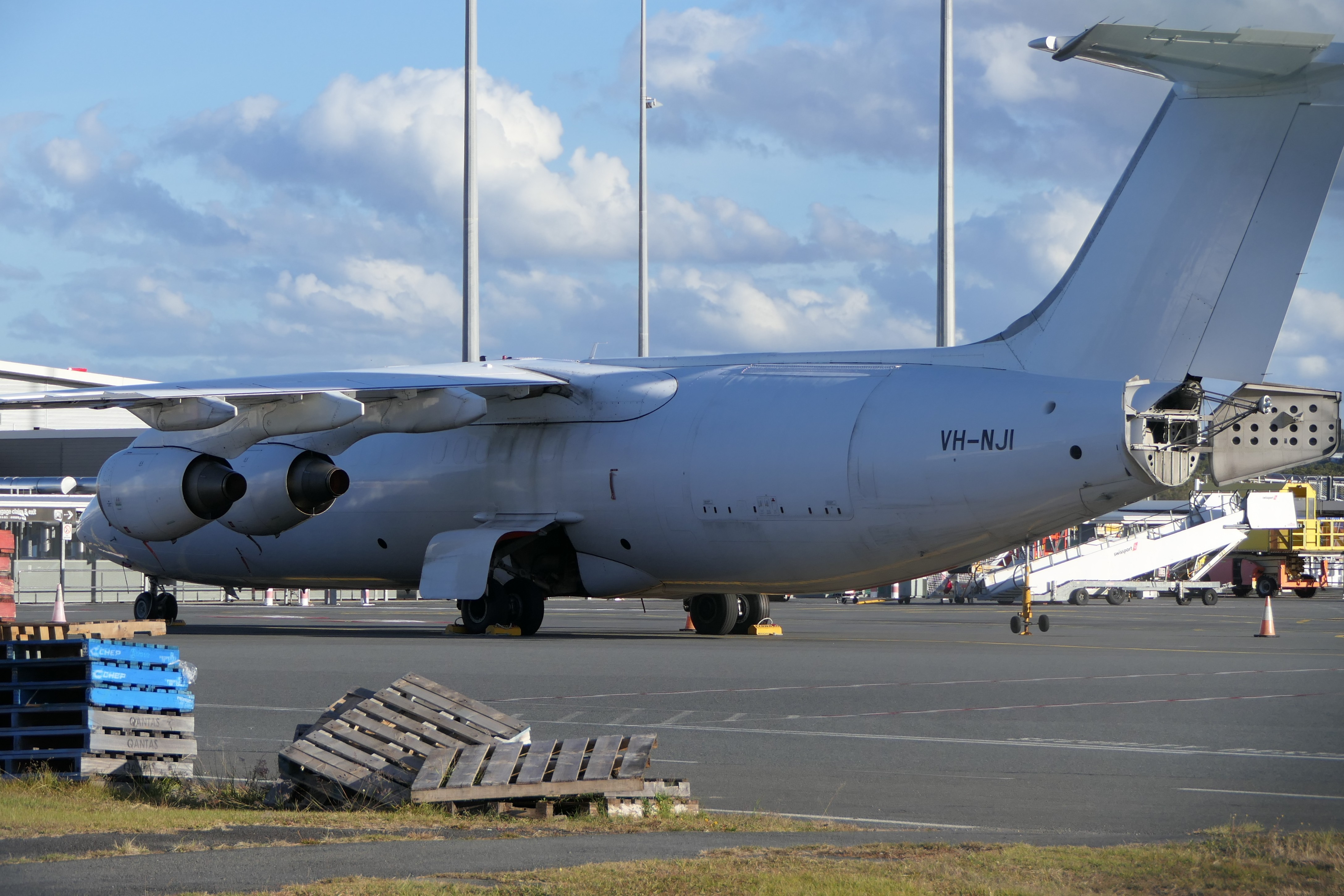
NJE BAe 146-300QT Parked at Gold Coast Airport after a Qantas Freight flight

The following airlines operate scheduled cargo flights from Gold Coast Airport.

Airlines	Destinations
Qantas Freight	Sydney–Kingsford Smith, Sydney–Western

Qantas Freight uses the cargo space of Jetstar aircraft to transport cargo domestically. It is also contracted for Jetstar international flights and Air New Zealand flights from the airport. It offers same day/overnight and standby services domestically airport to airport and airport to door from Gold Coast Airport. All cargo services operate from the Freight Terminal. Coast Cargo is a registered Cargo Terminal Operator (CTO) and currently handles Virgin Australia. It is also the agent for Toll Air Express.

== Statistics ==
=== Total annual passengers ===
Annual passenger statistics for Gold Coast Airport
Year	Domestic	International	Total	Change
1998	1,840,196	14,519	1,854,715	▼ –2.0%
1999	1,882,696	16,923	1,899,619	▲2.4%
2000	1,857,572	28,138	1,885,710	▼ –0.7%
2001	1,792,051	41,581	1,833,632	▼ –2.8%
2002	1,887,834	113,127	2,000,961	▲9.1%
2003	2,116,525	138,938	2,255,463	▲12.7%
2004	2,677,820	136,408	2,814,228	▲24.8%
2005	3,232,944	203,523	3,436,467	▲22.1%
2006	3,423,358	193,441	3,616,799	▲5.2%
2007	3,735,826	210,762	3,946,588	▲9.1%
2008	4,183,352	339,144	4,522,496	▲14.6%
2009	4,246,436	636,332	4,882,768	▲8.0%
2010	4,729,951	786,669	5,516,620	▲13.0%
2011	4,581,300	715,863	5,297,163	▼ –4.0%
2012	4,854,885	824,424	5,679,309	▲7.2%
2013	4,902,269	864,905	5,767,174	▲1.5%
2014	4,947,853	880,971	5,828,824	▲1.1%
2015	5,081,391	942,967	6,024,358	▲3.4%
2016	5,317,757	1,093,558	6,411,315	▲6.4%
2017	5,398,985	1,080,098	6,479,083	▲1.1%
2018	5,461,184	1,025,198	6,486,382	▲0.1%
2019	5,543,608	940,995	6,484,603	▼0.0%
2020	1,514,472	207,744	1,722,216	▼ –73.4%
2021	2,038,812	44,244	2,083,056	▲21.0%
2022	5,317,495	391,192	5,708,687	▲174.1%
2023	5,439,546	790,625	6,230,170	▲9.1%
2024	5,577,882	628,344	6,206,216	▼ –0.4%

=== Domestic ===
Busiest domestic routes – Gold Coast Airport (2024)
Rank	Airport	Passengers	% Change
1	Sydney	2,917,700	▲2.3%
2	Melbourne	2,462,200	▼9.9%
3	Adelaide	316,600	▲6.6%
4	Canberra	209,900	▼1.1%

=== International ===
Busiest international routes – Gold Coast Airport (year ending 31 December 2025)
Rank	Airport	Passengers	% Change
1	Auckland	330,800	▼0.6%
2	Christchurch	104,175	▲23.2%
3	Denpasar	101,169	▲38.5
4	Wellington	61,133	▲1.6%
5	Queenstown	59,533	▲10.7%
6	Hamilton	27,592	New entry
7	Dunedin	24,278	New entry

== Ground transportation ==
=== Road ===
The airport is located on the western side of the Gold Coast Highway in Bilinga, the terminal is 300 metres from the highway. The Gold Coast Highway passes through all the coastal suburbs of the city and is the most direct route to most of the major holiday destinations on the Gold Coast.

The Pacific Motorway (M1) interchange is 1.5 km (0.93 mi) south of the airport just over the NSW border in Tweed Heads West. It passes under the south end of the main runway and connects the city to Northern NSW, Gold Coast's western suburbs, and Brisbane CBD.

=== Public bus ===
All bus services are operated by Kinetic Gold Coast.

- 777 – Stockland Burleigh Heads via Burleigh Heads light rail station. This service is a limited stop, express service only. From Burleigh Heads, passengers can connect to other bus services and the G:link.
- 760 – Robina Town Centre via Varsity Lakes railway station and The Pines Shopping Centre (northbound), and Tweed Heads via Kirra and Coolangatta (southbound).

=== Airport shuttles ===
There are a number of private operators offering transfers between Gold Coast Airport and Brisbane. Scheduled transfers are available for arriving and departing passengers.

=== Train ===
The Gold Coast City Transport Strategy 2031 includes an extension of the G:link light rail to the airport, while the South East Queensland Infrastructure Plan and Program envisions extending the Gold Coast Line train line to the airport. As of 2025, neither have been approved to begin construction.

== Accidents and incidents ==
In March 1949, a Lockheed Lodestar aircraft became airborne at Bilinga airstrip for a flight to Archerfield Airport. Before reaching a height of 500 ft (150 m) it stalled and crashed. All 21 occupants died in the crash or the ensuing conflagration. It was Queensland's worst civil aviation accident.

== Awards ==
Gold Coast Airport received the "best airport award for customer experience" at the 2018 National Airport Industry Awards hosted by the Australian Airports Association in Brisbane.

== See also ==
- List of airports in Queensland
- Transport in Australia
