= Narrabri Airport =

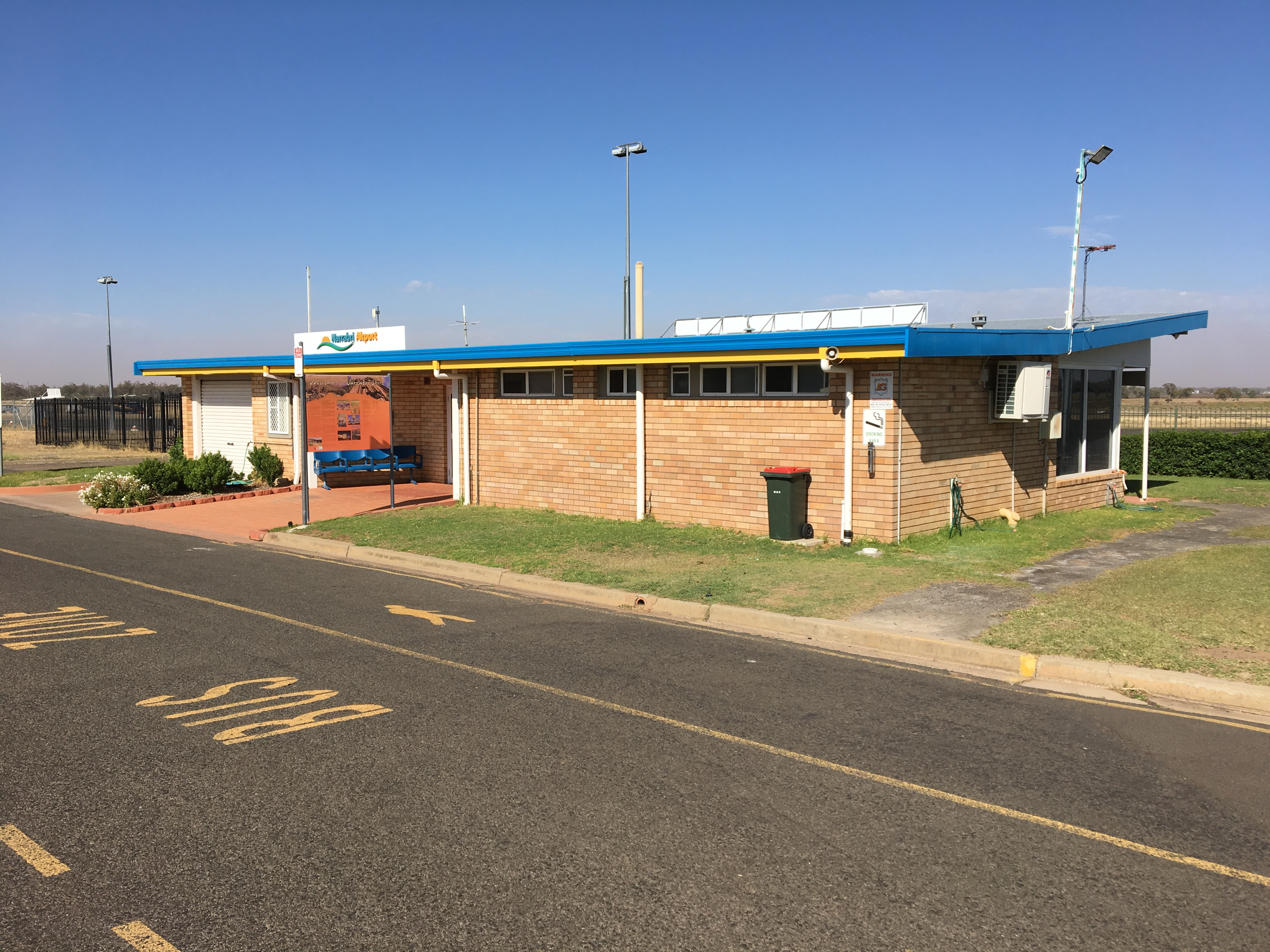
- Terminal at Narrabri Airport
- IATA: NAA; ICAO: YNBR

Summary
- Airport type: Public
- Operator: Narrabri Shire
- Location: Narrabri, New South Wales
- Elevation AMSL: 788 ft (240 m)
- Coordinates: 30°19′09″S 149°49′38″E
- Website: www.narrabri.nsw.gov.au

Map
- Location in New South Wales

Runways
Direction	Length		Surface
Direction	m	ft	Surface
18/36	1,524	5,000	Asphalt
09/27	1,213	3,980	Grass
- Sources: Australian AIP and aerodrome chart

Narrabri Airport (IATA: NAA, ICAO: YNBR) is an airport located 3 nautical miles (5.6 km; 3.5 mi) northeast of Narrabri, New South Wales, Australia.

== Airlines and destinations ==
Airlines	Destinations
FlyPelican	Newcastle, Sydney
Link Airways	Brisbane
