= Eastern Air Services =

Australian airline

- Founded: 2019
- Hubs: Port Macquarie Airport
- Fleet size: 9
- Destinations: 4
- Key people: Christian Corse (CEO)
- Website: www.easternairservices.com.au

Eastern Air Pty Ltd, operating as Eastern Air Services, is an Australian airline headquartered in Port Macquarie. The airline operates solely in New South Wales and Queensland with regularly scheduled flights to Lord Howe Island using its fleet of regional turboprop aircraft.

== Destinations ==
Eastern Air Services serves the following destinations:

- New South Wales
  - Lord Howe Island – Lord Howe Island Airport
  - Newcastle – Newcastle Airport
  - Port Macquarie – Port Macquarie Airport
- Queensland
  - Gold Coast – Gold Coast Airport

== Fleet ==
As of 1 February 2022, the Eastern Air Services fleet consists of the following aircraft:

| Aircraft | In service | Orders | Passengers | Notes |
|---|---|---|---|---|
| Super King Air 200 | 2 | — | 10 | |
| Baron 58 | 2 | — | 5 | |
| Piper PA-31 Chieftain | 1 | — | 5 | |
| Cessna 182 | 1 | — | 4 | |
| Cessna 182 Floatplane | 1 | — | 4 | |
| Piper PA-28 Warrior | 1 | — | 3 | |
| Cessna 172 | 1 | — | 3 | |
| Total | 10 | | | |

== Accidents and incidents ==
- On 13 May 2024, an Eastern Air Services Beechcraft Super King Air was safely brought down on Newcastle Airport without landing gear engaged. The flight consisted of one pilot and two passengers, none of whom were injured. The pilot had spent a number of hours circling the airport to burn fuel prior to attempting the landing.
