= Newcastle Airport (New South Wales) =

Airport serving Newcastle, Australia

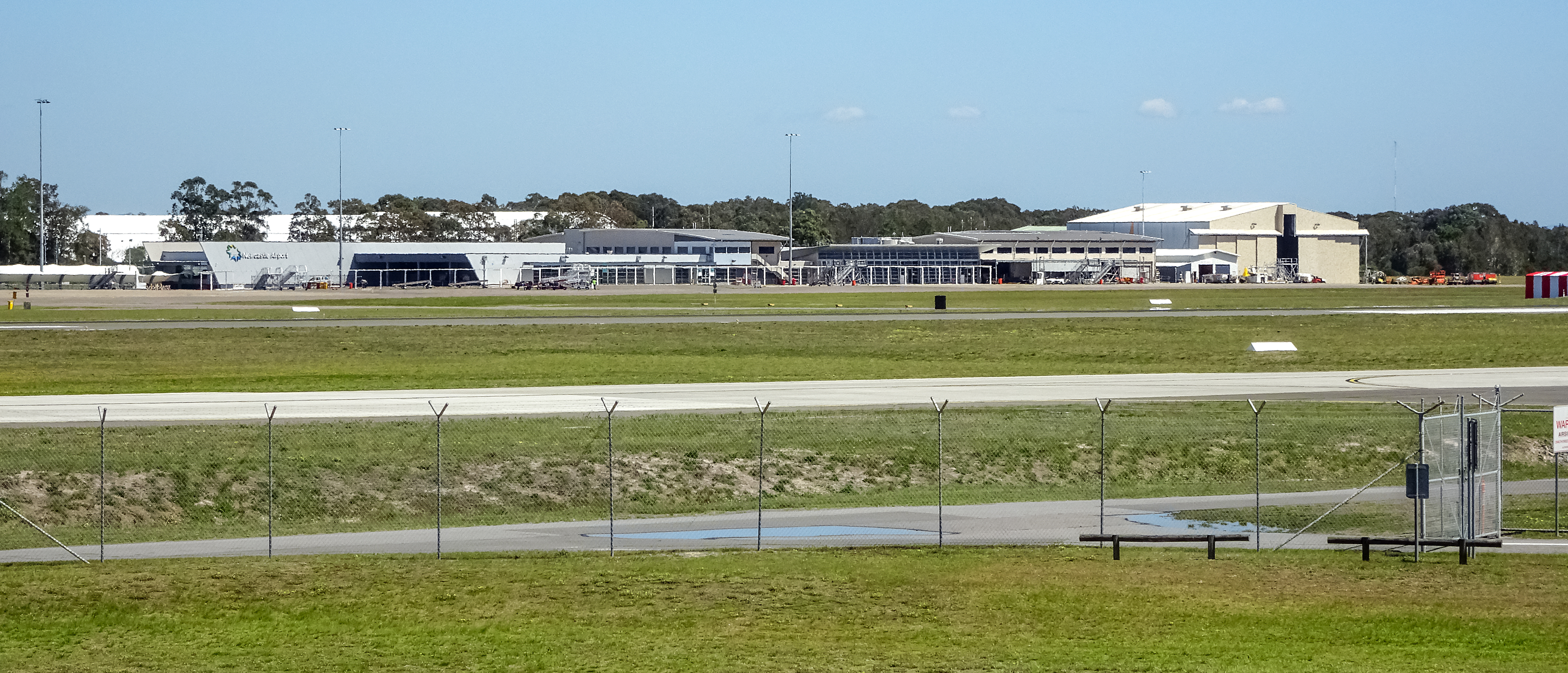
- IATA: NTL; ICAO: YWLM

Summary
- Airport type: Civil aviation
- Owner: Newcastle City Council; Port Stephens Council
- Operator: Newcastle Airport Pty Ltd
- Serves: Newcastle
- Location: Williamtown, New South Wales, Australia
- Hub for: FlyPelican
- Time zone: AEST (UTC+10:00)
  - Summer (DST): AEDT (UTC+11:00)
- Elevation AMSL: 31 ft (9.4 m)
- Coordinates: 32°47′42″S 151°50′04″E
- Website: Newcastle Airport

Maps
- Location within the Hunter-Central Coast Region Location within New South Wales Location within Australia Location within Oceania
- Interactive map of Newcastle Airport

Runways
Direction	Length		Surface
Direction	m	ft	Surface
12/30	3,058	10,033	Asphalt

Statistics (2024–25)
- Passengers: 1,183,708
- Aircraft movements: 12,468
- Sources: Australian AIP and aerodrome chart

Newcastle Airport (IATA: NTL, ICAO: YWLM), also known as Williamtown Airport, is an international airport in Williamtown, New South Wales. It is located 15 kilometres; 9.2 miles (8 NM) north of the Newcastle City Centre (27 km (17 mi) by road) in Port Stephens. It is the 13th busiest airport in Australia, handling over 1.25 million passengers in the year ended 30 June 2017, an increase of 6.6% on the previous year. The airport occupies a 28 ha (69-acre) site on the southern border of RAAF Base Williamtown.

== Overview ==
The airport is jointly owned by Newcastle City Council and Port Stephens Council, and managed by Newcastle Airport Pty Ltd. The airport and associated developments support over 3,300 jobs and contributed $1.19 billion to the economy of the lower Hunter Region in 2015.

The airport runway is owned by RAAF Base Williamtown. Even though this is a military airfield, civilian operations are permitted under an Operating Deed. Jetstar, Virgin Australia and QantasLink operate flights to Sydney, Melbourne, Brisbane, Gold Coast, Perth, Hobart, Cairns and Bali. FlyPelican and Link also operates flights to Canberra. The airport is leased from the federal government for civilian air travel until 2075.

The largest commercial aircraft currently operating at Newcastle Airport are the Boeing 737-800s of Virgin Australia. The civil apron and runway can handle aircraft up to the size of a Boeing 777.

== History ==
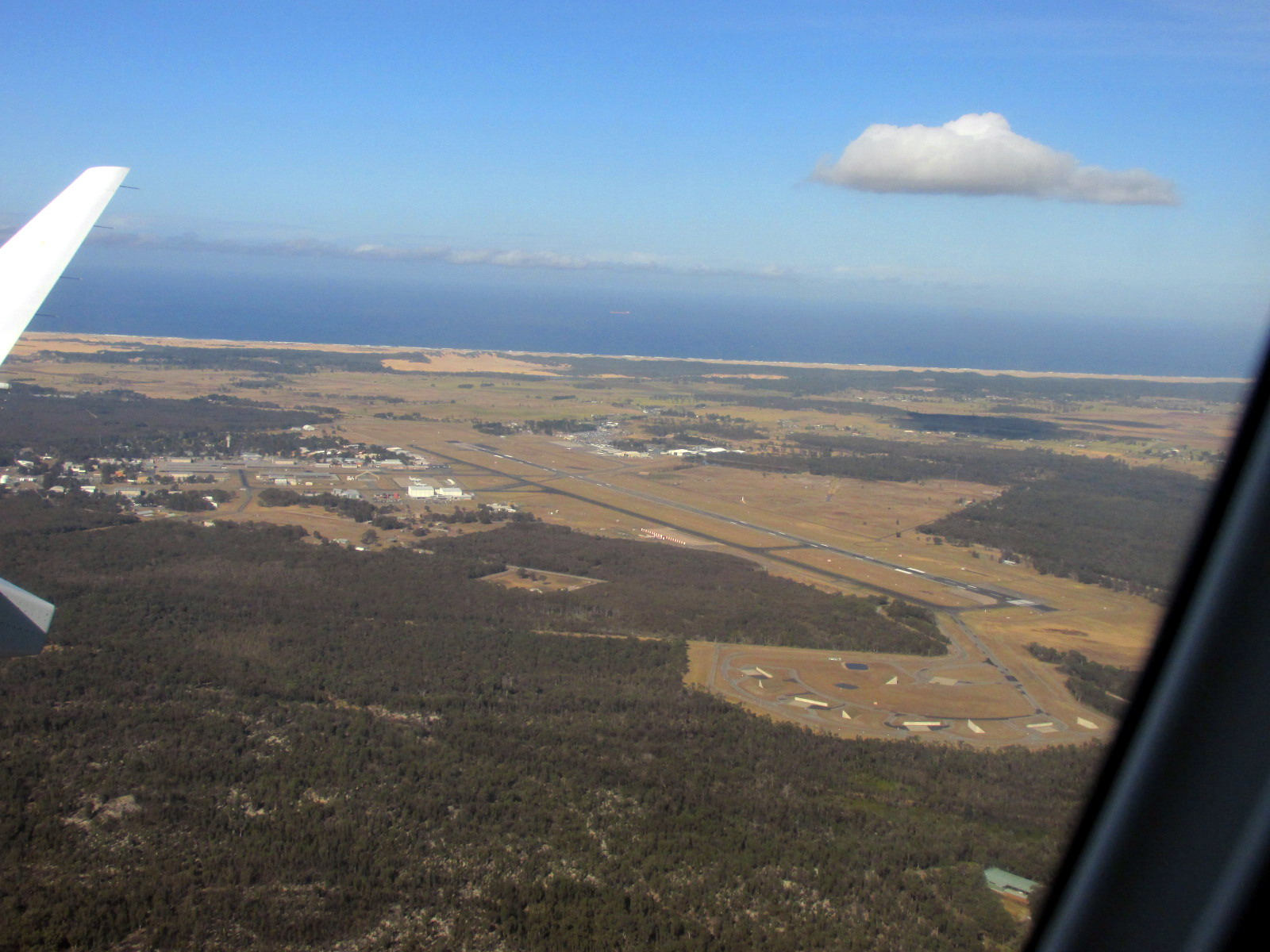
View from the air, 2014

Commercial operations began at Williamtown in 1947 when the federal government opened the existing Royal Australian Air Force (RAAF) airport to civil aviation. The airport remained under government control until 1990 when responsibility for its operation was handed over to Newcastle City Council and Port Stephens Council. The current operator, Newcastle Airport Pty Ltd, was formed by the two councils in 1993.

Scheduled services to the airport commenced in February 1948, with Trans Australia Airlines using Douglas DC-3 aircraft to service a Sydney–Newcastle–Brisbane route. A new passenger terminal was constructed in 1975. During the 1970s, Masling Airlines operated Cessna 402 aircraft on commuter flights between Newcastle and Sydney, and in 1980 with the acquisition of larger Embraer EMB 110 Bandeirante aircraft added a Newcastle – Canberra route. Passenger numbers increased during the 1980s with new airlines and routes serving the airport, including jet services utilising Fokker F28s of Air New South Wales and Ansett Boeing 737s.

Impulse Airlines established a base at the airport in the early 1990s, creating a maintenance facility. In 1994, Impulse added the first direct Newcastle – Melbourne flights to their network utilising British Aerospace Jetstream 41 aircraft. In 1996, owing largely Impulse's establishment of Newcastle as a regional hub, the terminal facilities were upgraded to handle growing passenger volumes. In 2000, Impulse acquired Boeing 717s and rebranded itself as a low-cost carrier. Newcastle Airport remained an integral part of the Impulse route network until the company was bought out by Qantas the following year. Following Qantas' acquisition of Impulse in 2001, the airport became the maintenance base for Jetstar's Airbus A320 fleet. The base also provides third party aircraft maintenance for the QantasLink's Boeing 717s.

In 1997, BAE Systems was awarded the contract for assembly and ongoing system support for the Hawk 127 Lead in Fighters for the RAAF. As part of the contract, a large facility was built adjacent to the passenger terminal at a cost of $15 million. Twenty-one of the thirty three aircraft were assembled at Williamtown, with the final deliveries taking place in October 2001. The BAE facility forms part of the Williamtown Aerospace Centre precinct.

In November 2006, a $8.25 million upgrade to the terminal facilities was completed. This development doubled the available floor space in the terminal building, enhanced security screening and added a third departure gate, two baggage carousels and a retail concourse with five stores. In the same year, Jetstar Engineering invested $29 million towards improvements to the former Impulse maintenance facilities to allow heavy maintenance on A320 family aircraft to be conducted at the airport, Aeropelican Air Services moved operations to Williamtown from Belmont Airport and Newcastle Airport was named Regional Airport of the Year by the Australian airports industry. Additional car parking and enhanced set down and pick up landside access was added in 2006 at a further cost of $2.7 million.

On 24 February 2015, Newcastle Airport's a 2,600 m^{2} (27,986 sq ft) extension was opened. The new expansion opened the airport to possible international services with a dedicated area for permanent customs, immigration and quarantine facilities. This expansion was the first stage of an $80 million redevelopment, with the existing terminal undergoing a full refurbishment. Redevelopment works for the adjacent RAAF base Williamtown, including a 650 m (2,133 ft) extension of the shared runway, began in January 2015.

== Facilities ==
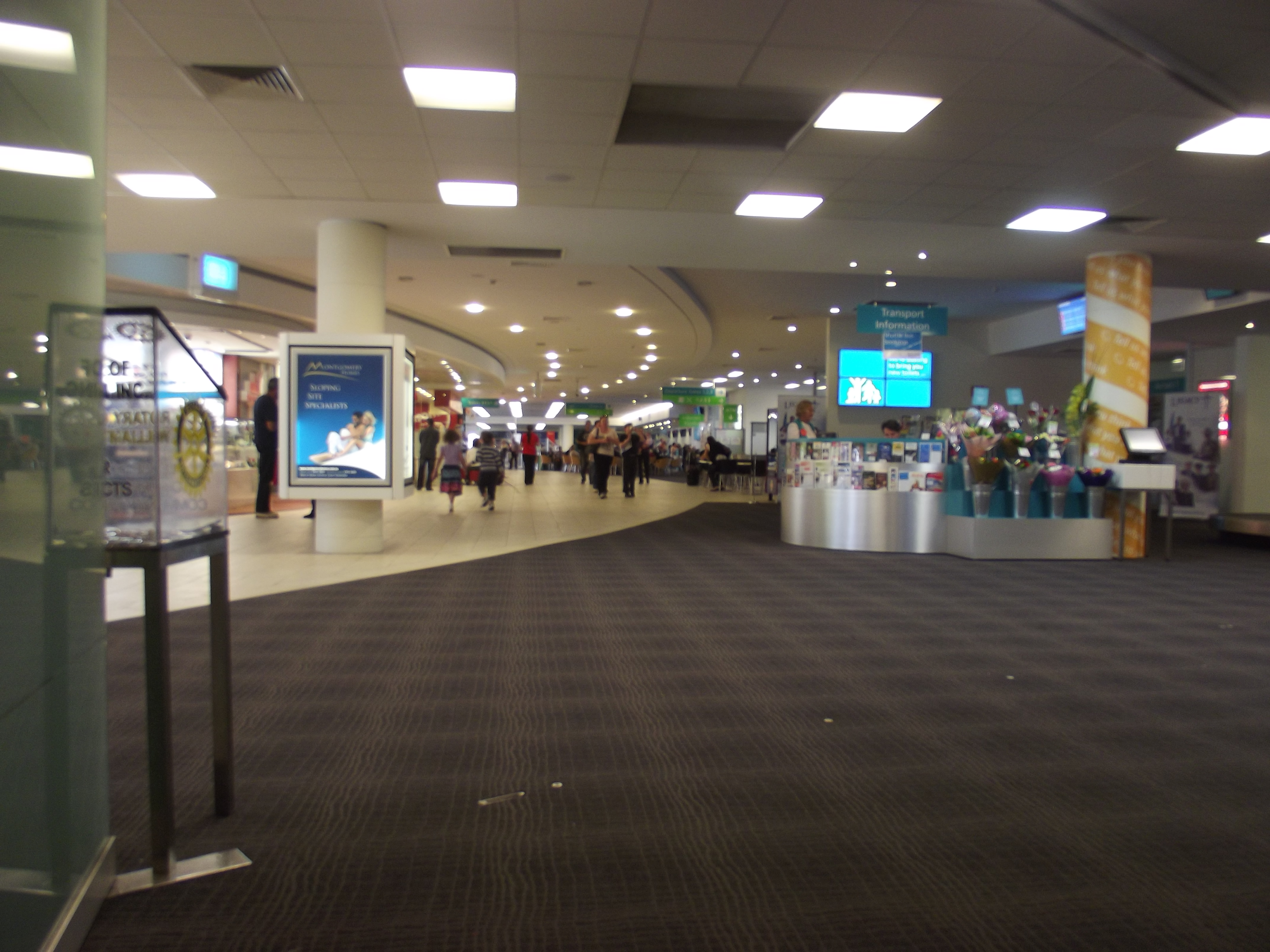
Passenger terminal

Newcastle Airport is surrounded by Class C Airspace and does not have a control tower. Newcastle Airport domestic traffic is controlled by the Williamtown RAAF base. Outside of RAAF operating times and Newcastle Airport operating curfew, pilots must co-ordinate movements using a Common Traffic Advisory Frequency (CTAF). The air traffic control service is provided by RAAF personnel.

Runway 12/30 has an available landing distance of 3,058 m (10,033 ft) with an asphalt surface. Runway 12 is equipped with a Category 1 Instrument landing system incorporating a high intensity approach lighting array to assist aircraft approaching the airport in poor weather conditions. Both ends of the runway are equipped with arrestor wires, although during civil operations, these are not deployed. Aircraft rescue and firefighting services are provided to the airport by the Department of Defence

The terminal building is serviced by a taxi rank. Rental car companies also operate from the precinct. Public internet access is provided. Newcastle Airport is served by bus services operated by Hunter Valley Buses and Port Stephens Coaches.

Previous renovations were completed in 2015 which consisted of refurbishing the existing terminal. A newsagent and specialty gift store was built, as well as six food and beverage outlets. Security screening was relocated to separate the check-in hall from the departures lounge.

== Expansion ==
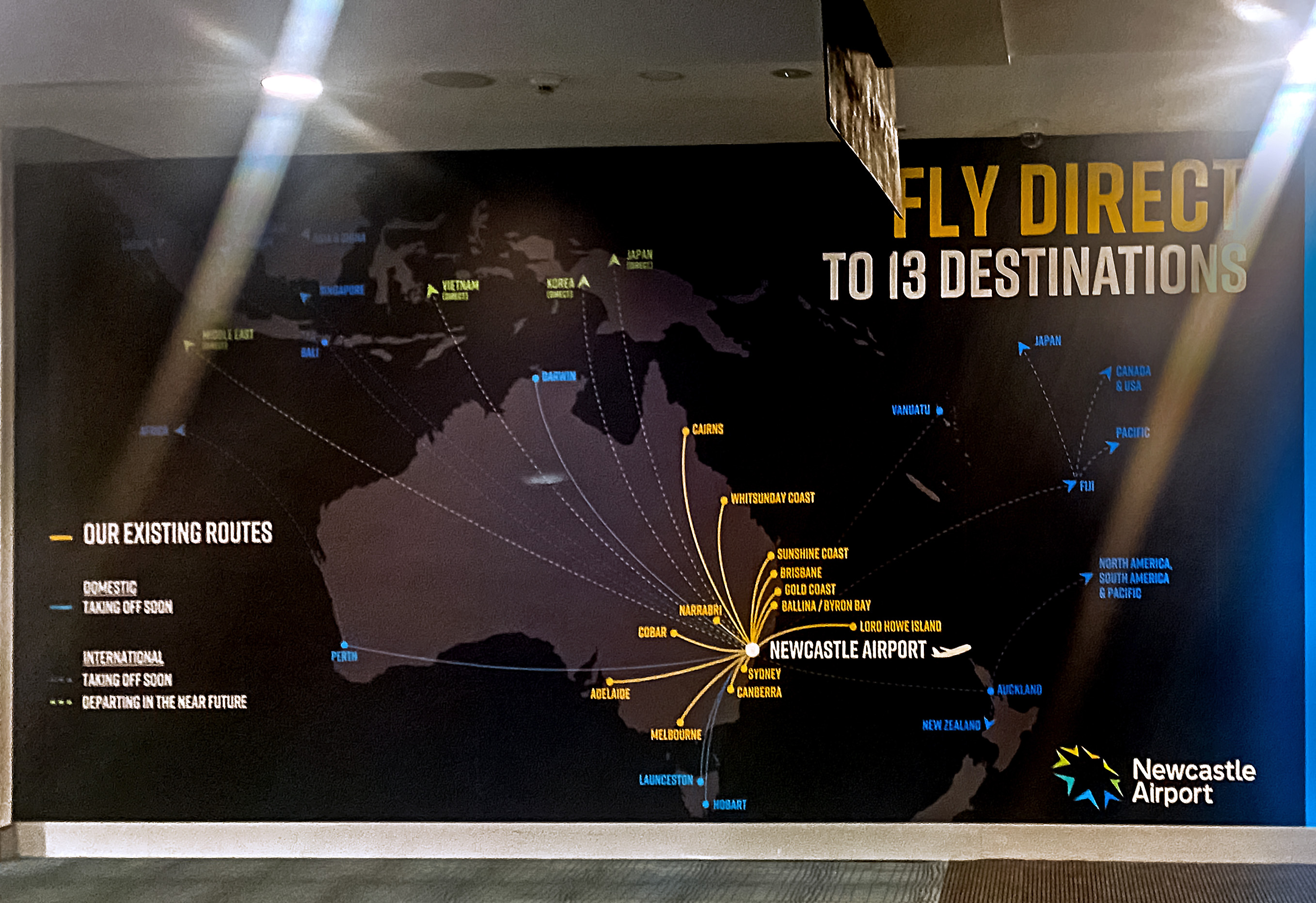
A map at Newcastle Airport showing the airport's planned further expansion, photographed in May 2024. The new terminal was opened in mid 2025.

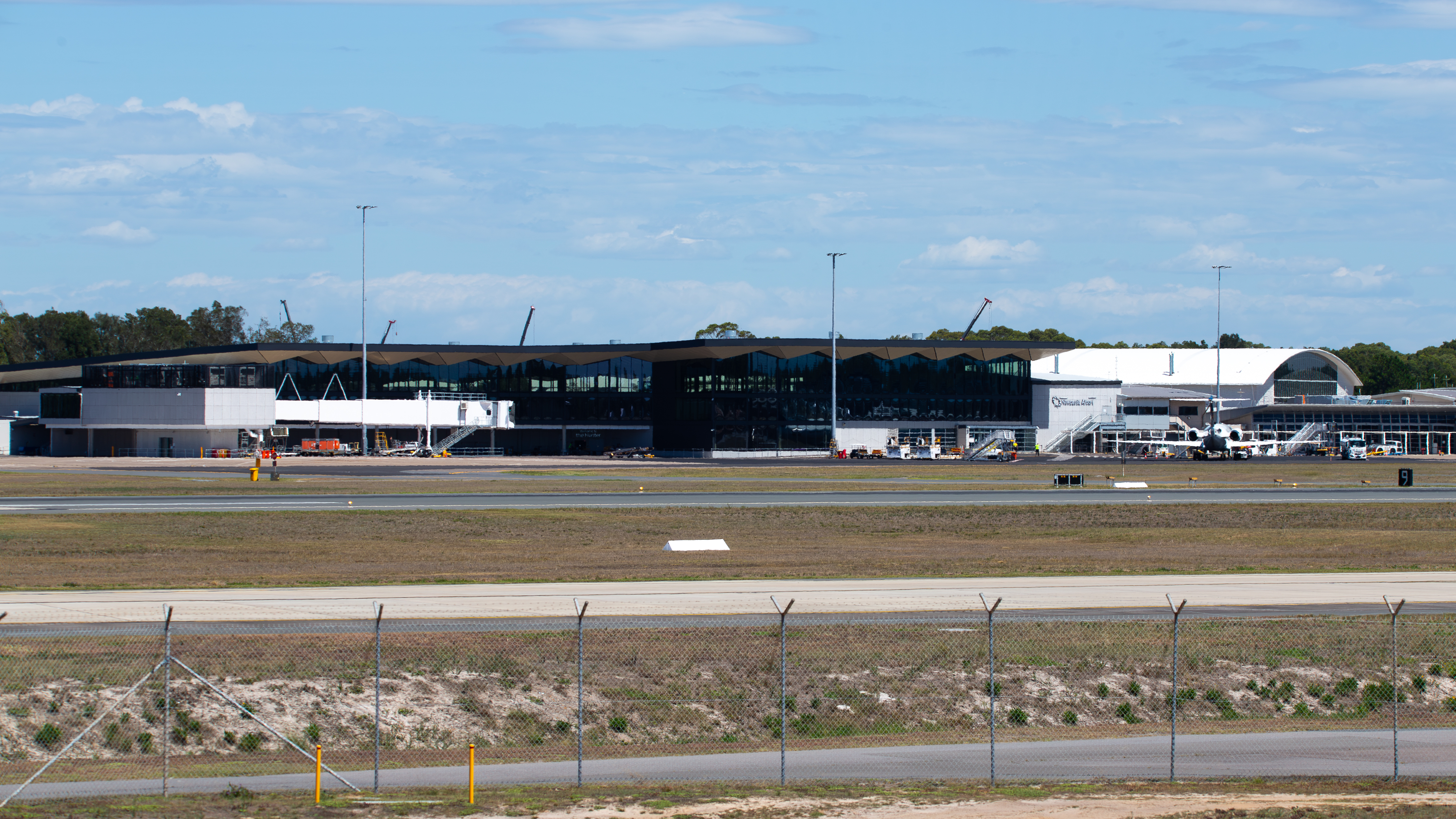
The new international terminal building, pictured in 2026.

In May 2021, the Australian Government announced a $55 million upgrade to the international terminal at Newcastle Airport, The expansion will make the terminal able of facilitating large aircraft capable of flying to Asia, the United States and the Middle East.

On 14 April 2022, then-Deputy Prime Minister Barnaby Joyce announced that the federal Morrison government would fund $55 million for the international and domestic terminal upgrades for the airport. Even with the election of the Albanese government in May 2022, the upgrades are still supported by the federal government. The international terminal will be completed by early 2025. (Subject to Delays)

In July 2022, Newcastle Airport announced its interest to begin direct flights to Singapore.

In April 2023, the Commonwealth Bank announced its support for the upgrades.

When completed, the upgrade will have new retail and duty-free stores and possibly airport lounges. Newcastle Airport intends to have direct flights to Malaysia, the Pacific Islands, New Zealand, Singapore, as well as direct domestic flights to destinations such as Hobart, Launceston and Perth. It intends to restart flights to Auckland as well.

On 21 October 2025, Jetstar launched non-stop flight to Denpasar using Airbus A321LR aircraft. This marks the establishment of scheduled international flights served from Newcastle Airport after its designation as an international airport. In March 2026, Jetstar extended its Denpasar services to Singapore.

== Airlines and destinations ==
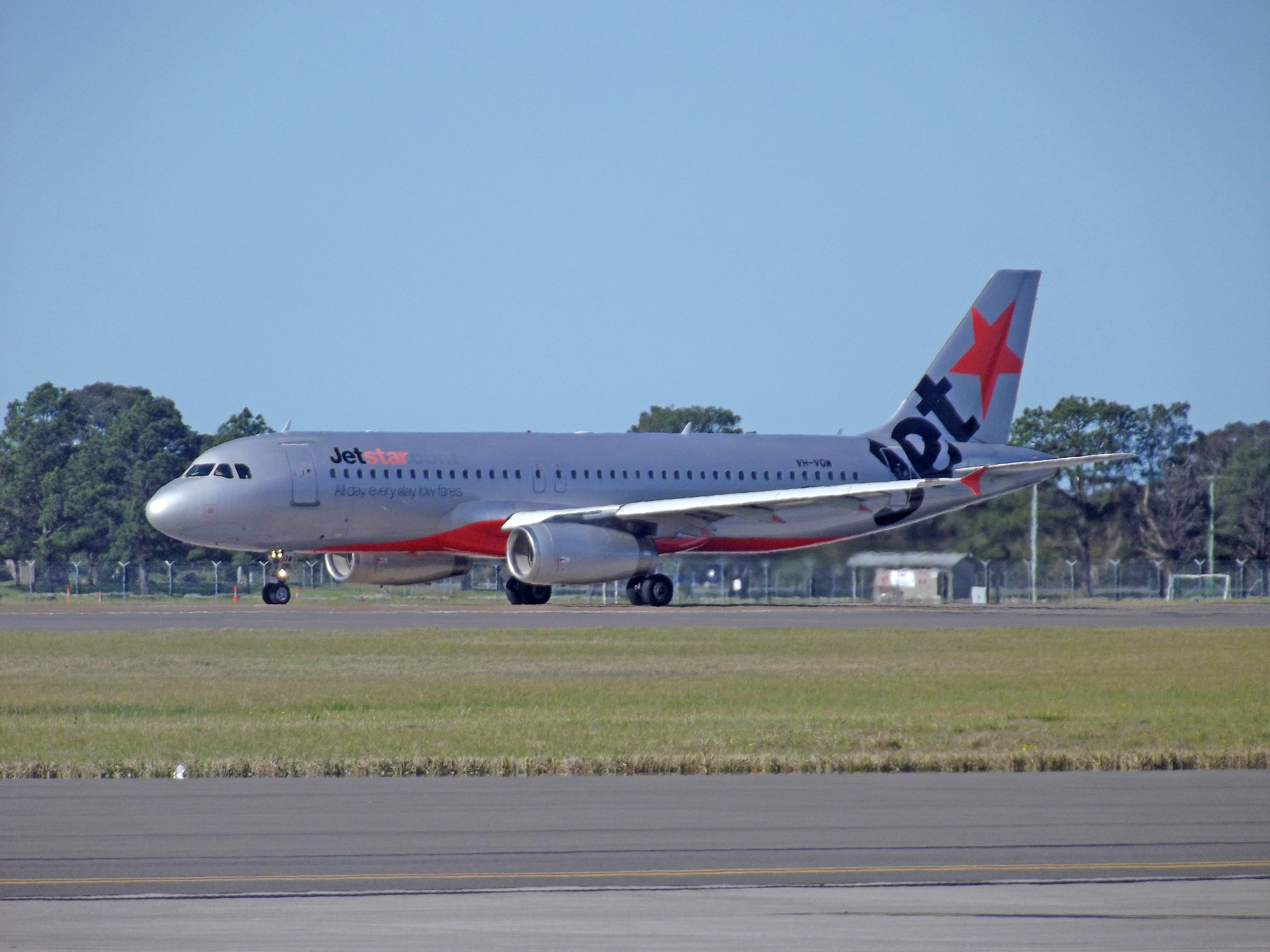
Jetstar Airbus A320-200

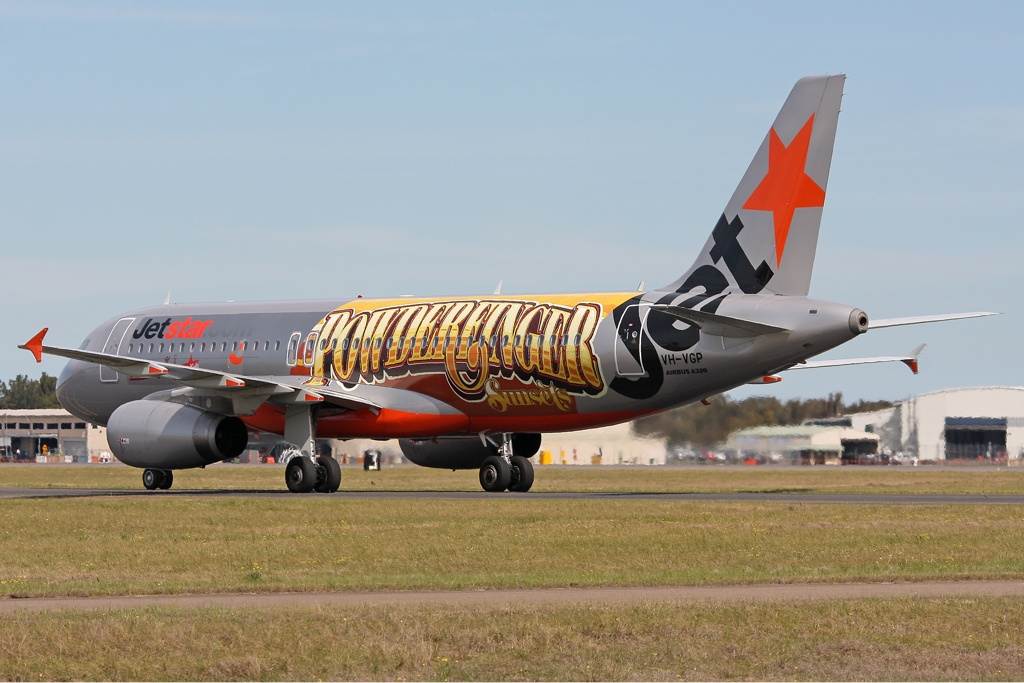
Jetstar Airbus A320-200 in Powderfinger livery at Newcastle Airport

Airlines	Destinations
Eastern Air Services	Lord Howe Island
FlyPelican	Canberra, Gold Coast, Narrabri, Sydney
Jetstar	Brisbane, Denpasar, Gold Coast, Melbourne, Singapore; Seasonal: Hobart
Link Airways	Canberra
QantasLink	Adelaide, Brisbane, Melbourne, Perth
Virgin Australia	Brisbane, Melbourne

== Operations ==
Annual passenger statistics for Newcastle (Williamtown)
Year	Passenger numbers
2000–01	240,428
2001–02	211,214
2002–03	198,221
2003–04	302,404
2004–05	639,917
2005–06	816,651
2006–07	958,087
2007–08	1,065,972
2008–09	1,172,938
2009–10	1,127,392
2010–11	1,211,302
2011–12	1,191,944
2012–13	1,206,517
2013–14	1,168,543
2014–15	1,139,699
2015–16	1,151,262
2016–17	1,257,210
2017–18	1,272,634
2018–19	1,277,473
2019–20	930,415
2020-21	480,142
2021-22	574,060
2022-23	1,090,166
2023-24	1,201,167
2024-25	1,183,708

Busiest domestic routes into and out of Newcastle Airport (2015)
Rank	Airport	Passengers	% change	Carriers
1	Brisbane, Queensland	543,738	▼7.3	Virgin Australia, Jetstar, QantasLink
2	Melbourne, Victoria	443,026	▲1.3	Virgin Australia, Jetstar

== Accidents and incidents ==
- On 2 October 1994, a Rockwell Commander 690B operating for Seaview Air with flight number CD111 departed Newcastle (Williamtown) Airport for Lord Howe Island. The aircraft carried a pilot and 8 passengers. Radio contact with the aircraft was lost during the flight, and a search and rescue operation was declared. Two days later, debris was found floating on the sea near the aircraft's last known position. The Bureau of Air Safety Investigation (predecessor of Australian Transport Safety Bureau) report into the incident uncovered alarming information about how the flight was conducted. The aircraft was 220 kg over maximum takeoff weight, the pilot did not possess a current medical certificate required to operate the aircraft and the company did not have the pre-requisite licences to operate regular public transport flights between Newcastle and Lord Howe Island. The accident is considered not to have been survivable by anyone on board the aircraft. The circumstances surrounding the accident led to a commission of inquiry (Note: Officially titled, Commission of Inquiry into the Relations Between the CAA and Seaview Air) into the Civil Aviation Safety Authority's handling of Seaview Air's operations.
- On 13 May 2024, a Beechcraft Super King Air from Eastern Air Services performed a successful emergency landing at Newcastle Airport without landing gear engaged. The flight consisted of one pilot and two passengers, none of which were injured. The pilot has spent a number of hours circling the airport to burn fuel prior to attempting the landing.
