= Lord Howe Island Board =

Agency overview
- Formed: 12 February 1913 (Board of Control); 23 April 1954 (Board)
- Preceding Agency: Lord Howe Island Board of Control
- Jurisdiction: Lord Howe Island
- Minister responsible: Penny Sharpe, Minister for Environment and Heritage
- Agency executive: Atticus Fleming AM, Chairperson; Chief Executive Officer
- Parent department: Department of Planning and Environment
- Key documents: Lord Howe Island Act, 1953; Lord Howe Island Regulation 2014
- Website: Lord Howe Island Board

The Lord Howe Island Board is a NSW Statutory Authority established under the Lord Howe Island Act, 1953, to administer Lord Howe Island, an unincorporated island territory within the jurisdiction of the State of New South Wales, Australia, in the Tasman Sea between Australia and New Zealand. It comprises seven members, of whom four are directly elected by the island population, and reports directly to the New South Wales Minister for Environment and Heritage, and is responsible for the care, control and management of the island.

== Responsibilities ==
Its duties include the:

- protection of World Heritage values
- control of development
- administration of Crown Land, including the island’s protected area, the Permanent Park Preserve
- provision of community services and infrastructure
- delivery of sustainable tourism

The Lord Howe Island Regulation 2014 give effect to the LHI Act by establishing measures for administration including: Board elections, licensing of businesses, environment protection, sale and consumption of alcohol, and placed the board under the provisions of the Local Government Act 1993.

== Composition ==
Since 2004 the Board has comprised seven members, four of whom are elected from the islander community, thus giving the approximately 350 permanent residents a high level of autonomy. The remaining three members (including the Chairperson) are appointed by the Minister of whom:

- One appointee must represent the interests of business and tourism.
- One appointee must represent the interests of conservation.
- One appointee must be an employee of the Department of Planning and Environment.

The full Board meets quarterly on the island while the day-to-day affairs of the island are managed by the Board’s administration which operates in a similar manner to a local government authority in New South Wales, with a permanent staff of 50 led by a Chief Executive Officer.

== Legislative history ==
The Board dates back to 1913, when the Sydney-based Lord Howe Island Board of Control was formed to replace a single magistrate appointed by the NSW Government. The Lord Howe Island Board of Control comprised three members appointed by the Chief Secretary of New South Wales, mostly to regulate the palm seed industry, but also administering the affairs of the island from Sydney until the present Lord Howe Island Board was set up in 1954.

The Lord Howe Island Board commenced operations from 23 April 1954 and comprised five members appointed by the Chief Secretary. The members included the Under Secretary of the Chief Secretary's Department (as Chairman), the responsible Member of Parliament (the Member of the Legislative Assembly for King until 1973), a nominee of the Secretary for Lands (in practice the Under Secretary of the Department of Lands), and two appointed members from the Lord Howe Island Advisory Committee.

In 1981, the Lord Howe Island Amendment Act gave islanders the administrative power of three elected members on a five-member board. Under the Lord Howe Island Amendment Act, 2004, the board now comprises seven members, four of whom are elected from the islander community.

== Chairs ==
#	Chairman/Chairperson	Term	Time in office	Notes
Lord Howe Island Board of Control
1	Frederick Albert Coghlan	12 February 1913 – 9 June 1914	1 year, 117 days	
2	George Hulton Smyth King	9 June 1914 – 24 August 1917	3 years, 76 days	
3	John Fitzpatrick	24 August 1917 – 7 August 1932	14 years, 349 days	
4	Edward Burns Harkness CMG	28 October 1932 – 24 November 1938	6 years, 27 days	
5	Stanley Llewellyn Anderson	25 November 1938 – 16 July 1949	10 years, 234 days	
6	Cecil Jones Buttsworth	16 July 1949 – 23 April 1954	4 years, 281 days	
Lord Howe Island Board
1	Cecil Jones Buttsworth OBE	23 April 1954 – 30 March 1958	3 years, 341 days	
2	Arthur Gerald Kingsmill ISO	31 March 1958 – 29 January 1971	12 years, 304 days	
3	John Brettell Holliday AM	30 January 1971 – 12 August 1975	4 years, 194 days	
4	Rodney Ernest Murdoch	12 August 1975 – 19 March 1982	6 years, 219 days	
5	Bruce Richard Davies	19 March 1982 – 24 August 1983	1 year, 158 days	
6	Gerald Gleeson AC	24 August 1983 – 5 September 1986	3 years, 12 days	
7	Frederick Arnold Elliott	12 September 1986 – 1989		
8	John Frederick Whitehouse	1989 – 1990		
9	Vivienne Ingram	1990 – 1999		
10	John O'Gorman	February 1999 – 31 March 2005		
11	Anthony Fleming	1 April 2005 – 3 December 2007	2 years, 246 days	
–	Barney Nichols (acting)	3 December 2007 – 3 March 2008		
12	Robert Pallin	3 March 2008 – March 2008		
13	Alistair Henchman	April 2008 – July 2012		
–	Barney Nichols (acting)	July 2012 – 19 November 2012		
14	Bob Conroy	19 November 2012 – 11 August 2013	265 days	
15	Chris Eccles	12 August 2013 – 25 June 2014	317 days	
–	Barney Nichols (acting)	25 June 2014 – 26 June 2015	1 year, 1 day	
16	Phil Minns	26 June 2015 – 27 November 2015	154 days	
17	Sonja Stewart	28 November 2015 – 15 July 2019	3 years, 229 days	
18	Anissa Levy	15 July 2019 – 1 January 2021	1 year, 170 days	
19	Atticus Fleming AM	1 January 2021 – date	5 years, 219 days	
