= Ansett Australia =

Australian airline (1936–2002)

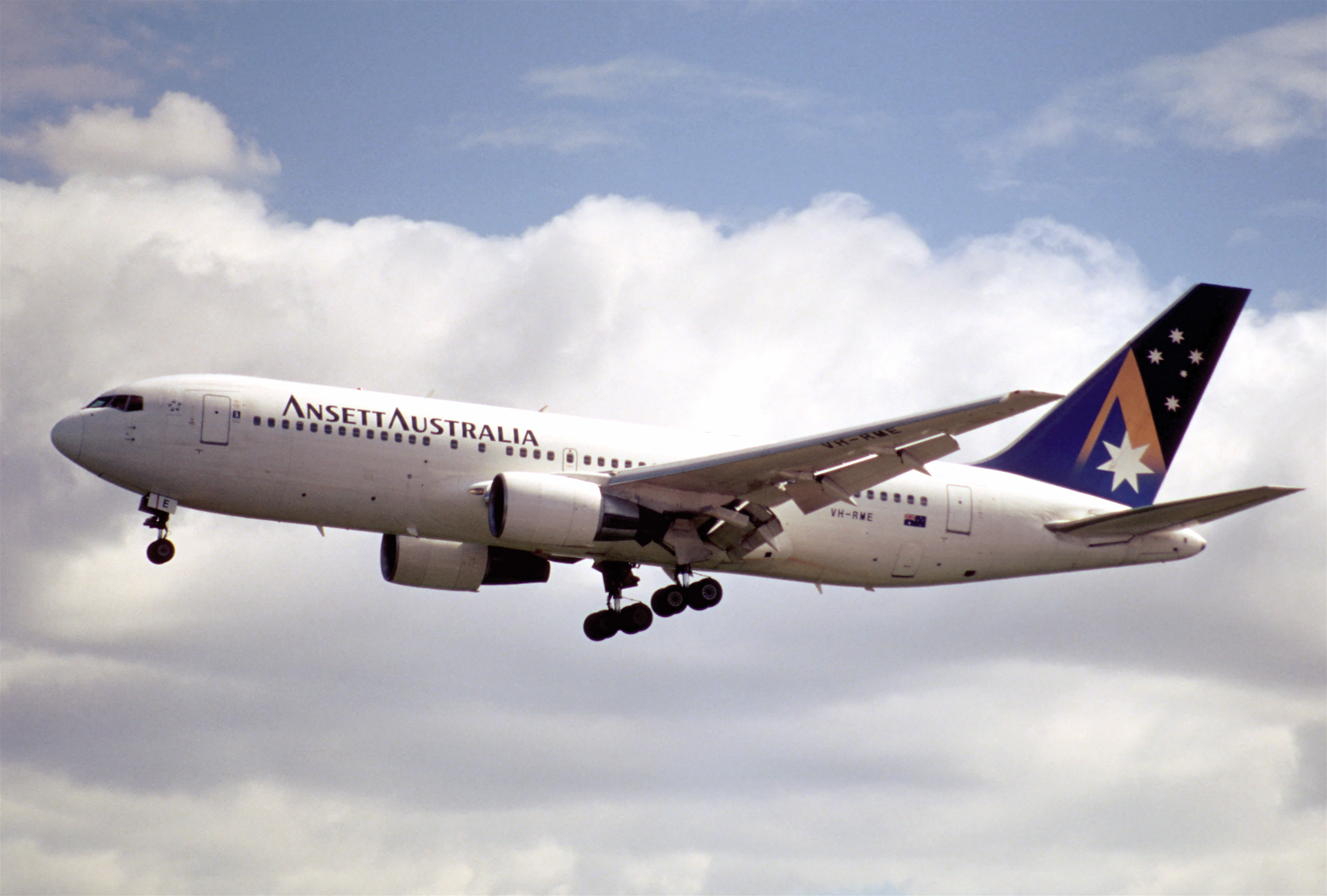
- Ansett Australia Boeing 767-200
IATA	ICAO	Call sign
AN	AAA	ANSETT
- Founded: Mark I: 17 February 1936; 90 years ago (as Ansett Airways); Mark II: 29 September 2001; 25 years ago
- Ceased operations: Mark I: 13 September 2001; 25 years ago; Mark II: 4 March 2002; 24 years ago
- Hubs: Melbourne; Sydney
- Secondary hubs: Brisbane; Perth
- Focus cities: Adelaide; Cairns; Canberra; Hobart
- Frequent-flyer program: Global Rewards; Golden Wing Club
- Alliance: Star Alliance (1999–2001)
- Subsidiaries: Ansett Worldwide Aviation Services (1985–2000); Kendell Airlines (1990–2001); Hazelton Airlines (2001); Aeropelican (1980–2001); Skywest Airlines (1983–2001); East-West Airlines (1987–1993); Ansett New Zealand (1987–1996)
- Fleet size: 133
- Parent company: Air New Zealand (2000–2001)
- Headquarters: Melbourne, Victoria, Australia
- Key people: Peter Abeles (former owner & CEO)
- Founder: Reg Ansett
- Employees: Over 15,000
- Website: Website not available

Ansett Australia, originally Ansett Airways, was a major Australian airline group based in Melbourne, Victoria. The company operated domestically within Australia, and from the 1990s, to destinations in Asia. Air New Zealand bought half of the company in 1996 and the remainder in 2000. As Ansett's losses mounted in 2001, the New Zealand government was reluctant to allow Singapore Airlines to increase its stake in Air New Zealand and recapitalise the group, while the Australian government favoured a rival proposal from Qantas. Following 65 years of operation, the airline was placed into voluntary administration on 12 September 2001 and grounded two days later, with the loss of about 16,000 jobs. A scaled-back operation resumed later that month while the administrators sought a buyer, but it ceased on 4 March 2002 after a proposed sale to a consortium led by Lindsay Fox and Solomon Lew fell through, and the group's remaining assets were then sold under a deed of company arrangement. Ansett's last flight touched down on 5 March 2002. Qantas took over most of Ansett's share of the domestic market.

== History ==
=== Beginning ===
The company was founded by Reginald "Reg" Ansett in 1935 as Ansett Airways Pty Ltd. This was an offshoot of his road transport business, which had become so successful it was threatening the freight and passenger revenue of Victorian Railways. This led the state government to legislate to put private road transport operators out of business. Reg Ansett countered by establishing an airline, as aviation was under control of the federal government and beyond the reach of the state government.

Ansett's first route between Hamilton and Melbourne operated by a Fokker Universal monoplane commenced on 17 February 1936. The rapid success of the airline led Ansett to float the business in 1937. As the route network expanded, Ansett Airways imported Lockheed Electra aircraft. During World War II, Ansett opted to suspend all scheduled services, except the Hamilton service, in favour of more lucrative work for the United States Army Air Forces. After the war, Ansett battled to re-establish his domestic routes using war-surplus Douglas DC-3s, converted from C-47s and the remaining Lockheed Electras.

At this time, the Australian domestic airline travel sector was dominated by Australian National Airways (ANA), established in 1936 by a consortium of British-financed Australian shipowners. The Chifley federal government was determined to establish a state-owned airline to operate all domestic and international services. It was eventually thwarted in this aim by the High Court of Australia, so it established Trans-Australia Airlines (TAA) to operate in competition with ANA.

=== Towards a duopoly ===
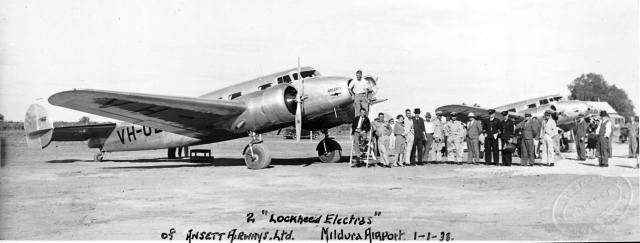
Two Ansett Lockheed Model 10 Electra aircraft at Mildura in 1938

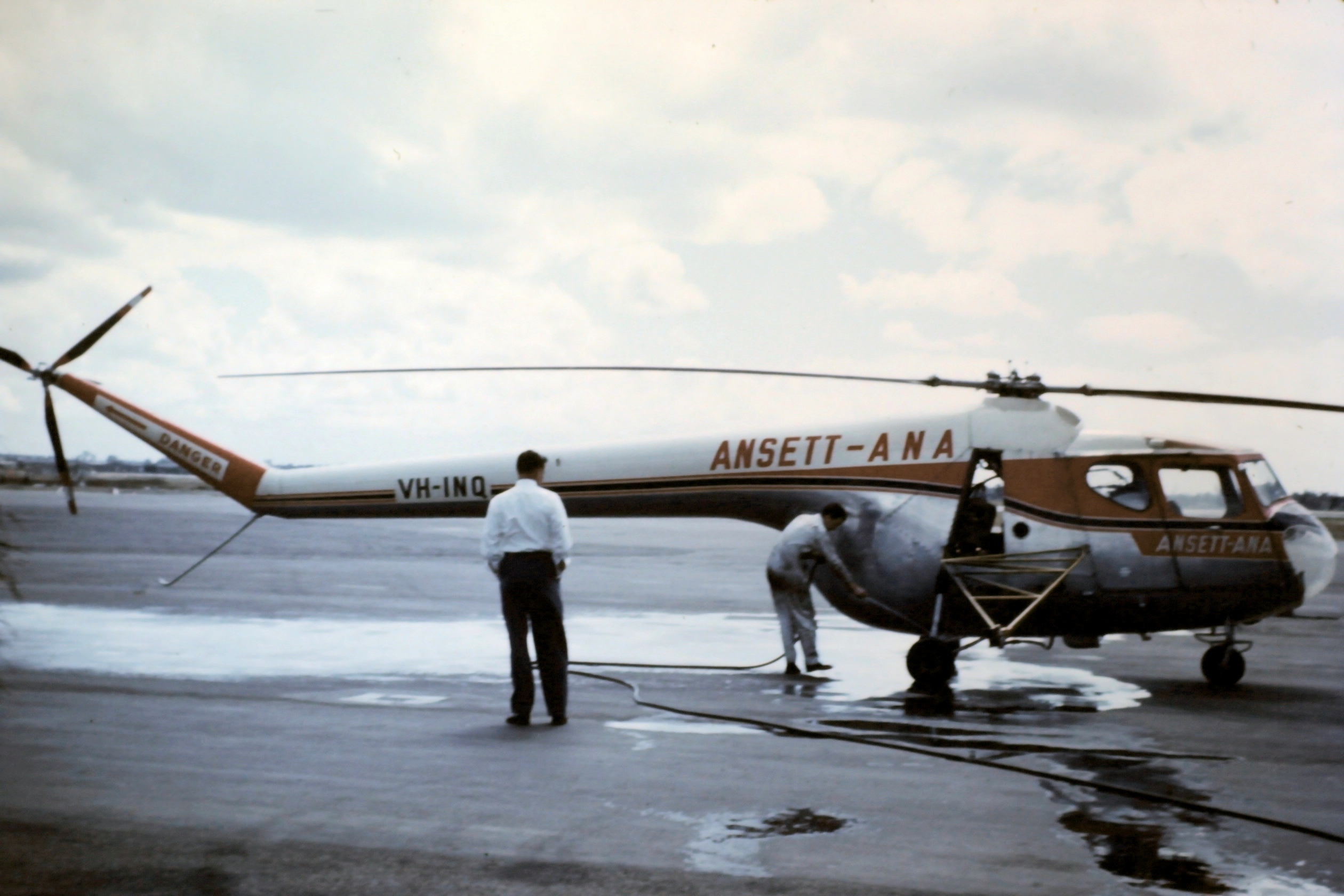
Bristol 171 Sycamore in Ansett-ANA service in Australia around 1960: Note possible spraying arm attachments.

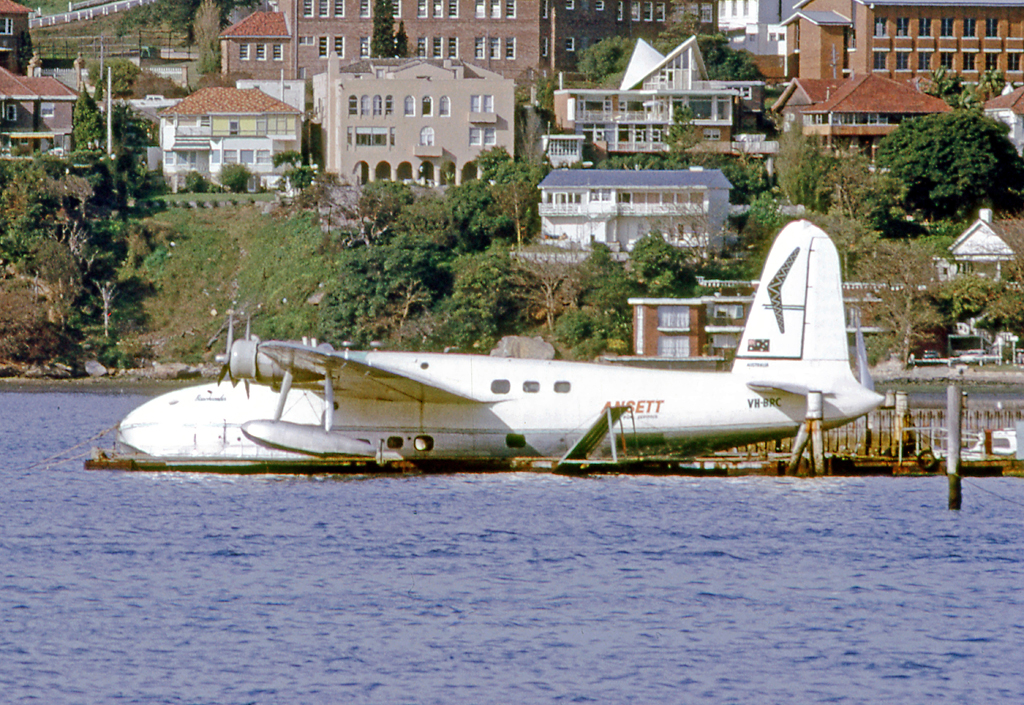
Short S.25 Sandringham of Ansett Flying Boat Services at Rose Bay Water Airport in Sydney in October 1970 when operating the schedule to Lord Howe Island

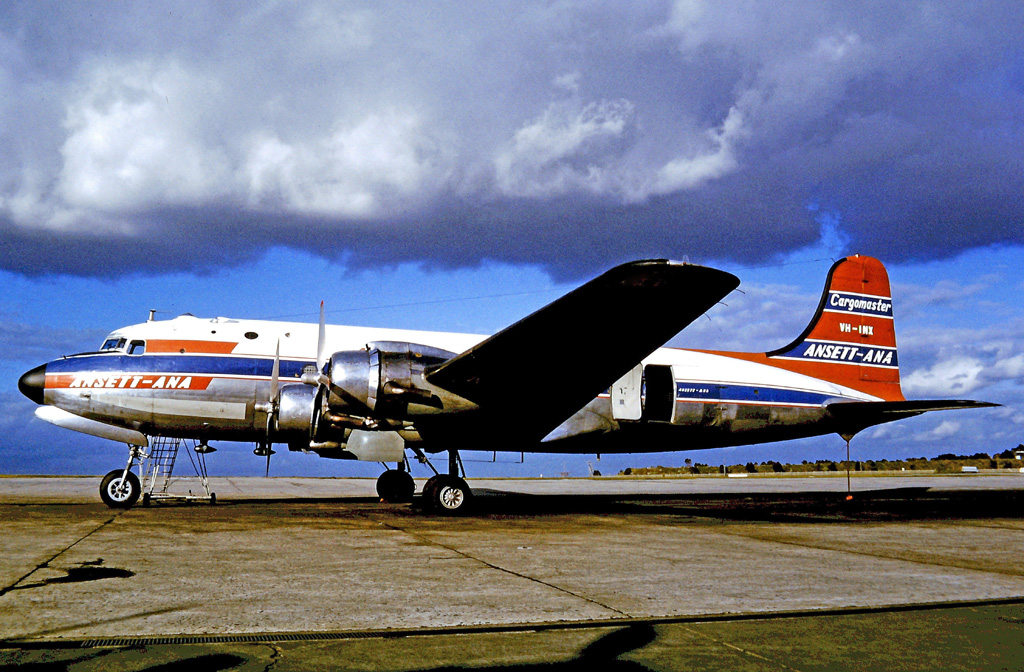
Ansett Douglas DC-4 (a civilianised C-54 Skymaster transport) Cargomaster freighter at Essendon Airport in 1970, wearing the Braniff-inspired Ansett-ANA "Golden Jet" colours

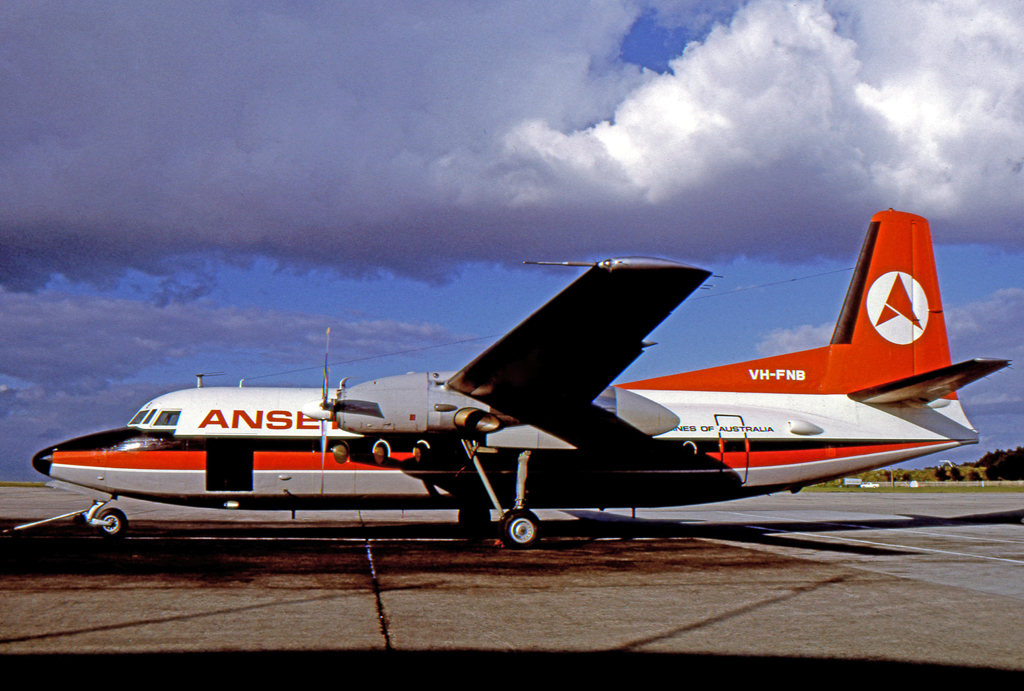
Fokker F27 Friendship of Ansett Airlines in 1970

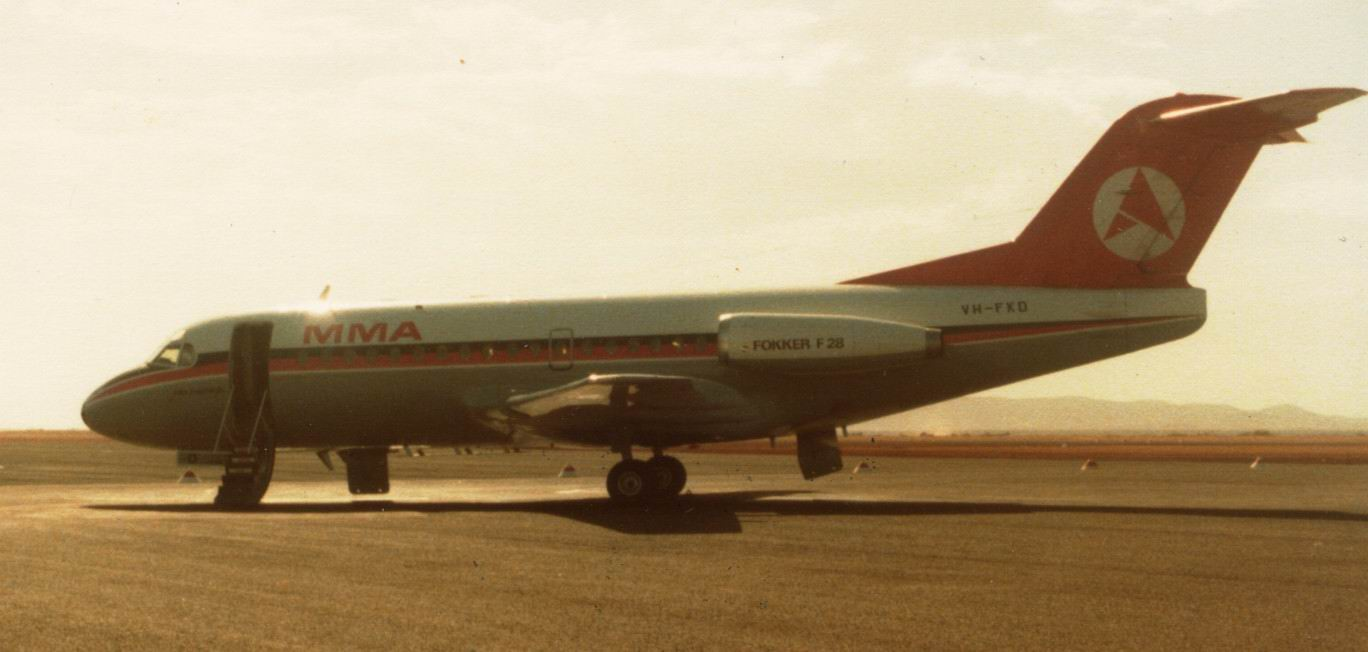
MacRobertson Miller Airlines Fokker F28 Fellowship in hybrid Ansett livery with MMA titles at Karratha Airport in 1971

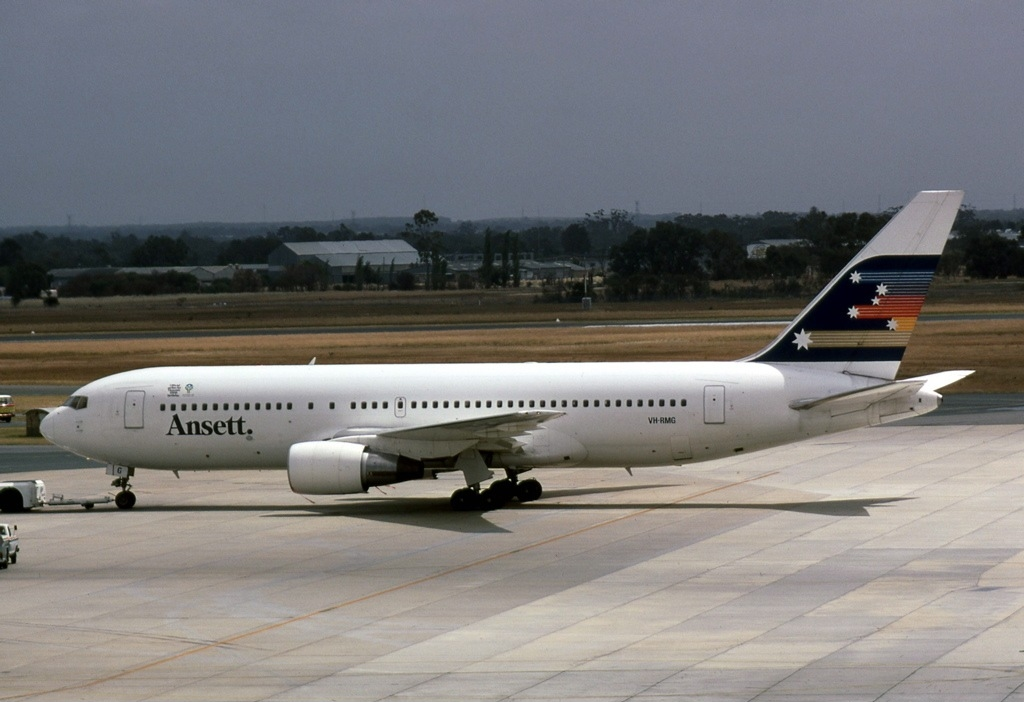
Ansett Boeing 767 in the 'Southern Cross' livery at Perth in 1985

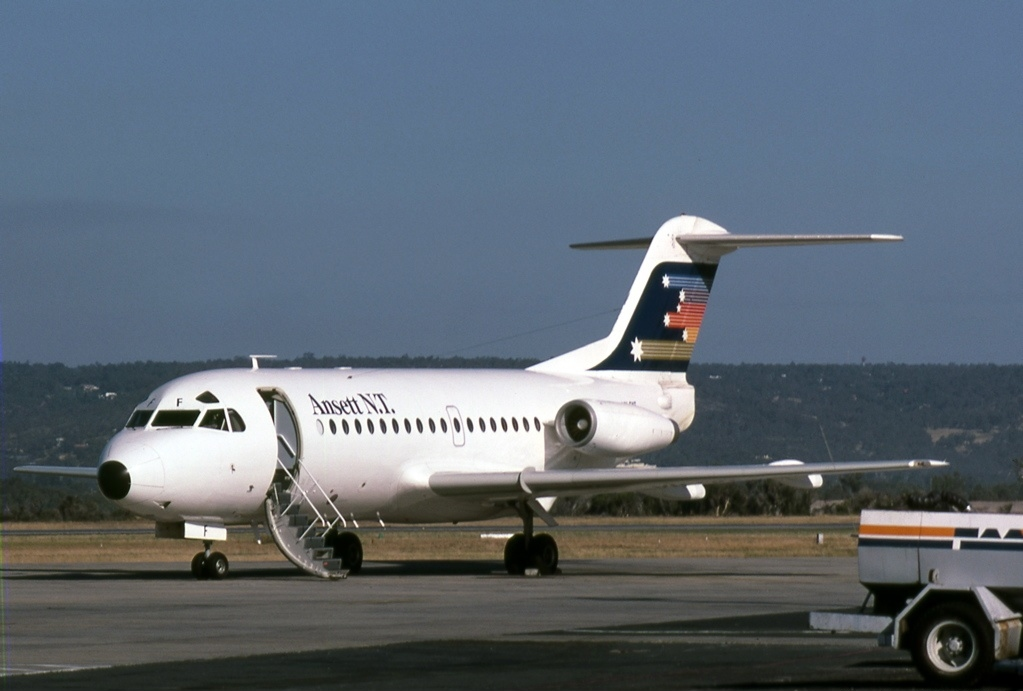
Fokker F28 in 1985, wearing 'Southern Cross' livery with Ansett NT titles

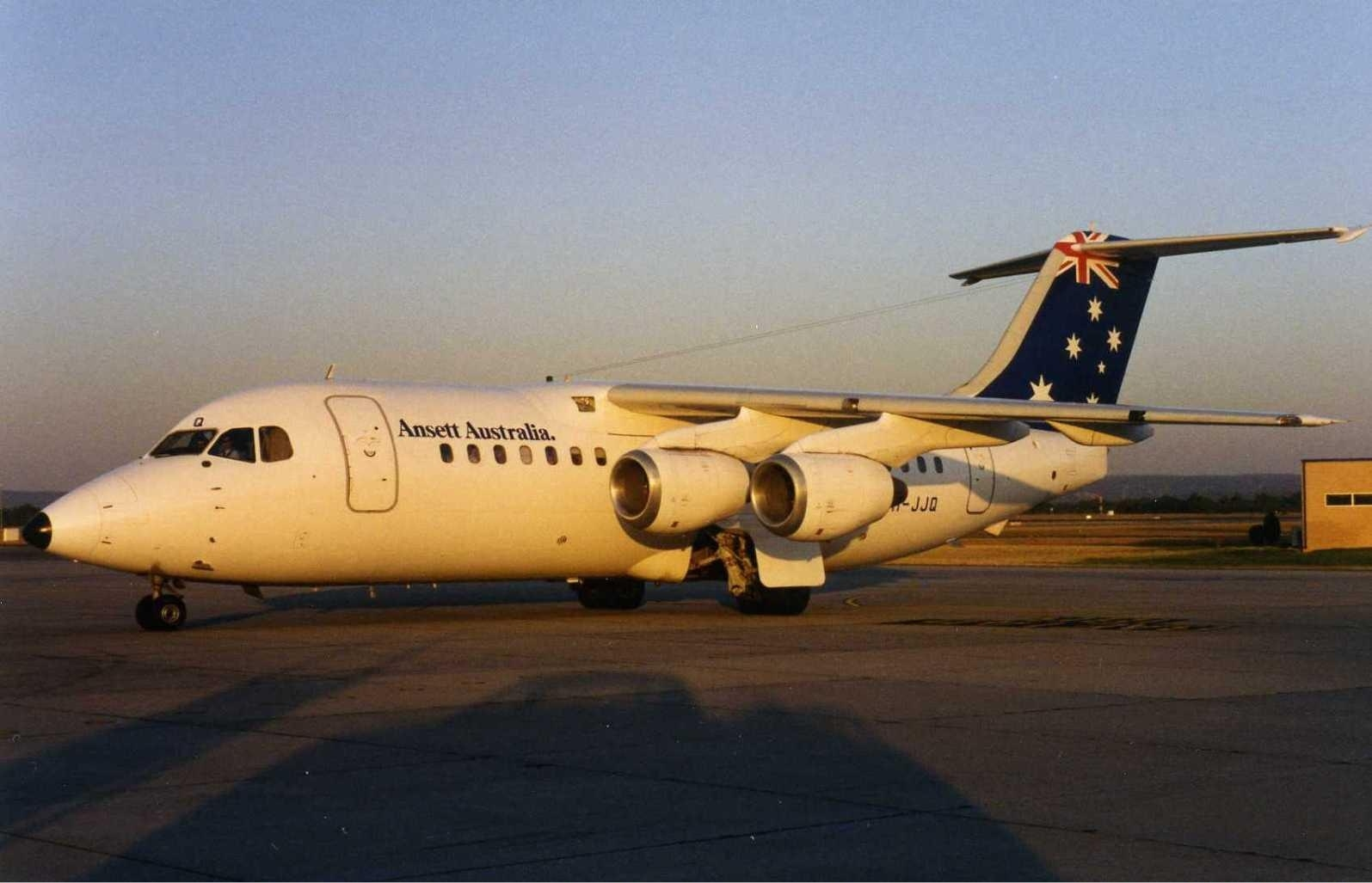
Ansett Australia BAe 146 at Perth in the short-lived 'Flag Livery'

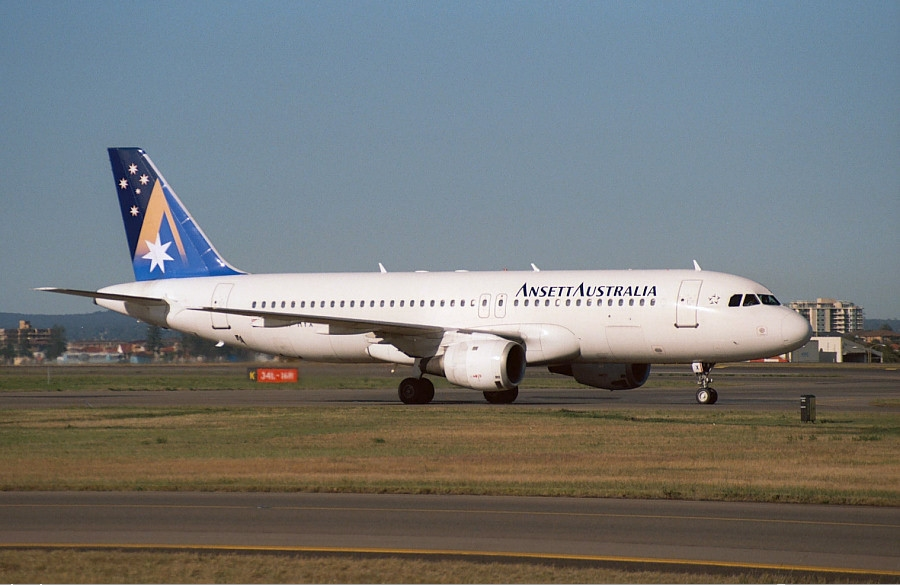
Ansett Australia Airbus A320 in the final 'Starmark' livery at Sydney in 1999

Ansett Airways remained a big player as ANA and TAA battled for supremacy in the 1940s and 1950s. Ansett operated around the big two, maintaining budget-fare interstate operations with DC-3s and later Convair CV-340s previously operated by Braniff International Airways in the United States. The airline was backed up by extensive road transport operations, including Ansett Freight Express and Ansett Pioneer Coaches, as well as the Ansair coach-building operation.

The Menzies government, while supporting TAA, because of the excellent dividends it paid to the government, wanted to avoid TAA having a monopoly on domestic services if ANA collapsed, as seemed likely. The only alternative, as it transpired, was for Ansett to buy the ANA operation. Ansett's bid had a number of financial supporters, most prominent of these being the Shell Oil Company. Douglas Aircraft Company was also concerned about ANA's demise, as TAA had ceased to be a customer for their aircraft. The ANA directors fiercely resisted this initially, but in October 1957, succumbed to Ansett's offer of £3.3 million for their airline. The new entity was called Ansett-ANA, the name it retained until 1 November 1968, when it became Ansett Airlines of Australia.

1970s logo

Ansett-ANA's excellent profit record was, at least in part, courtesy of the Menzies government's Two Airlines Policy that limited competition. The policy effectively blocked any other domestic interstate operators by way of a ban on importation of aircraft without a government licence. From 1957 until the 1980s, under the strict rules set down by the Two Airlines Policy, Ansett and TAA operated as virtual carbon copies of each other, operating the same aircraft at the same times, to the same destinations, at fares, which were identical (under strict federal government policy). If either airline wished to change its fares, they had to obtain federal government approval.

Reg Ansett then set out to ensure no other competitors could rise up to challenge his airline. He took control of Adelaide-based Guinea Airways (renamed Airlines of South Australia) and Sydney-based Butler Air Transport (renamed Airlines of New South Wales). The takeover of Butler was achieved with covert support from the Menzies government and by Ansett engineering his employees' purchases of Butler shares (in a similar way as had just been attempted by Butler). He then flew the employees to a general meeting in Sydney and forced a vote in favour of selling out to Ansett. Ansett later purchased Perth-based MacRobertson Miller Airlines, buying 70% of the shares in 1963 and completing the takeover in November 1968. Unlike Ansett's other regional acquisitions MMA retained its own identity (aircraft flew in Ansett livery but with MMA logotypes) for many years, finally becoming Airlines of Western Australia in 1981.

Following the takeover of ANA, Reg Ansett lobbied the government to block TAA's purchase of Sud Aviation Caravelle jet aircraft. He was concerned about his airline's ability to finance equivalent jet aircraft, and the major engineering leap required to go from an all-piston fleet direct to pure jet aircraft, TAA had been operating prop-jet Vickers Viscounts since 1954, so had expertise in jet technology. Ansett was successful in convincing the government to authorise the importation of more Viscounts and the new Lockheed L-188 Electra, marketed as the "Golden Jet" as with other turboprop airliners of the day. This action delayed the introduction of pure jet aircraft to Australian domestic airlines until 1964, when the Boeing 727-100 "Fan Jet" began flying. In keeping with the Two Airlines Policy, both TAA and Ansett started domestic jet services with the 727 on the same date (October 16), at the same time, on the same route (Sydney to Melbourne). However Ansett won a draw to be the first to land, thus becoming the airline to officially inaugurate jet operations to Australian domestic aviation, seven years after Reg Ansett had moved to block TAA's attempt to first purchase jet airliners.

An unusual feature of Ansett's operations was the flying-boat service from Rose Bay in Sydney to Lord Howe Island. This was operated by Ansett Flying Boat Services using Short Sandringham four-engined aircraft. The service ceased in 1974 when the Lord Howe Island Airport was completed.

=== Unification, deregulation and expansion ===
Ansett lost control of the company to Peter Abeles' TNT and Rupert Murdoch's News Corporation in 1979, with Abeles taking operational control of the airline. The airline prospered in the 1980s, and its various operating divisions were progressively unified both operationally and in terms of corporate identity. Following the change of ownership, Ansett introduced a new livery designed by Landor Associates, featuring plain white fuselages, simple Ansett logotypes in a serif typeface and a blue tailfin with a stylised Southern Cross logo. Through the mid-1980s, this livery was rolled out to the regional parts of the Ansett system which were also rebranded as the new colours were rolled out, becoming Ansett NSW, Ansett NT, Ansett WA etc..

The Southern Cross livery first appeared on newly purchased long-range versions of the Boeing 727-200, capable of direct flights between Sydney and Perth. Ansett's new owners placed multiple orders for new aircraft in the 1980s, buoyed up by strong business year-on-year and the passing of the Airlines Agreement Act of 1981 which maintained the closely regulated domestic airline system in Australia until at least the end of the decade, thus ensuring Ansett Transport Industries' profits for the foreseeable future. New Boeing 737s and five of the newly introduced Boeing 767 were purchased – the latter to a unique specification retaining a flight engineer in the cockpit by agreement with Ansett's crew unions. Despite being an existing operator of the Boeing 737 (and long-standing Boeing customer in general), Ansett placed an order worth over $1 billion in 1985 for the Airbus A320, which gradually replaced the 727s in the late 1980s/early 1990s and were branded by the airline as the 'Skystar'. Two years later Ansett ordered 21 new Boeing 737s (in -300 and -500 form) to phase out the older 737 models.

This diverse fleet of similar aircraft from different manufacturers was unusual in the airline industry. The new Boeing 767s were also beset by mechanical and maintenance issues, leading them to be out of service during several key periods of heavy traffic and operating for the airline at a loss. These issues were further reflected in Ansett's regional operations which had a wide range of regional airliners of piston-, turboprop and jet-power types. Many of these were only operated in small numbers, adding to crew, training and maintenance costs and several key types were approaching 15 or 20 years old. This incurred increased costs to Ansett. In 1985, the same year the Airbus order was placed, Ansett became a launch customer for the Fokker 50 turboprop, ordering ten aircraft with a view to replacing its successful but ageing fleet of Fokker F27s. Ansett also ordered a total of 11 British Aerospace 146s, which gradually replaced Fokker F28 Fellowship jets from 1990.

In addition to these heavy spending costs on fleet renewal, a number of substantial investments performed badly, including a share in the US America West Airlines (which filed for bankruptcy and survived) and its Hamilton Island resort (which went into receivership). In 1984, Ansett along with TAA was embroiled in controversy after it banned HIV-positive individuals from travelling on their planes to protect their staff. The Australian Flight Attendants Association ultimately rejected the bans.

In October 1987, the federal government gave Ansett and TAA the three years' notice required to terminate the Airlines Agreement, with effect from 31 October 1990. This deregulated the airline industry in Australia and exposed Ansett to direct competition for the first time. Ansett had anticipated this change and in July of that year had acquired East-West Airlines, a regional airline that had gradually expanded from its origins in New South Wales to become an inter-state operator. East-West had circumvented the regulations of the Two Airlines Policy by flying between the regulated state capitals via smaller intermediate airports, allowing it both offer a denser and more accessible service pattern and much lower fares than the ones set by regulation charged by Ansett and TAA. East-West had become Ansett's main competitor in many of its regional services and the airline's growth played a large part in the successful campaign to overturn the Two Airlines Policy. In preparation for deregulation East-West's owners sold the company but within weeks the new owner, Stan Perron, sold the airline to Ansett. At this stage the East-West brand was retained, but with an updated livery.

Similar deregulation of the airline industry had been introduced in New Zealand in the late 1980s, and Ansett pursued this opportunity to expand its operations internationally. In 1987 Ansett entered into an agreement with the owners of the struggling New Zealand domestic airline Newmans Air which saw Ansett Transport Industries take on a 50 per cent stake in a recapitalised and expanded company renamed Ansett New Zealand. Ansett NZ adopted the same white Landor livery as its parent company, but with the four red stars of the New Zealand flag on the tail in place of the six white ones (as per the flag of Australia) on the Ansett livery, and therefore also lacking the green and orange 'speed stripes' on the tail.

In its own preparation for the new deregulated industry, Ansett rebranded itself in mid-1990, taking on the name Ansett Australia and adopting a new livery with the Australian flag on the tail. This change also saw the end of the East-West name, being replaced by 'Ansett Express', which was adopted for the short-haul and commuter services in New South Wales formerly operated by Ansett NSW and East-West. This rebranding also followed a period of debt restructuring and by the start of 1994 the company was reported to be back to making an operating profit. By this point all the regional branding had been dropped, with all aircraft carrying the same Ansett scheme, and a new tail logo called the 'Starmark' (combining the Southern Cross of the previous livery, the blue of the flag livery and a stylised 'A' as a nod to Ansett's 1960s scheme) had been introduced. This final change also saw the withdrawal of the Ansett Express branding, with these services now being flown under the corporate Ansett Australia title.

The deregulation of the industry also opened up possibilities for Ansett to move into international flights for the first time. On 11 September 1993, the first international Ansett flight was made to Bali using a Boeing 767. To further expand its international operations, Ansett Australia leased a pair of Boeing 747-300s from Singapore Airlines in August 1994 to inaugurate services to Osaka and Hong Kong. Two more B747s were leased from Singapore Airlines the next year to enable services to Jakarta in January 1996 and to Shanghai in the summer of 1997. Ansett branded its B747s as 'Spaceships'.

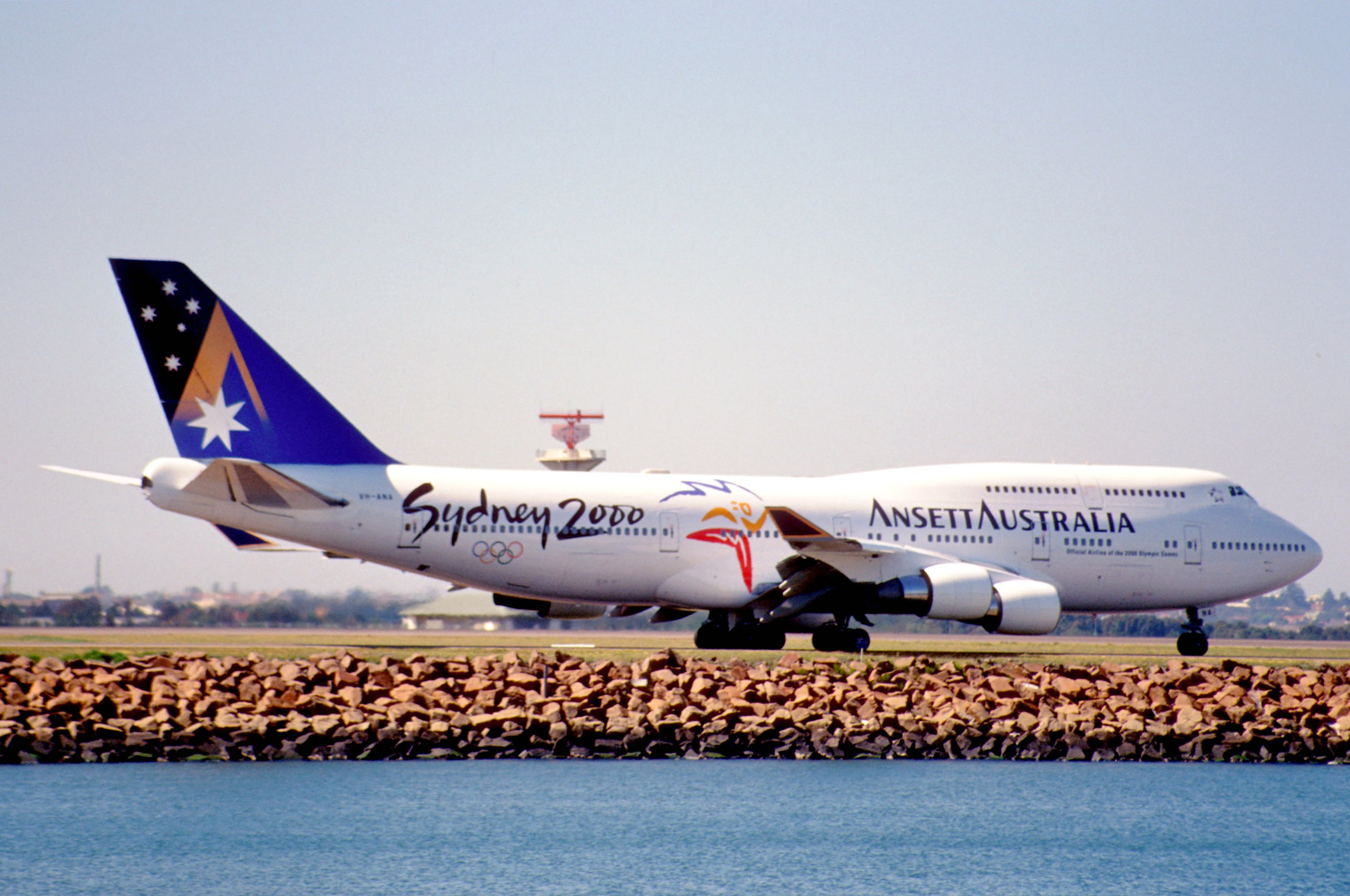
Boeing 747-400 Spaceship at Sydney Airport in September 1999

In 1996 a consortium led by Ansett, with five international partner airlines, defeated Qantas in the bidding to become official airline of the Sydney 2000 Olympics. Ansett spent an estimated A$60 million on Olympic-related sponsorship, advertising and free travel, but was hit by what the business magazine BRW described as a successful ambush marketing campaign by Qantas. Ansett saw this tie-in as a key marketing opportunity to expand its presence in southern and eastern Asia. Five Boeing 747-400s were leased (four dry leased from Singapore Airlines and one wet leased from Qantas) to add further services and new routes to Seoul, Taipei, and Kuala Lumpur. The aircraft were branded with 'Sydney 2000' livery. Neither the Olympic Games nor the new routes generated the expected traffic, and several of these new routes were withdrawn shortly after the Games concluded. This destabilised the finances of the company considerably, in tandem with other industrial and internal factors (see below) right before the September 11 attacks affected the global airline industry and economy.

=== Air New Zealand merger and collapse ===
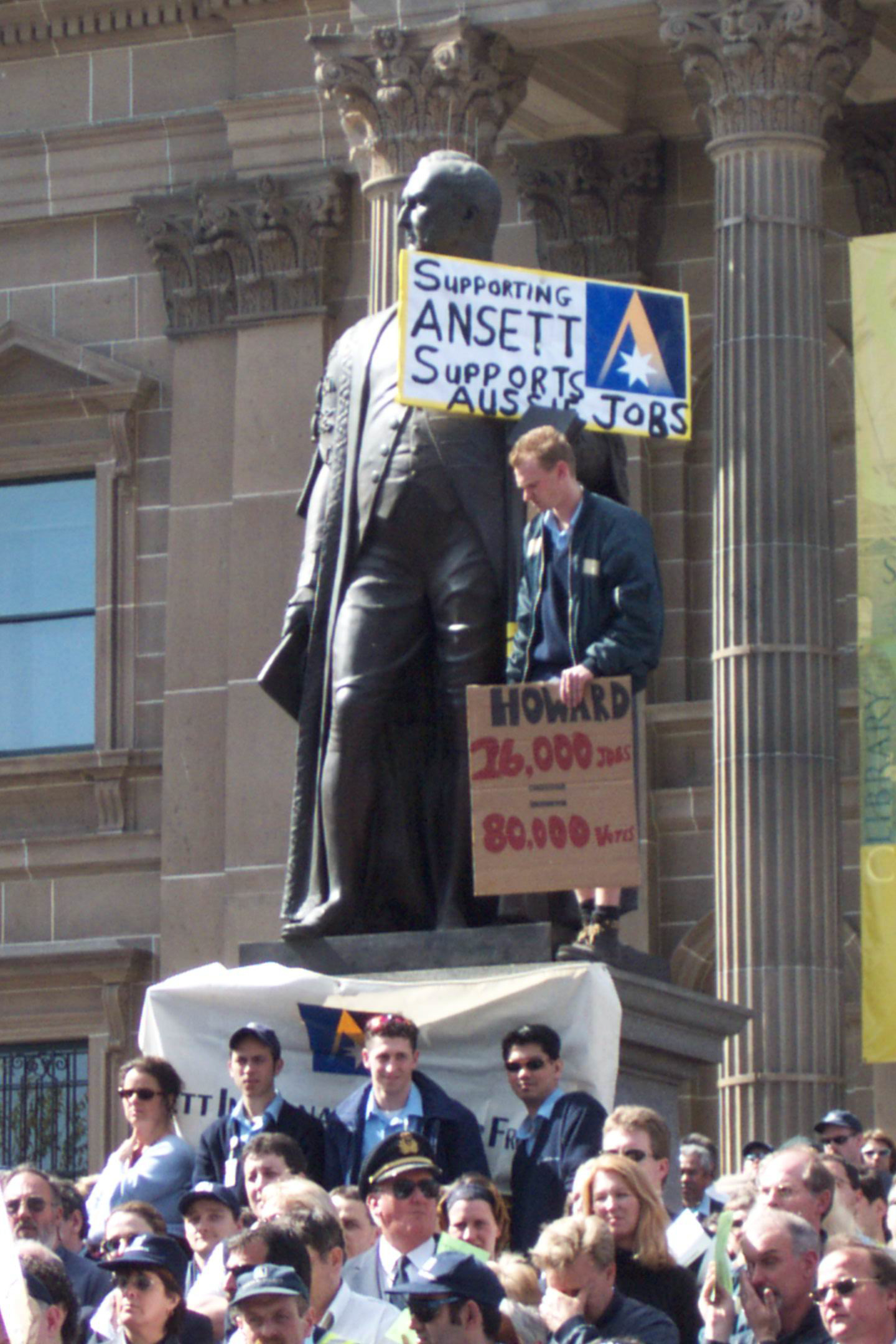
On 14 September 2001, the day of Ansett's closure announcement, thousands of employees met at the State Library of Victoria in Melbourne to protest.

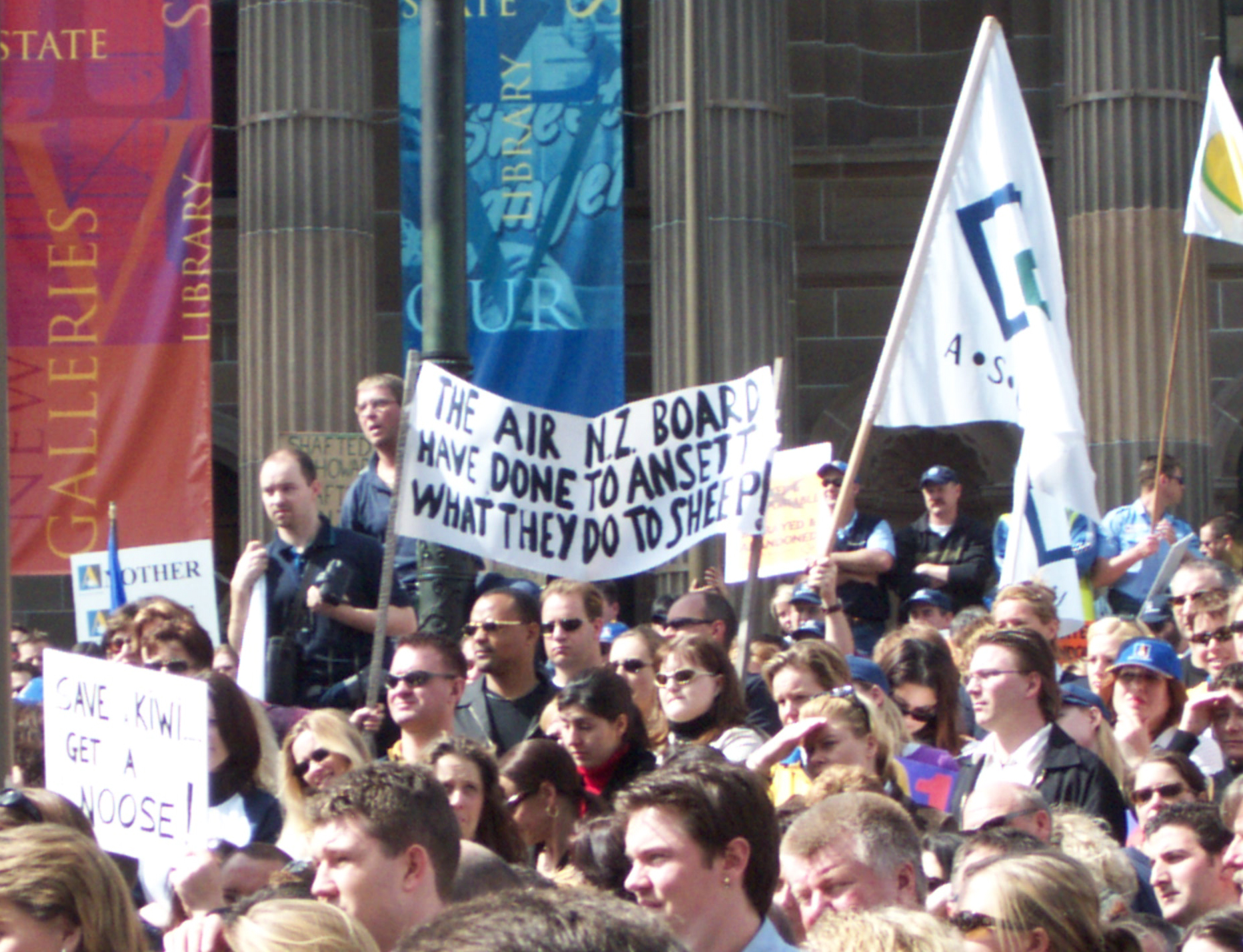
Many employees expressed anger at what they believed was Air New Zealand's culpability in Ansett's financial collapse.

==== Air New Zealand's entry (1994–1996) ====
Ansett had expanded into New Zealand in 1987 through its subsidiary Ansett New Zealand after the government of New Zealand opened its skies to the airline. Under a memorandum of understanding signed by the two governments in 1992, a single trans-Tasman aviation market was to be completed on 1 November 1994, when Air New Zealand would have gained the right to operate domestic services within Australia. A week before that date the Keating government withdrew the domestic rights; a Parliamentary Library chronology later recorded that this was done "reportedly to increase the value of shares in the float of Qantas". According to The Australian Financial Review, the decision followed a meeting at which the Qantas chairman, Gary Pemberton, showed the transport minister, Laurie Brereton, internal projections of the damage Air New Zealand's entry would do to the government's planned float of Qantas; the newspaper reported that concerns about the float and about Ansett's commercial future were paramount in the decision. The government indicated that Air New Zealand should instead seek an alliance with Ansett if it wanted wider rights.

Air New Zealand's negotiations to buy into Ansett began in late 1994 and lasted some 20 months. Qantas, which then owned almost 20% of Air New Zealand, opposed the transaction. Its chairman urged the Australian government to limit Air New Zealand's holding in Ansett to 25%, and at hearings of New Zealand's Commerce Commission Air New Zealand accused Qantas of trying to undermine the deal, its counsel describing Qantas's opposition as "a cynical exercise of self-preservation against the effects of competition". In April 1996 the Commerce Commission rejected the deal because it would have given Air New Zealand an interest in its domestic rival, Ansett New Zealand. It cleared a revised deal in June 1996 on condition that News Limited buy all of Ansett New Zealand, so that Air New Zealand would have no stake in it. The federal Treasurer, Peter Costello, approved the purchase in September 1996 on condition that Ansett International remained substantially Australian-owned and controlled, and 51% of Ansett International was sold to Australian institutional investors.

Air New Zealand completed its purchase of TNT's 50% stake on 1 October 1996. It paid TNT A$325 million and committed a further A$150 million of new capital to Ansett, a total of A$475 million, while News Corporation retained the executive chairmanship and effective management control. Qantas sold its own shareholding in Air New Zealand in March 1997.

==== Full ownership (1999–2000) ====
In March 1999 Singapore Airlines agreed in principle to buy News Corporation's half of Ansett for about A$500 million, but Air New Zealand, which held a pre-emptive right over the shares, refused to waive it, and News broke off the sale talks in June 1999. On 18 February 2000 News instead agreed to sell its stake to Air New Zealand for A$580 million in cash plus a deferred payment then valued at about A$100 million, a total of about A$680 million. The purchase, which also required the foreign ownership limit for Australian international airlines to be raised from 25% to 49% so that Air New Zealand could hold 49% of Ansett International, was completed on 23 June 2000, giving Air New Zealand full ownership of Ansett.

While the purchase was pending, Qantas sought in March 2000 to buy Brierley Investments' 47% stake in Air New Zealand, a move that would have required Air New Zealand to sell its interest in Ansett; Brierley instead chose Singapore Airlines as Air New Zealand's strategic partner. In April 2000 Singapore Airlines bought 25% of Air New Zealand, the maximum then permitted for a single foreign airline. Air New Zealand's acting chairman, Jim Farmer, later acknowledged that it had carried out only "extremely limited" due diligence before moving to full ownership of Ansett.

==== Decline (2000–2001) ====
After the takeover Ansett was unable to fund urgently needed new aircraft and lost market share to Qantas and to new low-cost competitors. Its share of the domestic business travel market fell to 42–43% in 2000, from about 54–55% three years earlier. In 2000 two low-cost carriers, Impulse Airlines and Virgin Blue, began competing on the main routes between Sydney, Melbourne and Brisbane, setting off a fare war in which Qantas and Ansett cut fares heavily. Late in 2000 Ansett and Qantas contested a takeover of the regional airline Hazelton Airlines; Qantas withdrew in January 2001 after the Australian Competition and Consumer Commission (ACCC) opposed both bids, and some observers believed that it had entered the contest partly to force up the price Ansett would pay. Ansett, which continued to seek the commission's approval, completed the purchase for more than A$20 million in March 2001. In May 2001 Impulse, after accumulating losses, contracted its aircraft and crews to Qantas.

The age of Ansett's fleet also caused safety problems. In December 2000 seven of its Boeing 767-200s, among the oldest in service, were grounded after the airline discovered that it had not carried out mandatory structural inspections that Boeing required once an aircraft had made 25,000 flights; one aircraft had flown about 9,000 flights beyond that point. The Civil Aviation Safety Authority (CASA) allowed the aircraft back into service on Christmas Eve, giving Ansett 90 days to complete the inspections. In April 2001, after cracks were found in engine pylon fittings on three of the older aircraft, CASA grounded all ten of Ansett's 767s on the eve of the Easter holidays, citing repeated failures to maintain the aircraft properly, and moved to require the airline to show cause why its air operator's certificate should not be withdrawn; it backed down after Ansett presented a package of reforms to its maintenance procedures. An investigation by the Australian Transport Safety Bureau later found that Ansett's system for introducing and scheduling the 767 structural inspections had been "deficient and vulnerable to human error", and found no evidence that CASA had given formal consideration to monitoring Ansett's introduction of the inspection program.

By mid-2001 Ansett was losing heavily. The Australian government later said that it had known in June 2001 that Ansett was losing A$18 million a week but had been assured that improvement was in sight, and in early September Air New Zealand revealed that Ansett was losing A$1.3 million a day. Contemporary commentators attributed the airline's decline to a lack of capital and poor management, combined with heavy debt, an ageing fleet, a weak Australian dollar and the intense competition that followed the arrival of Impulse and Virgin Blue and Qantas's response to it; other factors cited included union-negotiated pay and conditions and a clash of cultures between New Zealand and Australian management. Air New Zealand estimated that it would need to raise about NZ$5 billion over four to five years to renew the group's fleet.

==== Recapitalisation dispute (2001) ====
On 29 May 2001 Qantas proposed to buy Singapore Airlines' 25% stake in Air New Zealand and some or all of Brierley's 30% holding, with Air New Zealand selling Ansett to Singapore Airlines, in effect dividing the Australasian market between Qantas and Singapore Airlines. Singapore Airlines put forward its own plan to raise its stake in Air New Zealand from 25% to 49% and inject new capital into the group, which the Air New Zealand board endorsed in June; this required the consent of the New Zealand government, which was reluctant to relax the 25% limit on ownership by a foreign airline. The Australian government backed the Qantas plan; the transport minister, John Anderson, said that it would lead to a "more robust, workable" arrangement for Australian aviation. Qantas made representations to governments on both sides of the Tasman, and its chief executive, Geoff Dixon, wrote to the New Zealand finance minister, Michael Cullen, on 25 June. On 30 July Singapore Airlines publicly rejected the Qantas proposal, saying that it stood ready to inject A$573 million into Air New Zealand and Ansett if allowed to raise its stake to 49%. After a federal Cabinet meeting the next day, Anderson travelled to Wellington to convey the Australian government's support for the Qantas option, and he sided with New Zealand ministers in opposing an increase in Singapore Airlines' stake. In a letter to the state and territory governments, Ansett accused Anderson of confusing Qantas's commercial interests with the national interest.

Air New Zealand also sought to buy Virgin Blue to reduce Ansett's costs on less profitable routes. Gary Toomey, the chief executive of Air New Zealand and Ansett, later said that he had arranged a deal with Virgin's founder, Richard Branson, in April 2001, but that it collapsed after a four-month delay caused by a disagreement with Singapore Airlines. On 4 September 2001 Virgin Blue rejected an offer of A$250 million from Air New Zealand as too low, and at a media conference Branson tore up a mock cheque for that amount, declaring that Virgin Blue was not for sale. Singapore Airlines then withdrew its plan to inject funds into Air New Zealand and Ansett, and declined an offer to buy Ansett for NZ$500 million.

==== Collapse (September 2001) ====
In early September the directors of Air New Zealand asked Qantas to buy Ansett. According to the journalist Matt O'Sullivan, Toomey had approached Qantas some weeks earlier with an asking price of about A$400 million, which the Qantas board rejected, and now offered the airline for one dollar. At the request of Air New Zealand and the Australian government, and with the consent of the ACCC, Qantas and Virgin Blue began negotiations over parts of the business, but on 11 September Qantas ruled out a purchase, Dixon saying that "Ansett's problems are far too great for Qantas to take on". O'Sullivan wrote that Qantas had calculated that it would be taking on about A$800 million in obligations, not counting the cost of fixing the airline, and that its board declined after it could not obtain union agreement to changes in work practices at both airlines. The Australian government declined requests for financial support to keep Ansett operating, and the Prime Minister, John Howard, later said that a bailout would have been "monumentally irresponsible".

Quickly running out of both lines of credit and options, Air New Zealand on 12 September 2001 placed the Ansett group of companies into voluntary administration with PricewaterhouseCoopers. On 14 September, the administrator determined that Ansett was not viable to continue operations (primarily due to the apparent lack of any funds to cover fuel, catering, or employee wages) and grounded the fleets of Ansett and its subsidiaries Hazelton Airlines, Kendell, Skywest, and Aeropelican. Flights already in the air at the time the decision was made continued on to their destinations. Customers and almost all employees had no warning of the stoppage in operations. An Ansett Boeing 767-200 operating on behalf of Ansett Airfreight due to depart Melbourne for Launceston, Tasmania, was the first aircraft to be stopped from flying. It was unable to be unloaded until midday the next day, as no paid staff were on duty. Everyone had been told in the days leading up to 14 September that flights would continue on schedule, and most Ansett employees did not find out until they showed up for work at dawn that day. Thousands of passengers were left stranded and more than 16,000 people found themselves out of a job, making this the largest mass job-loss event in Australian history. Widespread protests were held by workers, including the blockade of an Air New Zealand plane about to carry then New Zealand Prime Minister Helen Clark home from Melbourne.

On 17 September PricewaterhouseCoopers resigned as administrator amid allegations of a conflict of interest arising from its role as an adviser to Air New Zealand, and on a union application the Federal Court appointed Mark Korda and Mark Mentha of Andersen in its place. The Australian government blamed Air New Zealand's management for the collapse and undertook to guarantee A$500 million of employees' entitlements, while the Australian Securities & Investments Commission (ASIC) began an investigation into whether Air New Zealand's directors had breached their duties.

==== Settlement and disputed causes ====
Air New Zealand was accused of asset-stripping Ansett in its final months and of leaving it exposed to rising fuel prices by failing to hedge its fuel costs, and the administrators announced an investigation. Air New Zealand denied the claims, noting that it had funded Ansett's A$180 million loss in the previous year. On 19 September Mentha said that he had found no evidence that Air New Zealand had stripped Ansett's assets, and in an affidavit filed in October he said that despite rumours of wrongdoing by the Air New Zealand group and its directors, he had "not presently found any evidence of it".

On 4 October 2001 the New Zealand government announced an NZ$885 million recapitalisation of Air New Zealand, which left the government owning about 83% of the airline. As part of the package, Air New Zealand paid Ansett's administrators A$150 million, gave up A$160 million of claims against Ansett and forgave an advance of A$32 million for wages, in return for a release from all claims against it and its directors, including any liability under a letter of comfort for A$400 million that it had given Ansett in August. Mentha said that he had expressed concern about compromising, "in a limited way", claims against the directors of the Air New Zealand and Ansett groups without any investigation, but that the settlement avoided years of litigation in a foreign jurisdiction and gave the administrators the cash they needed to keep Ansett flying; Korda said that it did not restrict ASIC's investigation. The Federal Court approved the settlement on 11 October.

The causes of the collapse remained disputed. Farmer attributed it to "intense, quite irrational competition" in the Australian domestic market and to weak currencies, and accused Qantas and the Australian government of having caused fatal delays to Singapore Airlines' recapitalisation plan, saying that Qantas's behaviour "has been predatory, and the Australian Government has assisted them in it"; he also said that a restructuring of Qantas's fares earlier in 2001, which removed advance-purchase conditions, had hurt Ansett. Dixon replied that the assertions were "without any foundation in fact", that Qantas had every right to lobby for a stake in Air New Zealand, and that an independent audit commissioned by Qantas had found its fare changes to be a necessary response to the new low-cost carriers, to which Ansett had been "unable, or not prepared to respond".

In late September The Australian Financial Review reported that Howard, after lobbying by Dixon and the Qantas chairman, Margaret Jackson, had overridden senior ministers who favoured the Singapore Airlines plan at the Cabinet meeting in July, a decision the newspaper said extinguished the last hope of survival for the airline. Howard said that the report was ridiculous and that the government had indicated that "if all things were equal" an alliance between Qantas and Air New Zealand, with Singapore Airlines teaming up with Ansett, "would be a good thing", but had always recognised that it was ultimately a matter for the New Zealand government. He had told Parliament on 18 September that the government "did unashamedly have a preference for what was called the Qantas option ... because we took the view that, if you are going to have two airlines, it would be a good idea that one of them was Australian owned". Dixon said that Qantas had "every right to put its case" but that the government had given it no indication that it supported the Qantas proposal, and he rejected suggestions that Qantas's lobbying had led to Ansett's demise or that Qantas was profiteering from it. O'Sullivan later wrote that, by backing the Qantas proposal, the Australian government "scuttled the only viable plan to rescue Ansett".

Others emphasised Ansett's own weaknesses. Rod Eddington, who had run Ansett until 2000 and later sat on the Qantas board as a British Airways nominee, said that its demise "was of its own making", citing its complex and ageing fleet and the diversion of management attention to peripheral businesses. Toomey said that the airline had been neglected for many years, and Dixon that it had been neglected by some of its shareholders and had failed to reduce its costs. Helen Clark said in March 2002 that Ansett had been "an airline with quite considerable problems which Air New Zealand foolishly bought into lock, stock and barrel without any due diligence in order to keep Singapore Airlines out". In 2004 the administrator Mark Korda said that Ansett would still be flying had News Corporation remained its owner, as News had the capital base to keep it going.

Qantas was the main beneficiary of the collapse. Before it, Qantas had held about 56% of the domestic market, Ansett about 37% and Virgin Blue 7%. Qantas moved aircraft from its international network onto domestic routes and absorbed Ansett's high-value corporate accounts, and the ACCC chairman, Allan Fels, warned that it would be "highly dominant". By March 2002 Dixon was citing an 85% share of the domestic market, and Qantas had employed about 600 former Ansett staff. Dixon said that Qantas had found itself in a position "not of our doing" and pledged that it would not raise fares.

=== Ansett Mark II and Tesna ===
After the federal government agreed to underwrite up to A$25 million of ticket sales for 12 weeks, Ansett resumed limited services between Sydney and Melbourne on 29 September 2001, using only the Airbus A320 Skystar fleet, and extended them to Brisbane and Perth in early October. This was referred to as Ansett Mark II, an operation run and financed by Ansett Australia under administration. The purpose of getting Ansett back into the air was to attract a buyer for the business and to generate positive cash flow. Attempts by Ansett's Voluntary Administrators to re-engage Singapore Airlines to consider a role in resurrecting Ansett through a meeting on 6 October 2001 resulted in Singapore Airlines agreeing to play a consultancy role in this effort.

The revived and scaled-back operation ran on a tight budget, and its service reflected that. It consisted of single-class seating with no catering, interlining baggage, valet parking, or frequent flyer points. After a month back in the air, the Golden Wing Club Lounges reopened, but like the scaled-back flying operation, provided no refreshments or other amenities apart from coffee and water. Ansett was essentially in "lock down" mode, while the administrators tried to source buyers in a very challenging market. Ansett Mark II traded only as "Ansett" in a different font to separate it from the former operation. It traded from Ansett terminals, with Ansett ground staff, crew, and baggage handlers working around the clock to make it a success with limited resources. Designated gates at each of Ansett's terminals were used for the operation, while aircraft not being used were moved away to more distant gates, with the disused concourses being sealed off.

The revived airline faced strong competition. Qantas leased aircraft and crews from Air Canada for trans-Tasman flights, freeing its own aircraft for domestic routes, and offered low fares; Mentha said that he understood Qantas's actions but warned that "any competition with excess capacity will clearly impact Ansett's ability to gain custom and maintain it". The ACCC investigated whether Qantas's one-way Sydney–Melbourne fare of A$88, introduced after Ansett relaunched with an introductory fare of A$99, amounted to predatory pricing, and in November said that it was examining twelve specific allegations of anti-competitive conduct by Qantas, made by Virgin Blue, Ansett's administrators and an airport operator. Qantas denied profiteering from Ansett's collapse.

On 8 November 2001 the administrators agreed to sell Ansett's mainline assets to the Tesna consortium, led by Melbourne businessmen Solomon Lew and Lindsay Fox, in a transaction valued at more than A$1.1 billion; a committee of creditors endorsed the proposal on 15 November, and a meeting of creditors approved the sale on 29 January 2002. The plan involved creating a whole "new" Ansett out of the ashes of the old, but the trademark font and "Star Mark" logo reinstated. It would be a full-service, two-class, single fleet-type domestic airline. It included very reduced staff numbers and an all new Airbus A320 fleet. The new Ansett would operate out of the old Ansett terminals, and temporarily lease the former Ansett's A320 fleet until newer replacements arrived. Loyalty products such as the Golden Wing Club and Global Rewards frequent-flyer program would be relaunched.

Golden Wing Club memberships held at the time of the collapse would be restored and extended by six months at no charge. Tesna appointed James Hogan, formerly chief operating officer of BMI British Midland, as chief executive and made other senior appointments. A new head office was planned, and Airbus showcased a new A320 to the consortium. A new catering company was selected, with new Business and Economy Class in-flight meals trialed on passengers on select Mark II services in readiness for the new operation.

Tesna, the administrators and the unions sought government assistance for the revived airline, which Qantas opposed. Dixon urged the government to reject their request that its A$195 million loan for employee entitlements be converted into a grant, saying that it would be "completely unacceptable to tax Qantas and Virgin passengers in order to subsidise the ongoing operations of Ansett", and warned Qantas staff that the airline would move work offshore if a revived Ansett secured more favourable deals with unions and governments. The government refused to convert the loan and said that it would not provide support that skewed the market in Tesna's favour, although it agreed to some regulatory measures; Qantas told the government that it was prepared to enter into a code of conduct.

The agreement with Ansett's administrators, although well-advanced, collapsed in late February 2002. Completion had been delayed by a dispute with Sydney Airports Corporation over the transfer of Ansett's Sydney terminal lease, and at 6 pm on 26 February, two days before the deadline for completing the sale, Fox and Lew told the administrators that they were withdrawing. They blamed their inability to reach agreement with third parties, principally over the transfer of airport terminal leases, environmental liabilities and the use of Ansett's IATA code, and denied that finance had been the problem; Sydney Airports Corporation said that it had agreed to assign the terminal lease to Tesna that day. The Australian Financial Review reported that Tesna had been rebuffed by potential lenders, and that advisers to Virgin Blue, with which Tesna had sought a joint venture, had identified a shortfall of about A$100 million in Tesna's business plan; Tesna rejected the report. Fox and Lew also alleged that the federal government had conspired against the deal. Anderson dismissed as nonsense their claim that they had not sought commercial assistance and released a letter in which Tesna had asked for concessions that he said could have cost taxpayers up to A$1 billion; Tesna said that its requests had not been excessive given the state of the airline industry.

With no other buyer able to take over the airline, the administrators ceased all flying operations at 23:59 on 4 March 2002, with the last commercial flight, AN152 from Perth to Sydney, operated by A320-211 VH-HYI, touching down at 06:42 on 5 March. Staff filled Golden Wing Lounges across the country for mass wakes as the final flights came in to land.

=== Entitlements ===
In May 2002 Korda and Mentha left Andersen to set up their own firm, now KordaMentha, taking the Ansett administration with them. ASIC's investigation had examined whether Ansett had traded while insolvent and whether the directors of Air New Zealand and Ansett had breached their duties; in July 2002 it ended the investigation, concluding that an attempt to prosecute Air New Zealand's directors would be expensive, complex and risky.

With Ansett now grounded again, the administrators began selling off Ansett's assets. This included its regional subsidiary airlines, which still continued to trade despite Ansett being grounded; Kendell and Hazelton were sold in 2002 to the Australiawide Airlines consortium, which merged them to form Regional Express. A creditors meeting in March 2002 voted in favour of an organised wind-up of the operation, under a deed of company arrangement, as opposed to an immediate liquidation. It was viewed that a deed of arrangement would give creditors a greater return than liquidation would provide.

Laid-off Ansett workers were eventually paid most of their entitlements, mostly through asset sales and leasing revenue; A$50 million of the A$150 million paid by Air New Zealand under its settlement with the administrators was also set aside for entitlements. Under the Special Employee Entitlements Scheme for Ansett group employees (SEESA), the federal government advanced employees their unpaid wages, annual leave, long service leave, pay in lieu of notice and up to eight weeks' redundancy pay, and was repaid from the administrators' distributions. To ensure there was no exposure to taxpayers, it imposed an Air Passenger Ticket Levy of A$10 on tickets for flights departing from 1 October 2001 (later charged as A$5 a sector); the levy was abolished on 30 June 2003. By 2010 SEESA had paid A$383.7 million to 13,072 former employees. Employees ended up receiving 96% of their entitlements.

=== Administration and asset sales ===
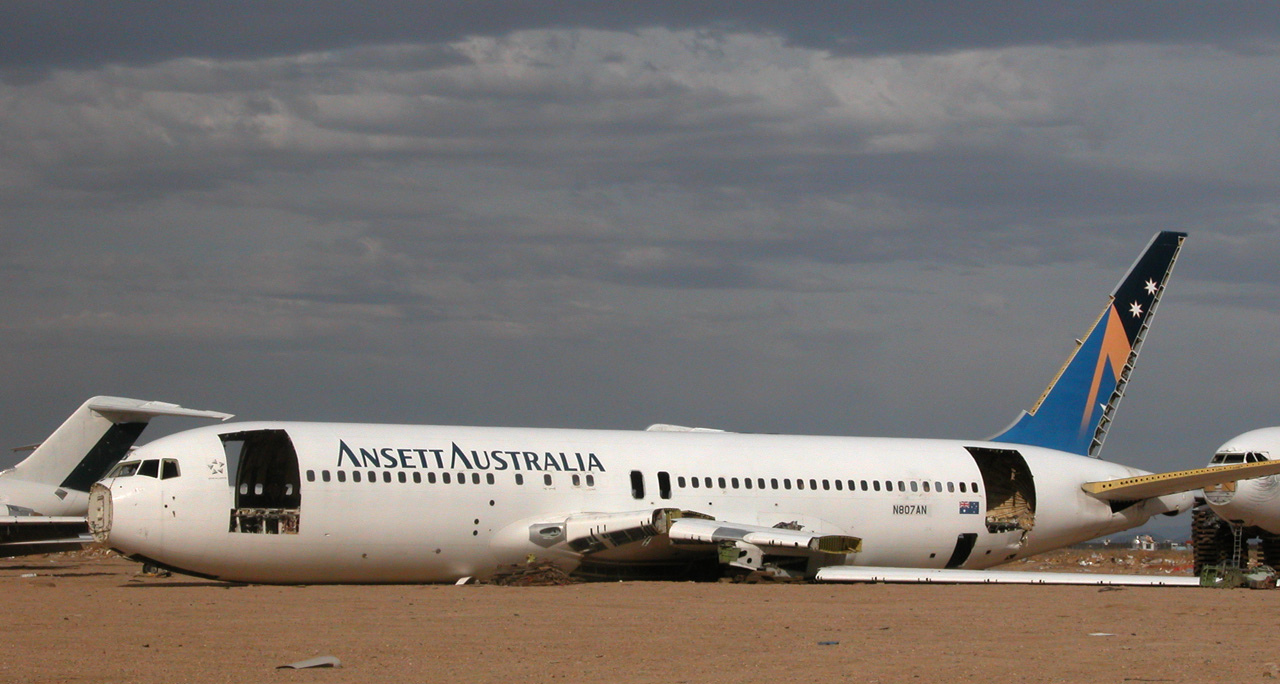
Boeing 767-200 VH-RMO being scrapped at the Mojave Airport & Spaceport

The depression of the global aviation industry after the September 11 attacks in New York City and Washington, DC, and later the rise of the Australian dollar, reduced the value of Ansett's aircraft. By April 2004, with 28 aircraft still unsold, the administrators, KordaMentha, had revised the estimated value of the remaining fleet from more than A$600 million at the time of the collapse, based on an independent valuation, to A$63 million. In the months following the final flight, the administrators negotiated the sale of the terminal leases back to the airport owners, recouping millions. After the ACCC told Qantas that it would not be allowed to acquire the Sydney terminal, which would have given it control of both major domestic terminals there, the lease was sold to Sydney Airports Corporation for A$192 million in May 2002; the Brisbane and Canberra terminals were also taken over by their airport operators. Auctions were held to sell Ansett's airport furniture and equipment. Its headquarters at 465/489 and 501 Swanston Street, Melbourne were sold to PDG Corporation for A$30 million. Some aircraft stored in heavy maintenance were broken up, as it was not cost-effective to restore them to an airworthy state.

The disposal of the former fleet did not progress quickly, given the depressed aviation market and the subsequent lack of demand by other carriers around the world whose operations had been crippled by the 9/11 attacks only months before. Following the final flight, nearly all of the A320 fleet was ferried back empty to Melbourne, where they sat at abandoned gates in storage. The Airbus A320 and Boeing 737 fleets ultimately found new owners first, and departed Australia between March 2002 and December 2006 as the banks finally reclaimed them, or as new owners were found.

The two Boeing 747s that were leased from Singapore Airlines were reclaimed within weeks of the collapse and returned to Singapore Airlines, which restored the original colours. They subsequently found new lives and were leased to Fiji's national carrier Fiji Airways, then known as Air Pacific. The more modern Boeing 767-300, of which Ansett had two, were reclaimed by the lessors in the following months, while two new Boeing 767-300 aircraft which arrived too late to enter service with Ansett, departed soon after. One aircraft was wet leased on a short-term basis by Qantas to bring additional aircraft to cover the loss of Ansett, but the aircraft retained its Ansett registration while under lease to it. Another new 767-300, which was halfway through its ferry from Canada, never made it to Australia and returned to Canada. The Kendell CRJ-200 jets returned to Canada within twelve months of the initial collapse.

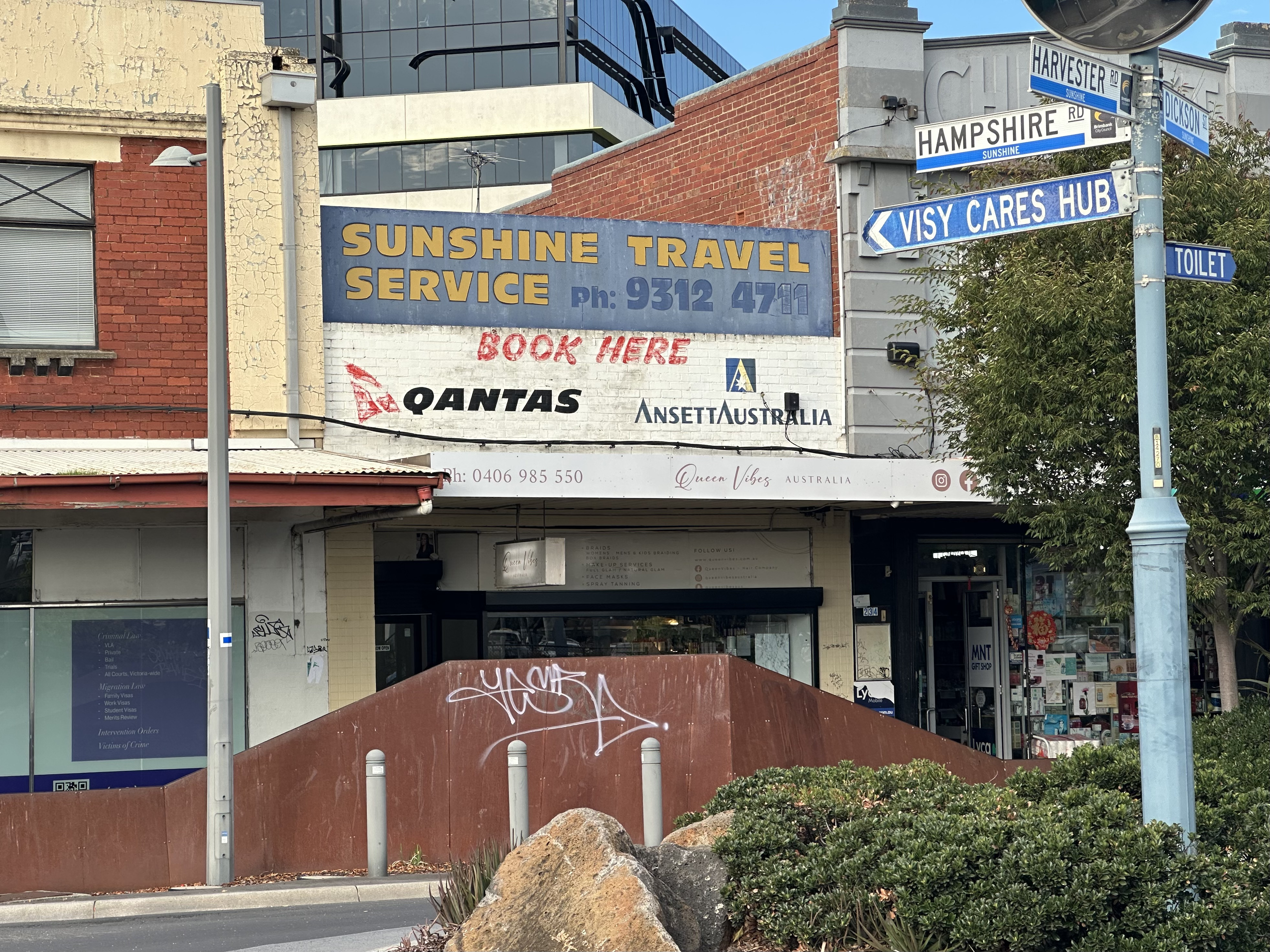
Ansett's logo still visible on a building in Sunshine, Victoria, in 2026

With the newer aircraft gone, most of the older Boeing 767-200 fleet were moved from the Melbourne terminal gates as Virgin Blue moved into the former Ansett Terminal, and were placed into long-term storage at the Ansett Engineering Base until late 2004, when most were sold off to Aeroturbine and flown to the United States to be broken up into spare parts. Many of the British Aerospace 146 aircraft were also stored but broken up at Melbourne. As of 2008 the remains of one BAe 146 sit derelict at Brisbane Airport, and another BAe 146 remains at Perth Airport, although neither of them are still owned by Ansett or expected to fly again. A lone Boeing 767-200 survived the scrappers cull, was sold and continues to fly in the United States as a charter aircraft.

As of 2006, there were still in excess of 217,000 items and two properties belonging to the airline remaining for sale. In June 2010, a report tabled in the Senate showed that the Special Employee Entitlements Scheme for Ansett employees had finished making payments to former staff, and in September 2011 the administrators paid the fourteenth and final dividend to employees, bringing the administration of Ansett to an end. Staff received roughly 96% of their entitlements.

== Fleet ==
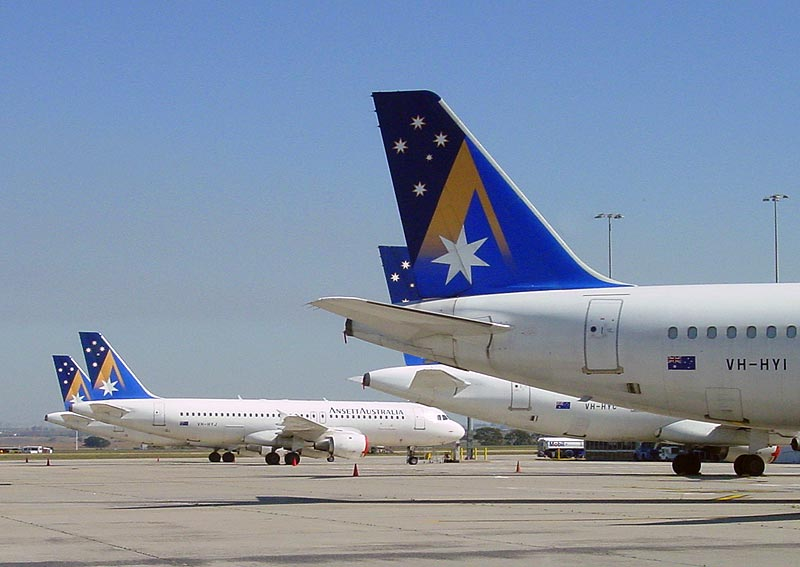
Airbus A320 Skystars laid up at Melbourne Airport after the airline's last flight in 2002

The Ansett Australia fleet as of 13 September 2001 (last day of trading) was made up of the following aircraft:

Ansett Australia fleet
Aircraft	In fleet	Notes
Airbus A320-200	20	Branded as "Ansett Skystar"
BAe 146-200	18	Used with Ansett Australia
BAe 146-200QT	18	Used with Ansett Australia
BAe 146-300	18	Used with Ansett New Zealand
Boeing 727-200F	1	Freight Aircraft
Boeing 737-300	23	
Boeing 747-300	3	Branded as "Ansett Spaceship"
Boeing 747-400	2	Leased from Singapore Airlines, branded as "Ansett Spaceship"
Boeing 767-200	9	Only airline to order 767s with a 3-crew cockpit.
Boeing 767-300	4	Only airline to order 767s with a 3-crew cockpit.
Bombardier CRJ-200	12	Operated by Kendell
De Havilland Twin Otter	4	Operated by Aeropelican
Fairchild Metro 23	7	Operated by Kendell and Hazelton Airlines
Fokker F27 Friendship	1	
Fokker F28 Fellowship	4	None operational at time of collapse
Fokker 50	9	Operated by Skywest
Saab 340	16	Operated by Kendell and Hazelton Airlines
Total	134	

Only the Airbus A320 was utilised from Ansett's original fleet during the brief re-launch of operations as "Ansett Mark II" from October 2001 to March 2002. The Boeing 737, Boeing 767, and Boeing 747 fleets were grounded from September 2001 onwards as were the BAe 146 fleet, with the exception of a one-off revenue flight from Cairns to Brisbane in November 2001, operating off the back end of a charter flight for the government. Two other Ansett BAe 146 aircraft were chartered by the federal government in late 2001 during the federal election campaign.

Several of the defunct fleet types did operate ferry flights back to Melbourne from wherever they ended up across Australia in the months after the collapse, and operated the occasional test flight around Melbourne to retain currency.

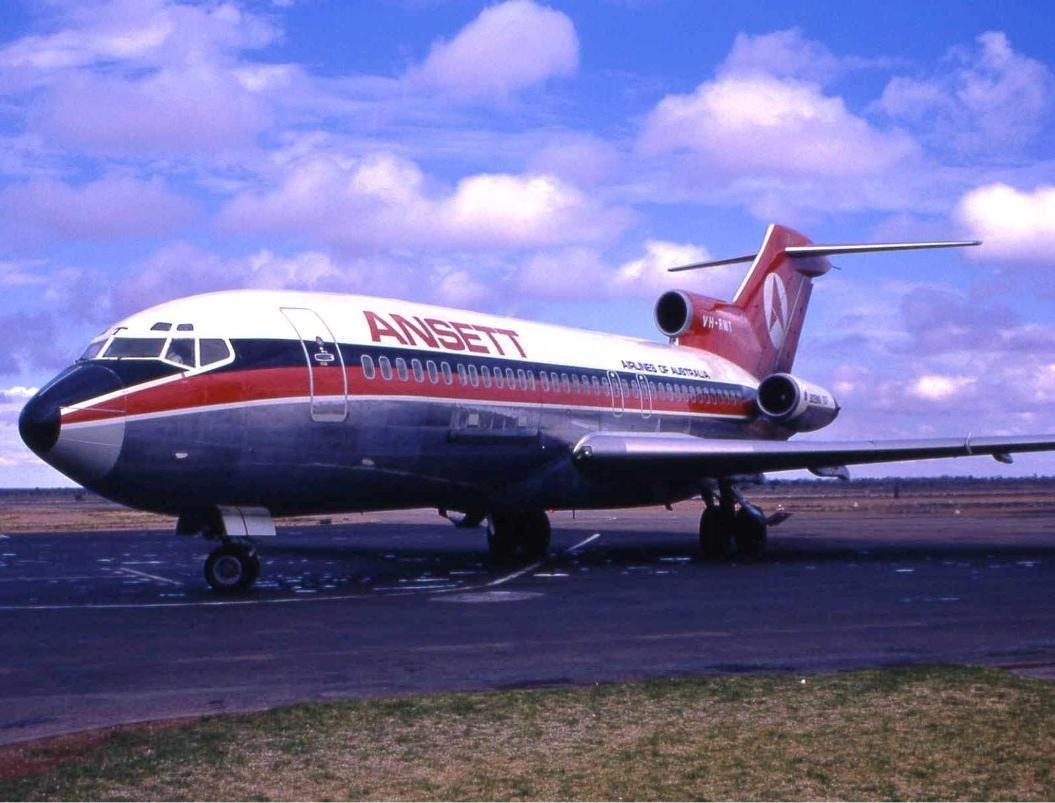
Boeing 727-100 at Sydney Airport in 1970

Of the subsidiary fleets, only the Kendell Bombardier CRJ200 did not return to active flying. The Fokker 50, Saab 340, Twin Otter and Metro 23 regional aircraft were all back flying for Skywest, Kendell, Hazelton and Aeropelican in the weeks following the collapse. Both Kendell and Hazelton merged to create Regional Express Airlines. As of 2013, five former Kendell Saab 340s are in service with Regional Express with the others phased out. Three of the former Hazelton Airlines Saab 340s are in service with Regional Express.

=== Historical fleet ===
Ansett Australia historical fleet
Aircraft	In fleet	Enter/exit service
Lockheed L-188A Golden Jet	?	1959–1984
Vickers Viscount Golden Jet	?	
Boeing 727-100/200	?	1964–late 1990s
Boeing 737-200	12	1981–1987
Douglas DC-3/C-47	41	1938–1975
Douglas DC-4	?	1963–1972
Douglas DC-6	?	
Aviation Traders ATL-98 Carvair	3	1965–1974
DeHavilland Caribou	4	
McDonnell Douglas DC-9-31	12	1967–1982
DeHavilland DHC 6	1	1965–1969
Fokker F28 Fellowship	4	1970–1999
Mohawk 298	2	1987–1991
Convair 240 Family	?	????–????
LET L-200 Morava	1	????–????

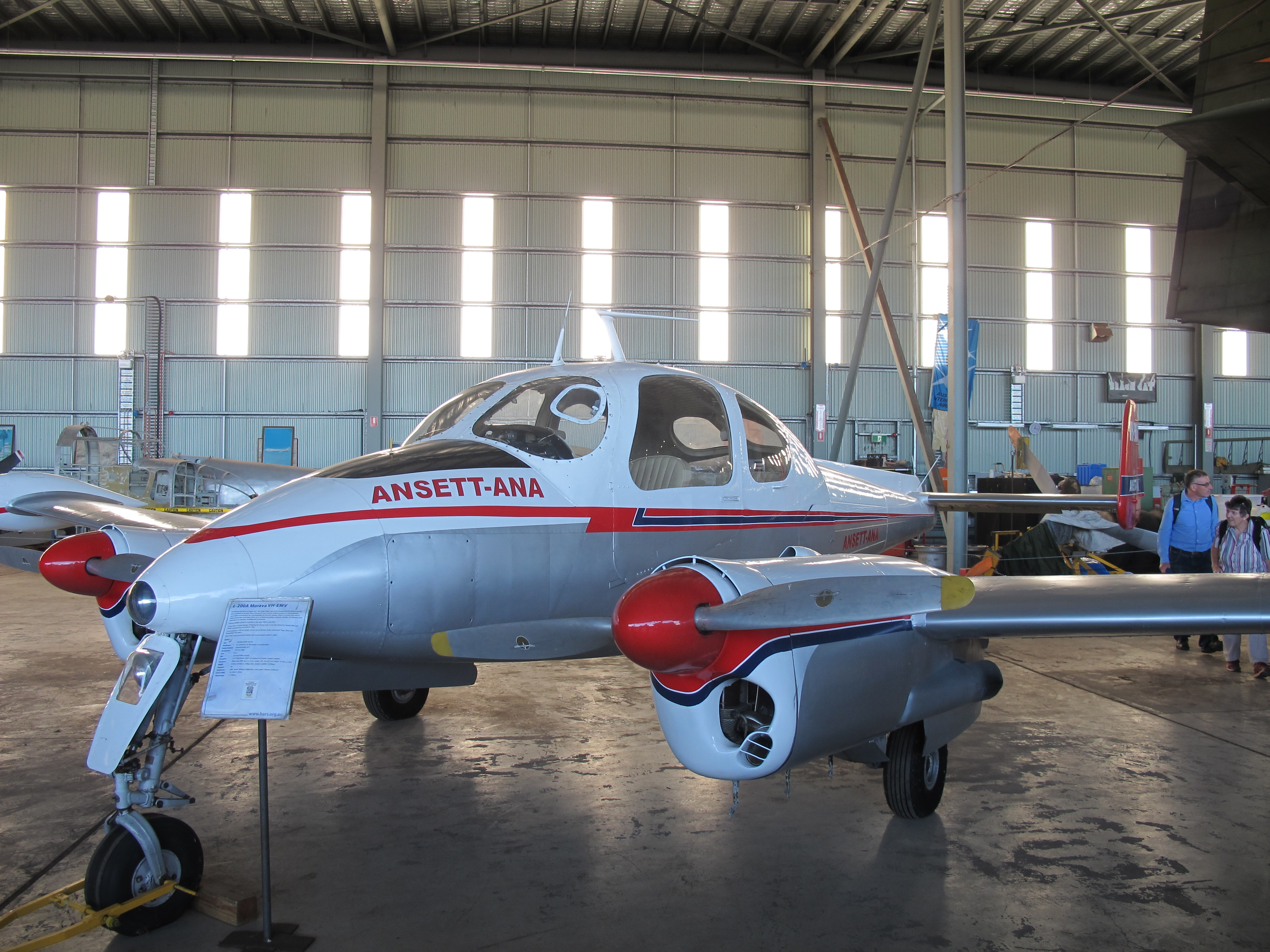
An Ansett ANA LET Morava at the HARS Museum

At various times Ansett Australia and its predecessors, Ansett Airways and Australian National Airways and partnering carriers operated the Boeing 727, −100, −200 Advanced and the purpose-built 727 LR, Bristol Freighter, Cessna 550, Convair 340, Convair 440, de Havilland Dragon, de Havilland Canada DHC-4 Caribou, de Havilland Canada DHC-6 Twin Otter, de Havilland Canada Dash 7, de Havilland Heron, Douglas DC-3 and C-47 Skytrain, Douglas DC-4, Douglas DC-5, Douglas DC-6, Fokker F-27, Fokker F-28, Fokker Universal, Lockheed Model 10 Electra, Lockheed L-188 Electra, LET L-200A Morava, Douglas DC-9, Mohawk 298, Piaggio P.166 and Vickers Viscount.

Ansett Flying Boat Services operated the Consolidated PBY Catalina, Short Sandringham and Short Sunderland.

At various times the Ansett-ANA helicopter division operated the Bell 47J Ranger, Bell 206, Bristol Sycamore, Sikorsky S-61 and Sikorsky HH-52 Seaguard.

Ansett Worldwide Aviation Services owned the Airbus A300, Airbus A310 and Boeing 757 for leasing.

One of the most unusual aircraft that was operated by Ansett was the Aviation Traders ATL-98 Carvair from the 1960s. Three of the airline's own DC-4s were delivered to the United Kingdom for conversion by Aviation Traders Limited, the company run by Sir Freddie Laker as managing director.

Historically, whichever aircraft carried the registration VH-RMA (the initials of Reginald Miles Ansett) was the unofficial flagship of the airline. The code was carried by a Douglas C-47 Skytrain from 1948 to 1956, a Lockheed L-188 Electra from 1959 to 1984 and a Boeing 767-200 (Ansett Worldwide Aviation Services) from 1992 to 1997. The registration VH-RMA was purchased by Tesna Holdings in January 2002 but never used.

== Destinations and routes ==
=== Oceania ===
- Australia
  - Australian Capital Territory
    - Canberra (Canberra Airport)
  - New South Wales
    - Sydney (Sydney Airport)
  - Northern Territory
    - Alice Springs (Alice Springs Airport)
    - Darwin (Darwin International Airport)
    - Ayers Rock (Ayers Rock Airport)
  - Queensland
    - Brisbane (Brisbane Airport)
    - Cairns (Cairns Airport)
    - Gold Coast/Coolangatta (Gold Coast Airport)
    - Hamilton Island (Hamilton Island Airport)
    - Mackay (Mackay Airport)
    - Mount Isa (Mount Isa Airport)
    - Proserpine (Whitsunday Coast Airport)
    - Sunshine Coast/Maroochydore (Sunshine Coast Airport)
    - Townsville (Townsville Airport)
  - South Australia
    - Adelaide (Adelaide Airport)
  - Tasmania
    - Hobart (Hobart Airport)
    - Launceston (Launceston Airport)
  - Victoria
    - Melbourne (Melbourne Airport)
  - Western Australia
    - Argyle (Argyle Airport)
    - Broome (Broome International Airport)
    - Kalgoorlie (Kalgoorlie-Boulder Airport)
    - Karratha/Dampier (Karratha Airport)
    - Kununurra (Kununurra Airport)
    - Newman (Newman Airport)
    - Geraldton (Geraldton Airport)
    - Paraburdoo (Paraburdoo Airport)
    - Perth (Perth)
    - Port Hedland (Port Hedland Airport)
- New Zealand
  - Auckland (Auckland Airport)^{1}
  - Christchurch (Christchurch Airport)
- Fiji
  - Nadi (Nadi International Airport)

=== Asia ===
- Malaysia
  - Kuala Lumpur (Sultan Abdul Aziz Shah Airport) ^{2}
- Indonesia
  - Jakarta (Soekarno–Hatta International Airport) ^{2} and Kemayoran Airport before 1985
  - Denpasar (I Gusti Ngurah Rai International Airport)
- People's Republic of China
  - Shanghai (Shanghai Hongqiao International Airport) ^{2}
- Hong Kong (Hong Kong International Airport) and Kai Tak Airport, British Hong Kong before 1998
- Taiwan
  - Taipei (Taiwan Taoyuan International Airport) (formerly Chiang Kai Shek International Airport) ^{2}
- Japan
  - Osaka (Kansai International Airport)
- South Korea
  - Seoul (Gimpo International Airport) ^{2}

^1: Terminated prior to Air New Zealand takeover. ^2: Terminated during the Asian financial crisis.

=== Star Alliance ===
On 30 March 1999 Ansett Australia joined the Star Alliance, a global network of carriers, opening up interline agreements with a dozen different carriers connecting to over 100 countries across the world. Reciprocal rights for certain Star Alliance membership tiers was offered, including earning frequent flyer points and a wide selection of lounge access. The Star Alliance logo was added to every aircraft in the Ansett fleet, as well as its regional subsidiary airlines. Other Star member carriers like United Airlines benefited greatly by Ansett's membership, with seamless feeder connections from its trans-Pacific services. Membership in the Star Alliance was suspended upon the Ansett Group entering administration. Upon sale to the Tesna Consortium it was planned for the airline to rejoin Star Alliance, however the 4 March shutdown rendered this meaningless.

== Services ==
Ansett Australia offered travellers a range of services up to the time of 14 September 2001:

=== Golden Wing Club ===
Golden Wing Club was the airport lounge service owned and operated by Ansett. Members received a bi-monthly magazine called Travelling Life, as well as many other features. Golden Wing Club Lounges were located throughout Australia in Melbourne, Sydney, Brisbane, Adelaide, Perth, Canberra, Cairns, Hobart, Darwin, Gold Coast, Alice Springs, and Hamilton Island. Ansett also ran international Golden Wing Clubs at Sydney and Perth, with an added "First Class" section of the Sydney Club for those travelling International First Class from 1994 to 1998. Access was available to Golden Wing Club members travelling on an Ansett or subsidiary service (e.g. Kendell, Aeropelican and Skywest) on the day of travel. Complimentary access was granted for Global Rewards Diamond and Sapphire members, as well as Star Alliance Gold (and above) members.

Lounges were for a time, located in Auckland, Hamilton, Wellington and Christchurch with members being able to access all Star Alliance Lounges as well. The lounges initially closed following the appointment of administrators and subsequent grounding of the group in September 2001, however select lounges re-opened in a scaled-back capacity in Melbourne, Sydney, Brisbane, Adelaide and Perth only from November 2001 until March 2002 while Ansett Mark II was operating.

Following Ansett's final flights in March 2002, the lounges permanently closed. In the weeks that followed they were emptied of their expensive artwork and other items of value in subsequent auctions, leaving behind furniture and a variety of fittings, most of which was purchased by the various airport owners who bought the terminals back from Ansett's administrators. Today, many of the former Golden Wing Clubs in Australia live on as new lounges, occupied by Virgin Australia as its member lounge in Melbourne, Sydney and Brisbane, through leases secured with the airport owners. The former Golden Wing in Cairns was used initially by Australian Airlines as a crew training facility followed by Qantas as a temporary Qantas Club while the Cairns terminal underwent redevelopment, before being demolished in the terminal redevelopment. The Perth Golden Wing was used by charter airline Alliance, and then became Virgin's sixth lounge before being vacated in late 2015 when Virgin relocated to the new Domestic T1 terminal. The Canberra Lounge was used by Virgin Blue and eventually closed and demolished to make way for the new Canberra Terminal redevelopment. The Adelaide and Gold Coast lounges have both, in the process of terminal redevelopments, been demolished.

=== Ansett Executive Lounge ===
The Ansett Executive Lounge, also known as "Ansett Pass" and "Ansett Managers Lounge", was an exclusive airport lounge service owned and operated by Ansett. Membership was by invitation only, and offered luxury rivaling that of the world's finest five-star hotels. As membership was quite select, the lounges were significantly smaller than those of Golden Wing Clubs. Executive lounges were located throughout Australia (Melbourne, Sydney, Brisbane, Adelaide, Canberra, and Perth) and New Zealand (Auckland, Wellington, and Christchurch).

These lounges closed at time of administration and did not reopen. In the years since the collapse, many of the former executive lounges were demolished after the airport owners purchased the leasing rights from Ansett's administrators. For a time, regional carrier Regional Express Airlines used the former Canberra lounge as a lounge area for its passengers. Virgin Blue used the former Executive Lounge in Sydney for its initial "Blue Room" and later on "The Lounge" product, but relocated to the former Golden Wing Club lounge in 2008. The former lounges are still in existence in Sydney, Brisbane and Perth, but are now used for other purposes and not accessible to passengers.

=== Global Rewards ===
Global Rewards was Ansett Australia's Frequent Flyer Program from 1991 to 2001. It was formerly known simply as "Ansett Frequent Flyer". Points could be used for services from Ansett Australia and their partners including flights, upgrades, holidays, hotel stays and car rentals. Diners Club was a significant financial services partner in Global Rewards. Points held at the time of the airline's collapse lost their value as no other airline took over the program as had taken place with the collapse of some other airlines.

=== Chauffeur drive ===
Ansett offered a limousine service, for those wishing to hire for journeys to and from the airport to the CBD in Adelaide, Brisbane, Cairns, Melbourne, Perth and Sydney. It also offered airport-to-suburb service in Melbourne, Perth and Sydney.

=== Valet parking ===
Ansett offered a valet parking service in major Australian and New Zealand airports. This also offered the convenience of kerbside check-in, and car cleaning for additional cost.

=== Capital Shuttle ===
Ansett's Capital Shuttle operated between Sydney and Canberra. This service mainly used Saab 340 and Bombardier CRJ–200 aircraft, with small use of A320 and 737 aircraft mostly in peak periods. 'Capital Shuttle' services departed from a specially marked gate at Sydney Airport, Gate 14.

=== Air cargo ===
Also known as Ansett Air Freight during its time, Ansett ran a significant freight operation which specialised in the transport of items too large for normal carriage, along with heavy-freight contracts with numerous suppliers and contractors.

=== Terminal transfers ===
Ansett ran a scheduled terminal transfer service at Sydney Airport, which offered seamless connection from its Domestic terminal to the International terminal for Ansett Australia services connecting to Ansett International. An Ansett bus operated the shuttle service which departed from a transfer lounge located between its two domestic concourses. The shuttle would route across the airside tarmac and runways and arrive near customs at Terminal 1.

== Accidents and incidents ==
- On 17 May 1946, VH–UZP Lockheed 10B Electra "Ansalanta", Essendon to Parafield (Ansett Airways inaugural direct service). Controlled flight into terrain on an instrument approach, aircraft ended inverted – 12 on board survived without serious injury.
- On 18 June 1950, VH–BZK, a Douglas DC-3 was involved in a ground collision with an empty coal train while taxiing. The aircraft collided with the train on the level crossing that existed at the time on Runway 22 at Kingsford-Smith Airport. The DC-3 was severely damaged and the aircraft's first officer received minor injuries, while 5 of the train's coal wagons derailed.
- On 30 November 1961, Ansett-ANA Flight 325, a Vickers Viscount, crashed into Botany Bay shortly after take-off from Kingsford-Smith Airport, Sydney, New South Wales. The starboard wing failed in a thunderstorm. All 15 people on board were killed.
- On 22 September 1966, Ansett-ANA Flight 149, a Vickers Viscount, crashed at Winton, Queensland after a mid-air fire caused structural failure of the port wing. All 24 people on board were killed.
- July 13, 1972: An Ansett Australia Piper PA-31 Navajo aircraft, registered as VH-CIZ, crashed near Golden Grove shortly after departing Adelaide for a charter flight to Moomba Airport. All eight people on board, including the pilot and seven passengers, were killed.
- On 19 October 1994, Ansett Australia Flight 881, a Boeing 747-300 registered as VH–INH, operating Sydney to Osaka, returned and landed at Sydney without the nose wheel extended. Approximately one hour after departure the crew shut down the number one engine because of an oil leak. They returned the aircraft to Sydney where the approach proceeded normally until the landing gear was selected. With selection of the landing gear and selection of the flap beyond a setting of flaps 20, the landing gear warning horn began to sound because the nose landing gear had not extended. The flight crew unsuccessfully attempted to establish the reason for the warning. Believing the gear to be down, the crew elected to complete the landing, with the result that the aircraft was landed with the nose gear retracted. There was no fire and the pilot in command decided not to initiate an emergency evacuation. All 274 passengers and crew were evacuated safely. While repair was done to VH–INH after the incident, the airline leased two 747-400s from its competitor Qantas to cover VH–INH's flights : VH-OJA,City of Canberra, and VH-OJL, City of Ballarat.
- On 19 May 2000, a Boeing 767-200, registered as VH-RMO, suffered a nose wheel collapse at Sydney Terminal during an overnight service. The aircraft was not occupied by passengers or crew at the time.

== Sponsorship ==
=== Sport ===
Ansett Australia was one of the major sponsors of the Australian Football League (AFL), holding the naming rights to the AFL pre-season competition, the Ansett Australia Cup. It was also a major sponsor of Waverley Park, where its logo was visible around the stadium.

Ansett was also a major sponsor of Australian cricket, with the Ansett Australia Test Series (as it was known under naming rights) a prominent fixture of the Australian summer. Ansett's logo (called the StarMark) appeared on all players' training and game shirts, as well as around the boundary and on the field during Test Series.

Ansett was the official airline of the Sydney 2000 Olympic Games. Boeing 767-300 ER VH-BZF carried the Olympic Flame from Athens to Guam for the start of the torch relay through Oceania. An A320–211 carried the Olympic Torch from Auckland to Uluru, to commence the Olympic Torch relay in Australia.

Since Qantas's takeover of Australian Airlines in 1992, Ansett acquired the rights to selective sponsorship of various teams involved in the Australian Touring Car Championship and Seven Networks commentary team between various airports close to racing venues around Australia from 1994 to Ten Network's takeover of V8 Supercar Series AVESCO (V8 Supercars Australia) launched the new series in 1997, but the insignia remained on various cars until Ansett folded in 2001.

It was also the sleeve/major sponsor of the Brisbane Broncos in the National Rugby League (NRL) from 1996 until 2001.

== Related companies ==
=== Ansett Worldwide Aviation Services (AWAS) ===
Ansett Worldwide Aviation Services or simply Ansett Worldwide was one of the world's largest commercial jet aircraft leasing companies. It was Ansett Australia's subsidiary and leasing arm from 1985 until February 2000. AWAS was acquired by Dubai Aerospace Enterprise in 2017.

=== Ansett Flight Simulator Centre / Ansett Aviation Training ===
The Ansett Australia Flight Simulator Centre located in Melbourne had continued trading under administration, following the company's insolvency as it was one of the few Ansett businesses that could operate profitably, independent of the airline. An agreement was reached by the Deed Administrators in October 2004 for its sale to Aviation Training Australasia Pty Ltd. The sale included the business, related buildings, land and the Ansett owned Flight Simulators. Nineteen former Ansett Australia employees jobs were saved in the sale, and Aviation Training Australasia elected to operate the centre under the trading name of Ansett Flight Simulator Centre and later Ansett Aviation Training, dropping the "Australia" off the end of Ansett, but retaining the well recognised Ansett Star Mark logo, reflective of Ansett's last livery.

In April 2008, it announced that it was undergoing a major expansion and will be getting simulators for the current-generation Boeing 737, Fokker 100, Beechcraft King Air and Embraer EMB-120 Brasília, as well as a second Airbus A320 simulator due an extension to centre's existing building.

From 2008 Ansett Aviation Training continued growing to become the biggest Australian Training provider in the Asia Pacific Region, adding D level full flight simulators:

- Airbus A320 I, II & III
- Airbus A320 CEET
- BAe 146
- Boeing 737 Classic
- Dash 8 100/200/300
- Embraer 120
- Fokker 100
- King Air 200
- Metro III/23
- Saab 340

First in its Melbourne hub, later opening new training centres in Milan, at Malpensa Airport (Italy) in 2017 with 4 new simulators:

- Airbus A320
- BAE 146 – Avro rj (DUBLIN)
- Boeing 737-800W
- BOMBARDIER CL–415

Earlier in 2018 in Taipei (Taiwan):

- A320
- ATR-600

And in the second half of 2018 inaugurating in Brisbane (Queensland) its 3 bay simulation new building on the vicinity of the Brisbane International Airport by the Minister for State Development, Manufacturing, Infrastructure and Planning Hon Cameron Dick MP, to accommodate a brand new ATR72-600 TRU simulator, adding in early 2019 a second Fokker 100 full flight simulator, acquiring full certification from CASA (Civil Aviation Safety Australia) to operate both of them :* ATR-600

- Fokker 100
* King Air 350i/200 (Maroochydore)
in 2022, AAT was taken over by Aviation Training Partners, a consortium of Bain Capital, Arcadia Capital, and affiliates of the leadership team of Bridger Aerospace Group.

=== John Holland Aviation Services ===
With the demise of Ansett airline operations in 2002, the engineering services business, formerly known as the Ansett Australia Maintenance Base located at Melbourne Airport, was retained under the name of Ansett Aviation Engineering Services (AAES), primarily to care for the Ansett aircraft held in storage having mandatory ongoing maintenance, and also for other airlines supplying third party maintenance. Through five years of administration, AAES continued to operate despite Ansett Australia no longer trading.

New business was secured and the engineering skills base continued to grow. The AAES business was acquired by the John Holland Group in June 2007 under the banner of John Holland Aviation Services. As part of the sale to John Holland Group, 155 AAES staff and management had the opportunity for ongoing employment.

=== Ansett Aircraft Spares and Services ===
Ansett Aircraft Spares and Services is a company that serves the aviation community by selling aircraft spares as well as maintenance work for airplanes such as Airbus, Boeing, Bombardier, British Aerospace, Douglas aircraft and Fokker types, with offices in Sylmar, California, Hayes, Hillingdon, the United Kingdom, Melbourne, Australia and Istanbul, Turkey. Ansett Aircraft Spares and Services also has a logistics division.

=== List of Ansett Subsidiary Airlines ===
- Kendell Airlines, became a subsidiary in 1990
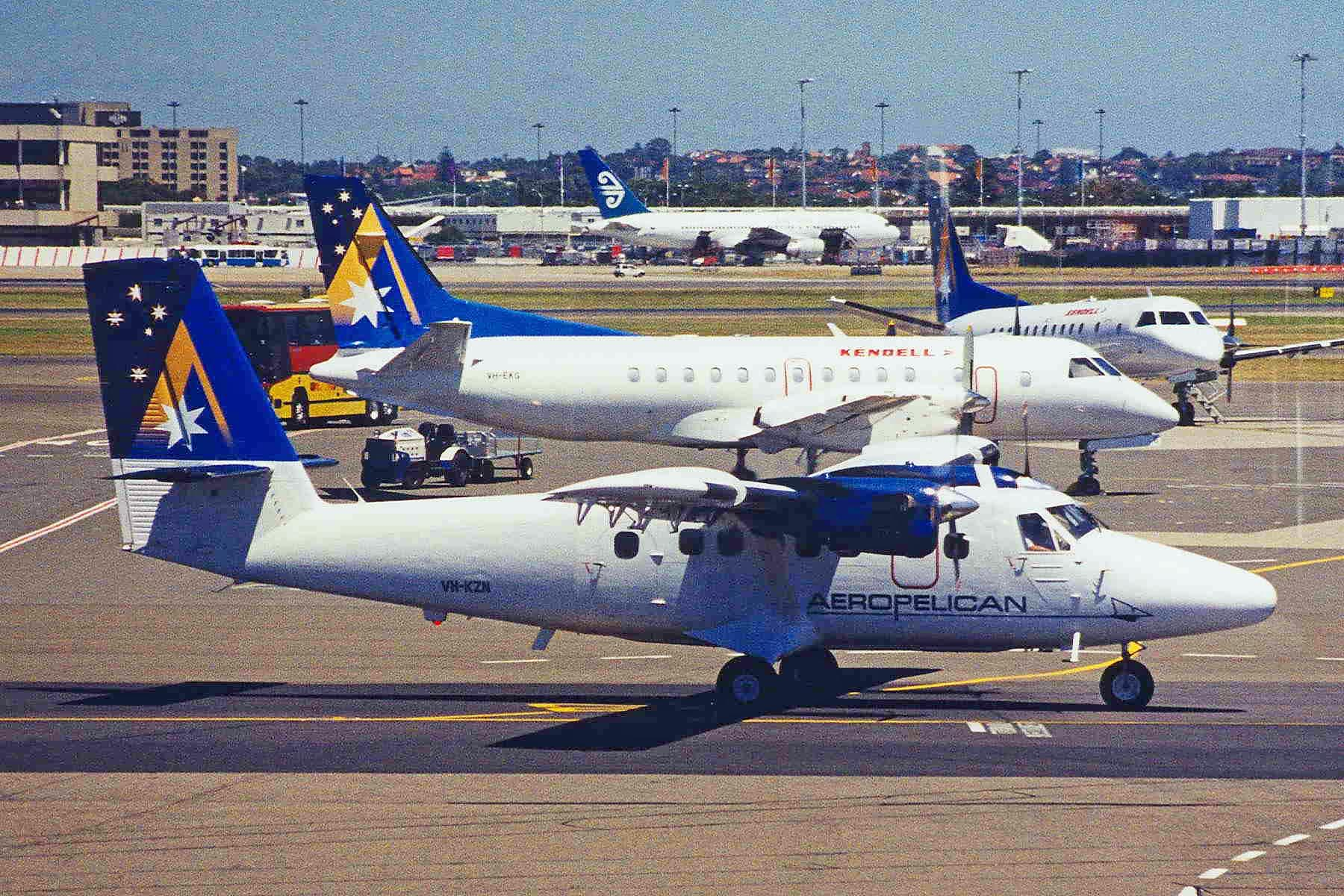
  An Aeropelican Twin Otter 300 in front of two Kendell Saab 340s
- Hazelton Airlines, became subsidiary in 2001

Kendell & Hazelton merged and became Regional Express Airlines after collapse of Ansett Australia.

- Aeropelican, became subsidiary in 1980
- Skywest Airlines, became subsidiary in 1983
- East-West Airlines, became subsidiary in 1993

=== List of associated businesses ===
- Ansett New Zealand, a defunct airline, originally a subsidiary of Ansett Australia
- East-West Airlines, former subsidiary of Ansett Australia ceased October 1993
- Ansett Aviation Engineering Services
- Ansett Aircraft Finance Limited
- Ansett Australia and Air New Zealand Engineering Services
- Ansett Aviation Equipment
- Ansett Equipment Finance
- Ansett Flying Boat Services
- Ansett Pioneer, interstate coach operator
- Ansett Worldwide Aviation Services, an aircraft leasing organisation which used to be a subsidiary of Ansett Australia
- Diners Club Australia, credit card provider. 68.2% share owned, was sold back to Diners Club USA in 1999.
- National Instrument Company (later renamed Ansett Technologies), originally part of ANA, an aircraft instrument and avionics servicing business. Also involved in defence electronics systems integration.
- Austarama Television, which commenced television broadcasting in Melbourne in 1964 as ATV-0 (later ATV-10).
- Universal Telecasters Queensland (TVQ-0 Brisbane), later (TVQ-10), 49.9% was purchased in 1964, with full control gained in 1970.
- Ansair, originally a manufacturer of aircraft seats, the business diversified into bus and coach manufacturing.
- Ansett International Travel
- Transport Industries Insurance

== Ansett Aviation ==
Ansett Aviation is a Helicopter training flight school, with operations in Western Australia, Tasmania and Queensland. While run by a member of the Ansett family, it is not connected to the defunct national airline. It is run by the grandson of Reginald Ansett, Will Richards. Originally called Marine Helicopter Charters, Richards later changed the name to continue the family legacy. It is the only Ansett Air related business run still run by a member of the Ansett family. It uses the old logo of the airline, from the 1970s. The company was started by Richards in 2003.

While similarly named, the company is not connected to Ansett Aviation Training. It has the intellectual property rights to use the original Ansett Logo, through the family. This operation only flies helicopters, including pilot training The company has taken over some traditional flights originally operated by flying boats on the Queensland coast.

== Legacy ==
The Ansett Transport Museum is housed in the company's first aircraft hangar at Hamilton.

== In popular culture ==
- Australian band Client Liaison reference Ansett in several of their retro themed music videos.
- Australian artist Lee Kernaghan references Ansett Australia in the 2012 song Flying With The King.

== See also ==
- Air Niugini
- Ansett New Zealand
- Kendell Airlines
- Transport in Australia
- List of defunct airlines of Australia
- Aviation in Australia
- Bob Ansett
