= Ansett New Zealand =

New Zealand airline

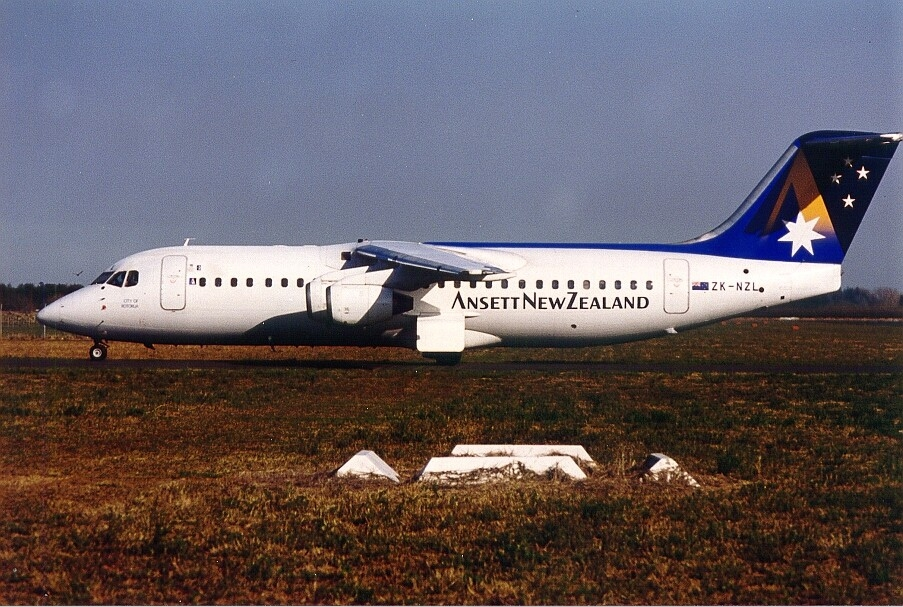
- Ansett New Zealand BAe 146-300 in 1996
IATA	ICAO	Call sign
ZQ	NZA	ANZA
- Commenced operations: 1 February 1987
- Ceased operations: 20 April 2001
- Operating bases: Auckland; Christchurch
- Frequent-flyer program: Star Alliance (Ansett; 1999–2000); Oneworld (Qantas; 2000–2001)
- Parent company: Ansett Transport Industries
- Website: www.ansett.co.nz www.qantas.co.nz

Ansett New Zealand was an airline serving the New Zealand domestic market between 1987 and 2001. It was a subsidiary of Ansett Transport Industries. In order to comply with regulatory requirements relating to the acquisition of Ansett Transit Industries by Air New Zealand, Ansett New Zealand was sold to News Corporation and later rebranded as Tasman Pacific Airlines in 2000, operating as a Qantas franchise under the Qantas New Zealand brand. In 2001 it was placed in receivership and later liquidated.

== History ==
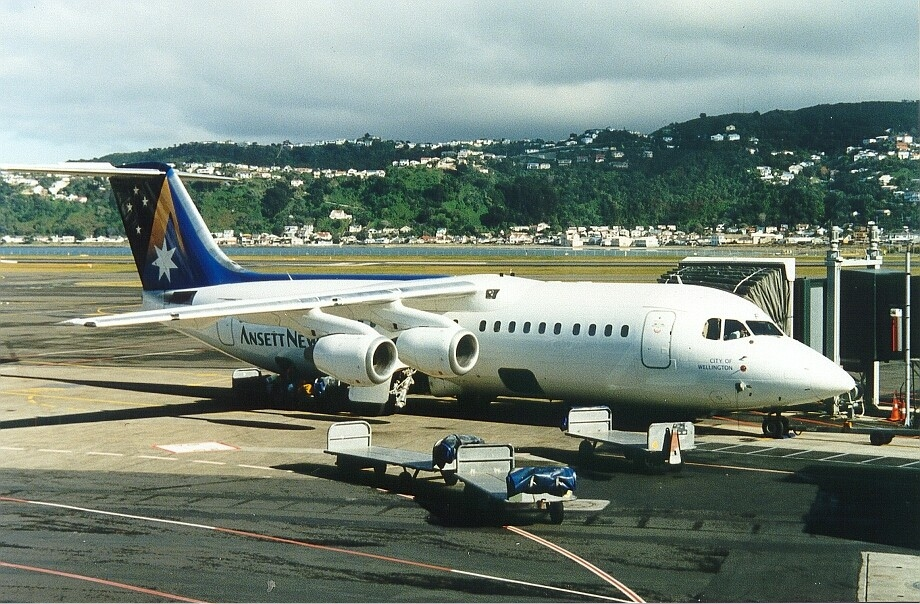
Ansett New Zealand British Aerospace 146 at Wellington, August 1999

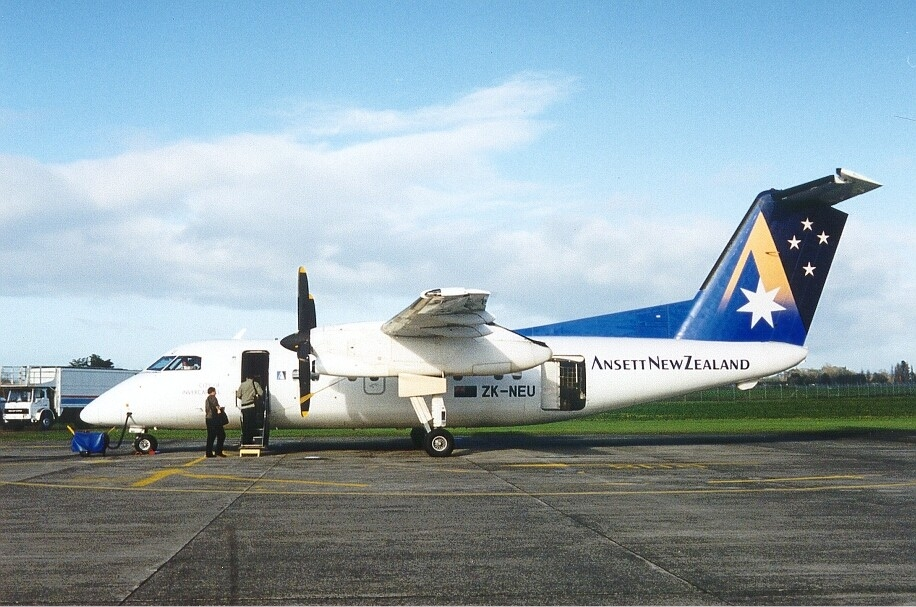
Ansett New Zealand Bombardier Dash 8 at Hamilton, July 2000

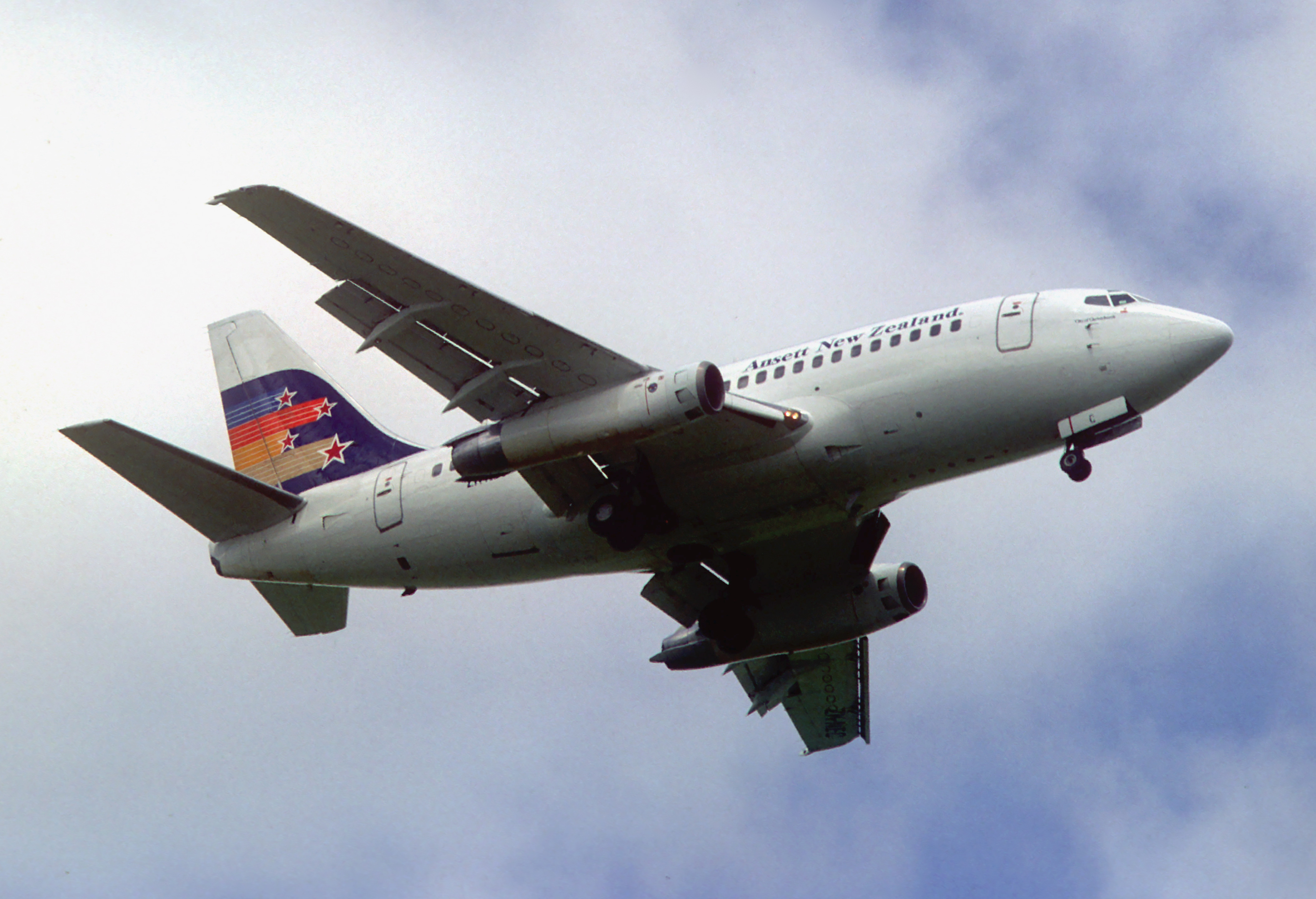
Ansett New Zealand Boeing 737-100, November 1988

Ansett New Zealand was the result of Ansett Transport Industries's desire to expand into the New Zealand market, enabled by the relaxation of regulation in the aviation sector by the fourth Labour government. Ansett Transport Industries formed a partnership with two New Zealand companies, Brierley Investments and Newmans Coach Lines, the latter being a tourism company which owned the unprofitable Newmans Air. Newmans Air formed the basis for a new expanded airline, the company being Bilmans Management Limited, operating as Ansett New Zealand. Half its shares (the maximum allowed for a foreign company) were owned by Ansett, with Brierley holding 27.5% and Newmans holding 22.5%. Subsequently, regulations were relaxed still further, and Ansett took full ownership in April 1988.

Operations started on 25 July 1987 with three Boeing 737-100 aircraft between Auckland, Wellington and Christchurch. The ex Newmans Air de Havilland Canada Dash 7s were used on tourist routes between Auckland, Rotorua, Christchurch, Mount Cook and Queenstown. The old and noisy Boeing 737 aircraft were replaced with new and quieter British Aerospace 146s known as "Whisper Jets". Routes were extended to Dunedin and Invercargill. Also the old Dash-7s were replaced with the much more fuel efficient Bombardier Dash 8s. By the year 2000 the fleet had risen to eight BAE-146s (one a quick change version to convert to freighter operations) and five Dash-8s.

During the early 1990s, Ansett New Zealand created television advertisements emphasising the airline's customer service. One advert featured a businessman (played by Peter Hambleton) who accidentally brought his cat Fluffy to the airport; the Ansett gate agent subsequently takes Fluffy off the businessman's hands and arranges for the cat to be taken home. The advert was voted the best by public vote in the 1992 Fair Go Ad Awards.

In 1996, Air New Zealand made a bid to purchase half of Ansett Transport Industries, after an open skies agreement for the former to fly within Australia was abruptly withdrawn. Anti-monopoly regulators did not want Air New Zealand to gain control of Ansett's operations in New Zealand, however, and it was therefore required that the two Ansett airlines would be separated. Ansett would be owned by Air New Zealand, while Ansett New Zealand would be owned by News Corporation. The transaction was concluded on 1 October 1996.

In June 2000, News Corporation sold Ansett New Zealand to Tasman Pacific Airlines that was owned by a group of investors including Alan Gibbs, Cliff Skeggs and RM Williams. Shortly afterwards, the company became a franchise of Qantas, operating under the Qantas New Zealand brand. In April 2001 the airline was placed in receivership. With Qantas terminating the franchisee agreement and repossessing its aircraft, Qantas New Zealand was liquidated. Qantas would return to the New Zealand domestic market but not through a franchise agreement.

== Fleet ==
- 12 British Aerospace 146s; including 2 -200, 1 200QC, 6 300, and 3 -300A
- 2 Dash 7 (inherited from Newmans Air)
- 9 Bombardier Dash 8; including 7 -102 and 2 -311
- 5 Boeing 737–130
- 5 Embraer EMB 110 Bandeirante (operated by Rex Aviation as Tranzair and later Ansett regional scheduled services, ended by 1999 and replaced by Jetstream)
- 5 BAe Jetstream 32EP (operated by Rex Aviation and Air National as Ansett regional)

== Destinations ==
Prior to the suspension of domestic passenger services, the airline operated services to the following destinations:

Destination	Country	IATA	ICAO	Airport
Auckland	New Zealand	AKL	NZAA	Auckland Airport
Blenheim	New Zealand	BHE	NZWB	Woodbourne Airport
Christchurch	New Zealand	CHC	NZCH	Christchurch Airport
Dunedin	New Zealand	DUD	NZDN	Dunedin Airport
Hamilton	New Zealand	HLZ	NZHN	Hamilton Airport
Invercargill	New Zealand	IVC	NZNV	Invercargill Airport
Milford Sound	New Zealand	MFN	NZMF	Milford Sound Airport
Nelson	New Zealand	NSN	NZNS	Nelson Airport
Palmerston North	New Zealand	PMR	NZPM	Palmerston North Airport
Queenstown	New Zealand	ZQN	NZQN	Queenstown Airport
Rotorua	New Zealand	ROT	NZRO	Rotorua Airport
Te Anau	New Zealand	TEU	NZMO	Te Anau Airport
Whakatāne	New Zealand	WHK	NZWK	Whakatāne Airport
Whangārei	New Zealand	WRE	NZWR	Whangarei Airport
Wellington	New Zealand	WLG	NZWN	Wellington Airport

== Accidents ==
- Ansett New Zealand's first accident involved a BAe 146–200 that ran off the end of the runway at Queenstown Airport on 28 April 1990. However the aircraft only suffered minor damage.
- Ansett New Zealand Flight 703 was an Ansett New Zealand scheduled passenger transport flight from Auckland to Palmerston North. On 9 June 1995, the Dash 8 aircraft flying this route crashed into the Tararua Ranges, 16 km east of Palmerston North Airport. During an instrument approach in inclement weather, the plane's right landing gear jammed in the retracted position and the pilots failed to monitor the flight path while carrying out the alternate gear extension procedure. The flight attendant and three passengers died as a result of the crash.
