= Newmans Air =

Domestic airline of New Zealand (1985–1987)

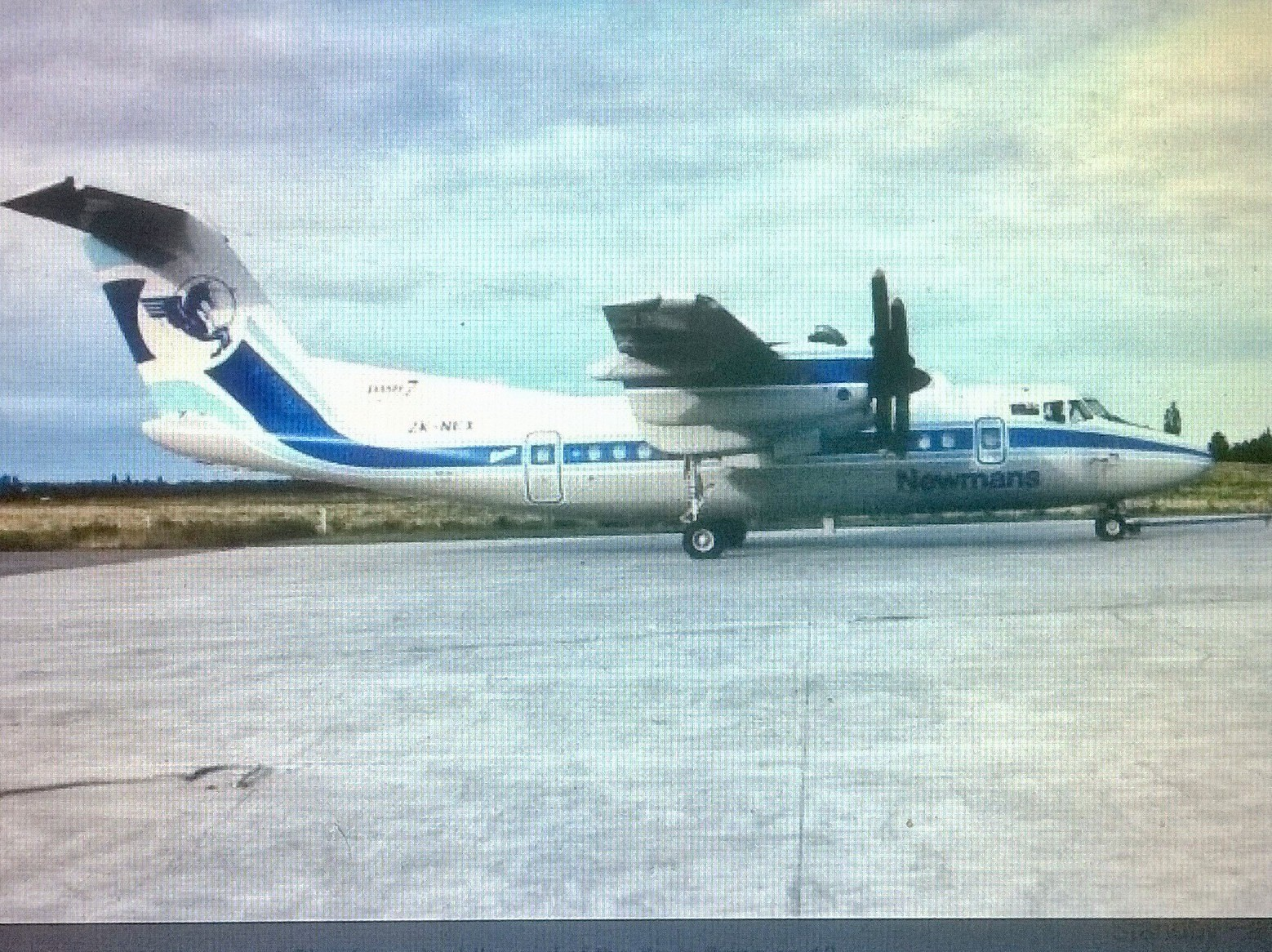
- Newmans Air Dash-7 at Christchurch Airport, 1984
IATA	ICAO	Call sign
ZQ	NZA	ANZA
- Founded: 1 June 1984
- Commenced operations: 13 February 1985
- Ceased operations: 26 December 1986 (rebranded as Ansett Newmans)
- Operating bases: Christchurch Airport
- Fleet size: 4
- Destinations: Ashburton, Auckland, Rotorua, Christchurch, Mount Cook-Glentanner, Queenstown
- Parent company: Newmans Group
- Headquarters: Christchurch

Newmans Airways Limited, trading as Newmans Air, was a wholly owned airline subsidiary of Newmans Group (most well known as the owners of Newmans Coach Lines) and served the New Zealand domestic market between 1985 and 1987. It was set up in direct competition with Mount Cook Airline to serve tourist routes. In 1986, Ansett Australia purchased a 50% shareholding, increasing this to 100% in 1987 when the airline was rebranded Ansett New Zealand.

== Establishment ==
In 1983 Newmans Group launched a takeover bid for competing tourist company, Mount Cook Group, which was then still independently owned. Their reasons for wishing to buy the airline were to make more revenue from overseas passengers, instead of simply feeding them to Mount Cook's air operation. They also claimed that Mount Cook's HS 748 aircraft were no longer up to the standards expected by overseas tourists with Newmans intending to re-equip their airline with either De Havilland Canada Dash 7 or BAe 146s.

After their failed attempt, Newmans decided to set up their own competing airline, operating the same tourist routes operated by Mount Cook Airline, but excluding Northland. The airline was launched in only 9 months, with launch celebrations at Rotorua Airport on 12 February 1985.

== Operation ==
Services began on 13 February 1985 after a launch celebration in Rotorua the day before. There were three flights a day between Christchurch and Queenstown, two between Christchurch and Rotorua and a single midday flight from Rotorua to Auckland. Stops at Glentanner were added to the Queenstown flights a few months later.

Newmans Air chose to start operations using DHC-7, although only Glentanner actually required an aircraft with short takeoff and landing (STOL) capabilities. Newmans Air planned to move these aircraft into a feeder role serving Wanaka, Te Anau and the West Coast once traffic had built up sufficiently on the 'trunk' services to allow DC9 or BAe 146 aircraft. Newmans also stated intentions to include Nelson (where Newmans Group was based) in its network using a third leased DHC-7, but neither of these plans eventuated.

== Ansett Investment ==
Ansett Australia had long held a desire to enter the New Zealand aviation market, and indeed between 1960 and 1966 it held a shareholding in South Pacific Airlines of New Zealand. The relaxation of regulation in the aviation sector in 1986 by the fourth Labour government allowed Ansett to take joint ownership of Newmans Air with a 50% share, along with NZ investment company Brierley Investments (27.5% shareholding). The remaining shares were kept by Newmans Group.

The resultant company was known as Bilmans Management Ltd, trading as Ansett Newmans. Two new de Havilland Canada Dash 8-100 aircraft were ordered (ZK-NEY and ZK-NEZ) with a view to flying between Auckland, Wellington and Christchurch, with the first aircraft arriving in December 1986. The DHC-7 aircraft were sold by 30 January 1987 having been replaced. However, in 1987 Ansett purchased the remaining shares in the company and in mid 1987 it relaunched the airline as Ansett New Zealand.

== Fleet ==
Aircraft	Total	Introduced	Retired	Notes
De Havilland Canada Dash 7	2	1985	1987	ZK-NEW, named "Uenuku" (Rainbow) & ZK-NEX, named "Kopako" (Guardian of the Heavens).
De Havilland Canada Dash 8-100	2	1986	1987	ZK-NEY & ZK-NEZ

== Interline agreements ==
During its brief existence as a separate company, Newmans Air established an interline agreement with Te Anau-based Waterwings Airways for transfer of passengers at Queenstown. Waterwings Airways was established three years earlier, having taken over Mount Cook Airlines loss-making Te Anau floatplane service. This interline continued after the Ansett buyout.

== See also ==
- Ansett New Zealand
- List of defunct airlines of New Zealand
- History of aviation in New Zealand
