= Hazelton =

Hazelton may refer to:

== Places ==
=== Canada ===
- Hazelton, British Columbia
- Hazelton Mountains, British Columbia

=== United States ===
- Hazelton, Idaho
- Hazelton, Kansas
- Hazelton, New Jersey
- Hazelton, North Dakota
- Hazelton (Youngstown, Ohio)
- Hazelton, West Virginia
- United States Penitentiary, Hazelton, a federal prison in West Virginia

== Other uses ==
- Hazelton (sternwheeler), a British Columbian vessel
- Hazelton Airlines, a former regional airline in Australia

== People with the given name ==
- Hazelton Nicholl (1882–1956), British military officer
- Hazelton Spencer (1757–1813), Canadian soldier, political figure, and judge

== People with the surname ==
- Charlie Hazelton (1917–1985), Australian rugby league footballer
- Donald F. Hazelton (died 2012), American politician from Florida
- Edwin Hazelton (1861–1916), English cricketer
- George Cochrane Hazelton (1832–1922), American politician from Wisconsin
- Gerry Whiting Hazelton (1829–1920), American politician from Wisconsin
- Jim Hazelton (1931–2014), Australian aviator, co-founder of Hazelton Airlines
- John W. Hazelton (1814–1878), American politician from New Jersey
- Joseph Hazelton (1853–1936), American actor
- Marc Hazelton (born 1980), English cricketer
- Mary Brewster Hazelton (1868–1953), American painter
- Max Hazelton (1927–2023), Australian aviator, co-founder of Hazelton Airlines
- Porter Hazelton (1812–1870), American politician from Michigan
- Rebecca Hazelton (born 1978), American poet, editor, and critic
- Ron Hazelton (born 1942), American television host
- Scottie Hazelton (born 1973), American football coach
- Terra Hazelton, Canadian musician, broadcaster, and actress
- Vidal Hazelton (born 1988), American football player
- Wyndham Hazelton (1894–1958), English cricketer

== See also ==
- Hazelton Township (disambiguation)
- New Hazelton
- Hazleton (disambiguation)
- Haselton, a surname
