= Kenneth William Thomas =

Australian entrepreneur

- Born: 15 June 1913; Harden, New South Wales, Australia
- Died: 21 September 1997 (aged 84); Orange, New South Wales, Australia
- Known for: Founder of Thomas Nationwide Transport
- Spouse: Anne Jean Muriel Mackinnon
- Children: 5

Kenneth William Thomas was an Australian transportation magnate best known for founding the transport company Thomas Nationwide Transport.

== Early life ==
Thomas was born in Harden, New South Wales to engine driver Arthur Picton Thomas and Elizabeth (née McLeod). He was the fifth of six children. He began his education at Murrumburrah Superior Public School. After the family moved to Sydney in 1924 he attended Fort Street Boys’ High School. He started working as a bank clerk at age 15. He attended the University of Sydney where he graduated with a Bachelor of Arts in 1936 and a Bachelor of Economics in 1940. In 1939 he married stenographer Anne Jean Muriel Mackinnon. Thomas worked various jobs after graduating such as a schoolteacher, station-hand, salesman, and shop assistant.

== Career ==
In 1946 while Thomas was working as a clerk for Standard Telephones and Cables he established Australia's largest transport group called Thomas Nationwide Transport. The company started with a single driver who Thomas paid to deliver timber from Wyong, New South Wales to Sydney. At weekends Thomas drove the truck himself usually carrying garden soil from the banks of the Lane Cove River. In 1967 Thomas merged his company with Sir Peter Abeles's Alltrans group to form the mega trucking company TNT-Alltrans.

== Later life ==
In 1971 he led a successful campaign to make seatbelt-wearing compulsory in New South Wales. After being forced to resign as the chairman of TNT in 1972 due to religious comments he made at a university Thomas suffered huge financial losses. In 1979 he established the Save a Life a Day group with the aim of reducing road fatalities. The group convinced the NSW government to implement compulsory licence suspension and jail sentences for drink-driving offences. He ran as an independent candidate in the 1981 state election but was unsuccessful. Thomas passed away in Orange, New South Wales in 1997. He was posthumously inducted into the Shell Rimula Wall of Fame in 2012.
