= East-West Airlines (Australia) =

Regional airline of Australia (1947–1993)

IATA	ICAO	Call sign
EW	EWA	EASTWEST
- Founded: 23 June 1947
- Ceased operations: 31 December 1993
- Parent company: Ansett Transport Industries
- Headquarters: Tamworth, New South Wales, Australia
- Key people: Bryan Grey

East-West Airlines was an Australian regional airline founded in Tamworth, New South Wales in 1947. It operated to major regional city-centres and connected these centres to various state capitals, and by the 1980s it was Australia's third largest domestic airline. It was sold to Ansett Transport Industries in 1987 with the brand retired in 1993.

== History ==
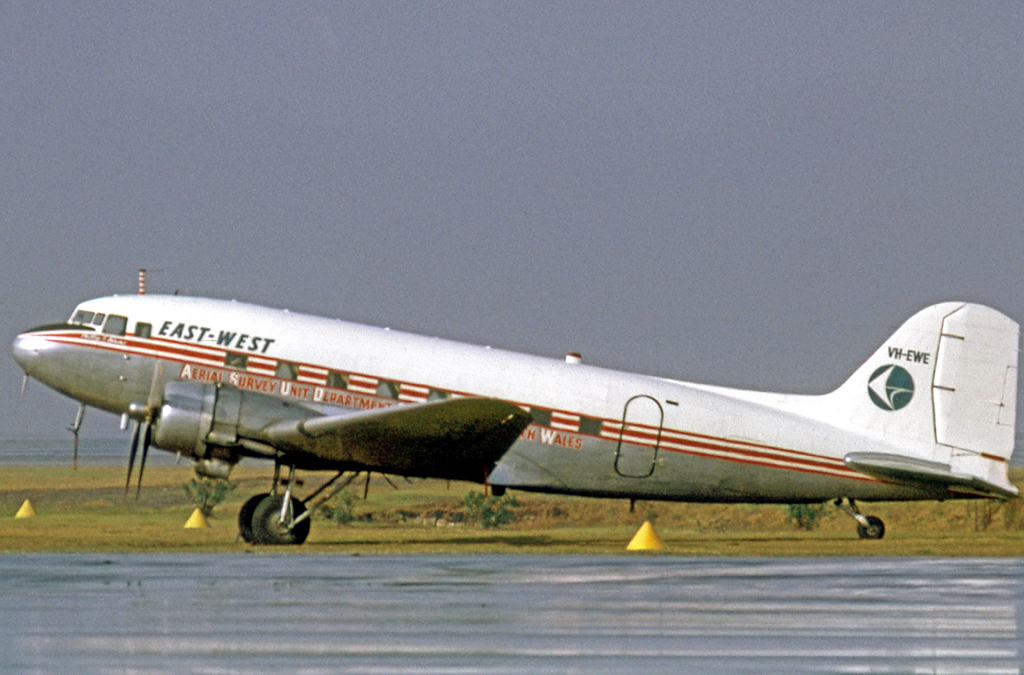
Douglas DC-3 at Sydney Airport in 1970

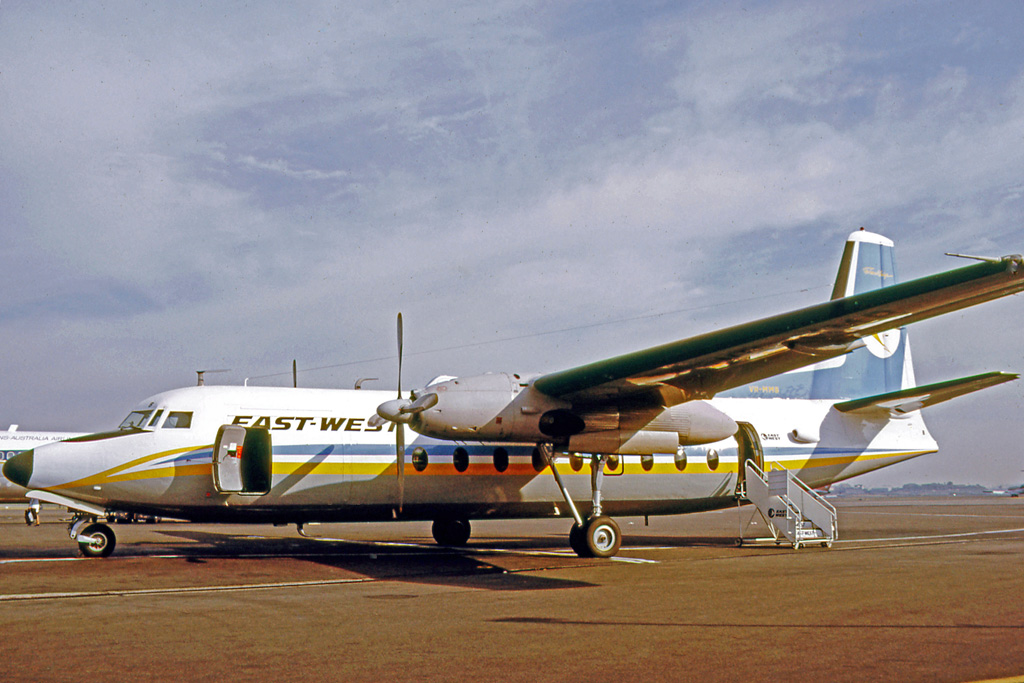
Fokker F27 at Sydney Airport in April 1971

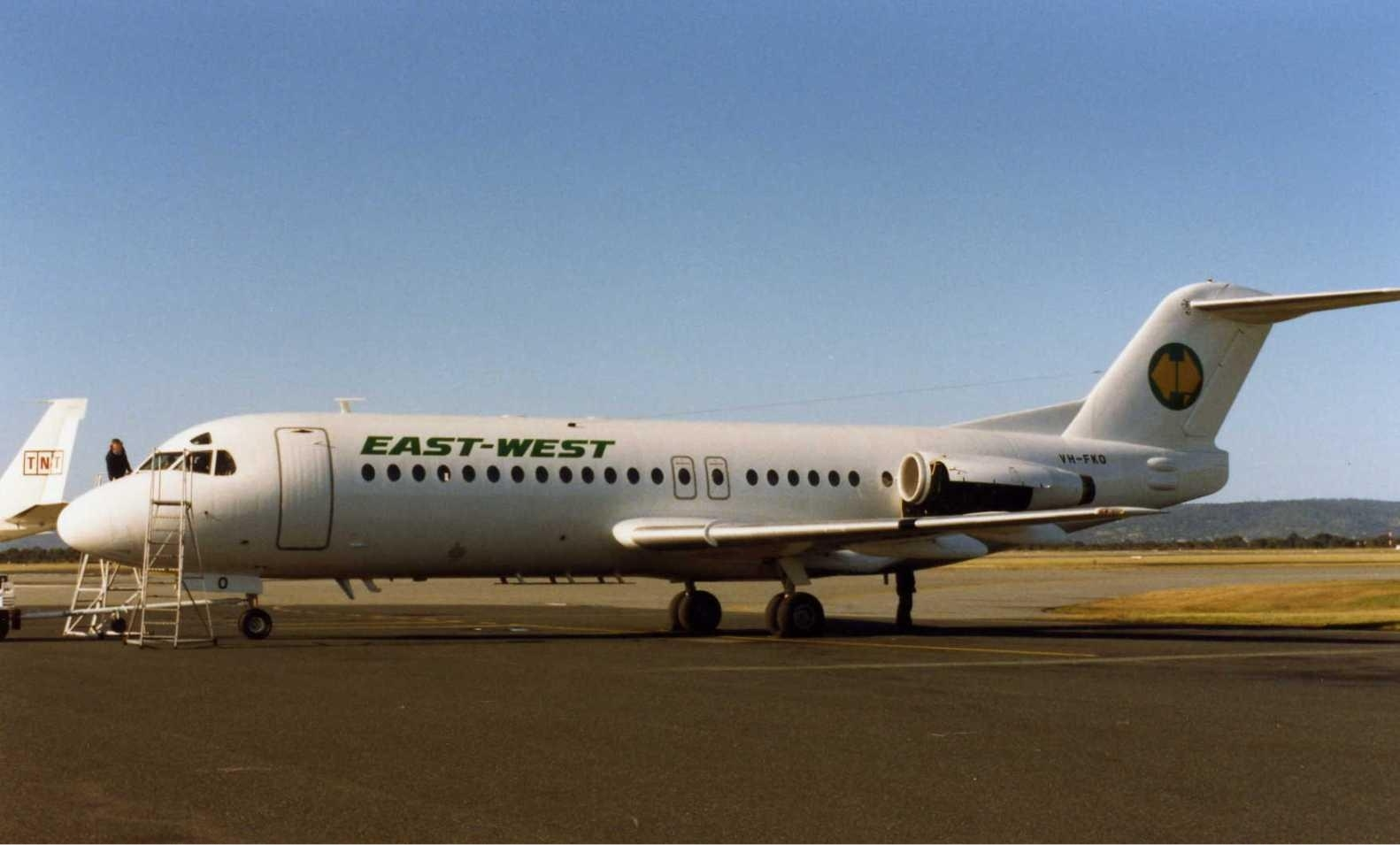
Fokker F28 at Perth Airport

East-West Airlines was founded in 1947 with funds raised from about 800 mainly small investors with the aim to "fight the city based airline monopolies" and traded forthwith as an unlisted public company. At this early time, the workforce consisted of the manager who was Basil Brown, and the maintenance engineer and workshop manager, who was Cedric Wood. Wood was an exceptional aircraft engineer, having an unblemished maintenance record, despite having nine separate aircraft maintenance licences to his name (Wooden "A' licence, Propeller overhaul licence, Horizonal and radial engine overhaul and supercharger licences, Airframe overhaul licence and Instrument fitting licence, Magnaflux certification licence, Helicopter overhaul licence). Cedric Wood had many aircraft varieties to service. Cedric's talent enabled the company to operate maintenance procedures on a 'shoe string' budget. Initially, using single-engine de Havilland Tiger Moth aircraft, East-West established Australia's first regular mail delivery service between Tamworth, Port Maquarie and Newcastle. The company bought twin-engine Avro Anson multi-role aircraft which allowed it to carry more mail and passengers.

East-West acquired several Douglas DC-3s starting in 1953 and these 28-seat aircraft steadily replaced the smaller Avro Ansons in operating scheduled services throughout New South Wales. The last example was disposed in 1973 having latterly been operated on research flights into cloud seeding systems for the CSIRO. In August 1953 East-West merged with South Coast Airways although South Coast officially became a subsidiary company and continued under its own name until going into administration in 1965.

In 1965 Kwikasair made an unsuccessful take over offer for the company. In 1969, East-West was granted permission to extend its Sydney to Albury service to Melbourne. In 1977 a maintenance facility opened at Tamworth Airport.

It grew in the following years from an intrastate operator to Australia's third largest domestic carrier which owned by 1982 ten Fokker aircraft. By that time East-West was also about to acquire its first jet aircraft. It was however still reeling from a venture into the Northern Territory in 1980, which incurred heavy losses. This caused also a falling out among board members. East-West, already in 1981 in an era still governed by the Two Airlines Policy, became the first "third" carrier operating between Sydney and Canberra. Between March 1977 and 1990 it operated services to Norfolk Island.

In 1982 former Ansett and Air Niugini executive Bryan Grey, in partnership with former Citicorp Australia merchant banking executive Duke Minks, formed East-West Development Pty Ltd with the specific purpose to acquire East-West Airlines. With a loan of $ 8.5 million from the Nauru Phosphate Royalties Trust they purchased East-West in a share buy-out. The take over was deemed controversial, as discussions queried how far the involvement of Nauruan capital constituted a quasi foreign takeover.

In the following years East-West competed vigorously with major airlines Ansett and Trans Australia Airlines on inter-capital routes. The Australian aviation industry was highly regulated at the time under the Two Airlines Policy, which prevented East-West from flying directly between major capital cities, so it instead offered services between major cities via regional centres. Routes included Melbourne to Sydney via Albury and Sydney to Brisbane via Newcastle and Coolangatta, sometimes making touch-and-go landings at intermediate locations.

East-West primarily flew Fokker F27 turboprops and Fokker F28 jets. In June 1983 East-West sold return tickets between Sydney and Melbourne via Albury, which took about two hours 45 minutes, for $120, which was about half of the standard fare of $248 for direct flights by the duopoly carriers taking one hour 15 minutes. However, Ansett and Trans Australia Airlines also offered discounted fares down to around $140. According to Brian Grey the service attracted about 4,000 customers per month. In 1985 a Boeing 737 was ordered.

Because of its operating structure, East-West was able to significantly undercut other airlines. Their aggressive "Third Airline" campaign forced the Federal Government to eventually scrap the Two Airline Policy, which had kept Australian air fares seemingly inflated for many years.

Managing Director Bryan Grey along with marketing consultant John Williams created a massive nationwide media campaign and thus attracted many first-time flyers with what could be described as Australia's first truly discounted fares in a now deregulated arena. East-West set the scene for other airlines to enter the Australian domestic market years later. In December 1983 East-West was sold to Perth based Skywest Airlines owned by Ric Stowe. In particular the Government of New South Wales opposed the deal. Former owner Bryan Grey formed Compass Airlines in 1990 as first entrant into a then-deregulated domestic aviation market.

Under the new ownership East-West was retained as an independent entity. Skywest Holdings announced in May 1985 it planned to merge both Skywest Airlines and East-West, but this was not carried out except for some harmonisation of timetables. In 1985 East-West challenged the Two Airline Policy in the Federal Court.

In July 1987 East-West and Skywest were sold to Perth car dealer Perron Group which sold them on by the end of the month to Ansett Transport Industries. It continued to operate as a separate entity until 31 December 1993 when its operations were integrated with those of Ansett and the East-West name ceased to be used.

Having closed in 1991, the maintenance facility at Tamworth Airport was converted to a bus body factory by fellow Ansett subsidiary Ansair in 1993.

== Accidents and incidents ==
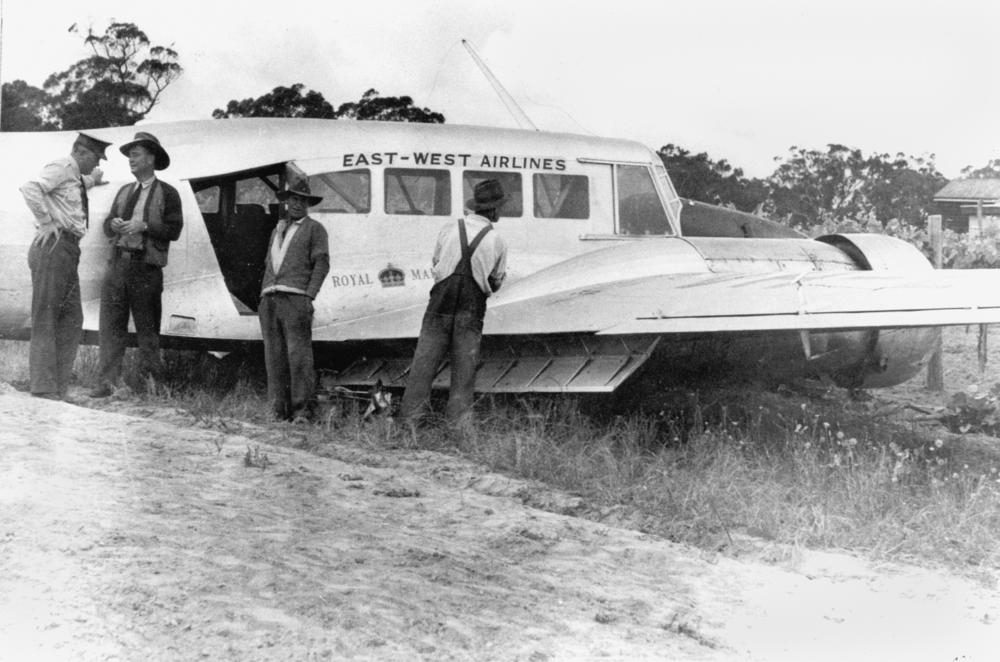
Avro Anson crash at Pozieres, Queensland, 1950

- On Wednesday 12 October 1949 an East-West Airlines Avro Anson plane crashed just after taking off from Tamworth. Four passengers escaped injury. The pilot, Captain John Lachlan Rentell, 35, had his right foot partly severed at the ankle, sustained internal injuries and deep wounds to the face and arms. He avoided a tree by turning the machine into a steep bank, headed north-west towards his best clearance and then turning south put the plane down. Aerodrome mechanics observed that the engines sounded sluggish and did not appear to be picking-up properly.
- On 5 December 1950, an East-West Airlines Avro Anson crashed at Zanatta's property in Pozieres, in the Southern Downs Region, Queensland. The plane was en route from Eagle Farm Airport (Brisbane) to Armidale Airport when one engine caught fire, filling the cockpit with smoke. The aircraft suffered extensive damage on impact, although the pilot and two passengers were unharmed.
- On 4 November 1957, an East-West Douglas DC-3 with 27 people on board took off from Sydney Airport en route to Tamworth Airport. When the aircraft reached a height of 61 metres (200 feet), the No.1 engine began to backfire and lose power. The pilot tried to shut down the faulty engine, but mistakenly shut down the working No.2 engine. The pilot tried to return to the airport for an emergency landing, but the plane had lost too much height. It crashed into a lake approximately 3 km (1.9 mi) north of the airport, with a depth of 4 metres (13 feet) of water, 46 metres (151 feet) from the nearest bank. All 27 people on board survived.
- On 31 May 1974, a Fokker F27 departed Orange Airport and was making a nighttime approach to Bathurst Airport in turbulent and rainy conditions. Just before reaching the runway threshold, at an altitude of approximately 67 metres (220 feet), the pilots realised the aircraft had drifted too far to the left of the runway centre line to make a safe landing, so they decided to initiate a go-around. However, the aircraft encountered a sudden downdraft, and due to its altitude being too low to effect a recovery, the rear fuselage impacted the ground heavily, just outside the boundary of the flight strip. The aircraft slid 625 metres (2,051 feet) along the ground, ripping the starboard engine off the wing. The passengers and crew evacuated the aircraft, and all survived.

== Fleet ==
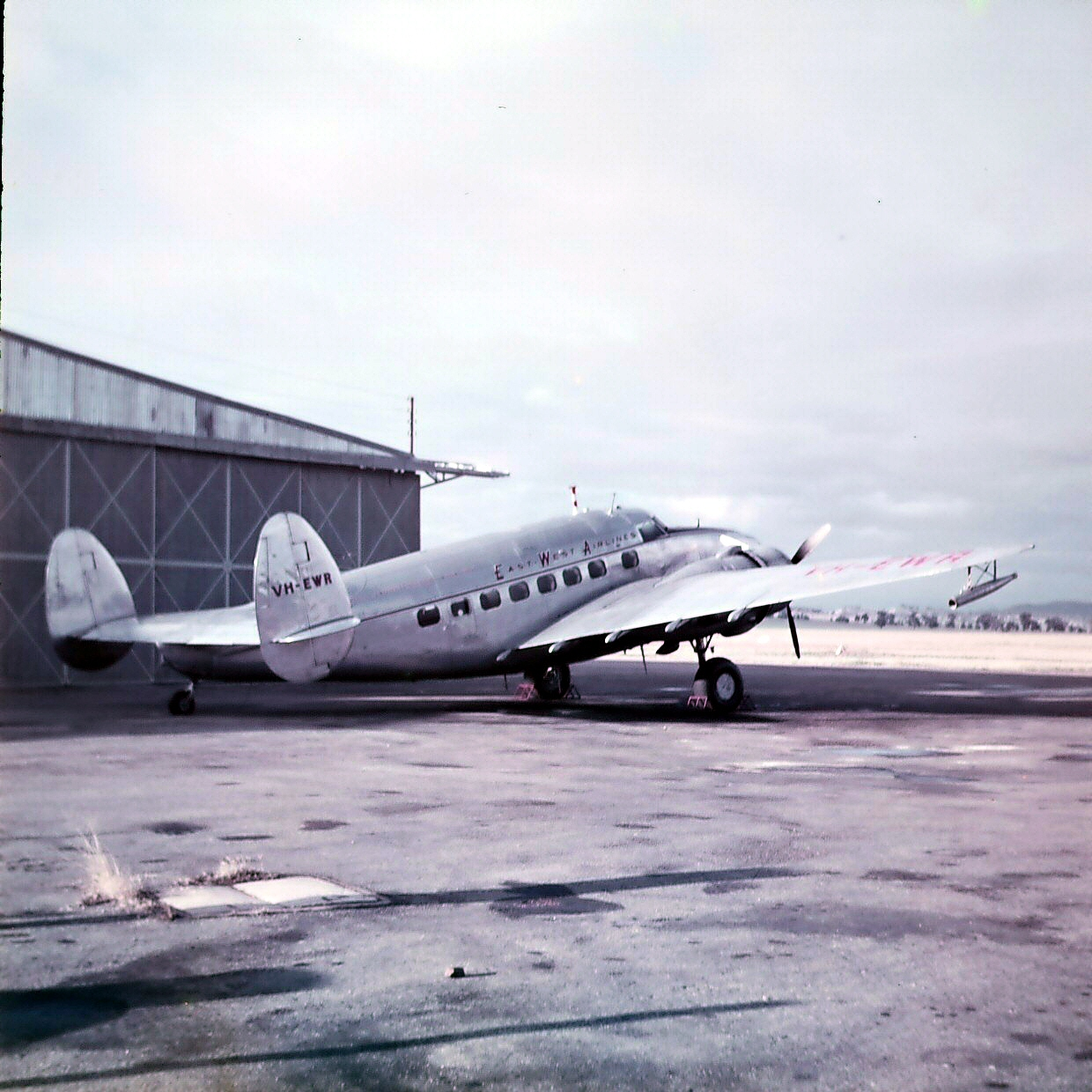
East-West Airlines Lockheed Hudson converted for civil operations at Wagga Wagga Airport, used for CSIRO Cloud Seeding experiments in 1958

- 3 Lockheed Hudson (converted into civil transports)
- 8 Douglas DC-3
- 20 Fokker F27
- 8 Fokker F28
- 2 Boeing 727-200
- 1 de Havilland Canada DHC-6 Twin Otter
- 8 BAe 146-300

== Bibliography ==
- Gradidge, Jennifer M., The Douglas DC-1, DC-2, DC-3 - The First Seventy Years Volume 1, Air-Britain, Tonbridge Kent, 2006, ISBN 0-85130-332-3
