= Sunshine Express =

Sunshine Express may refer to:

- Sunshine Express (organisation), brand name of the Australian Railway Historical Society's Queensland Division (ARHS QLD)
- Sunshine Express (train), otherwise known as The Sunlander, in Queensland
- Sunshine Express Airlines
