= Bathurst Airport =

Bathurst Airport may refer to:

- Bathurst Airport (New South Wales) in Bathurst, New South Wales, Australia (IATA: BHS, ICAO: YBTH)
- Bathurst Airport (New Brunswick) in Bathurst, New Brunswick, Canada (IATA: ZBF, ICAO: CZBF)
