= Hazleton =

Hazleton may refer to:

== Places ==
=== England ===
- Hazleton, Gloucestershire, a village in Gloucestershire, England
  - Hazleton long barrows, Neolithic burial mounds at Hazleton, Gloucestershire, England
  - Hazleton Abbey, a medieval abbey in Hazleton, Gloucestershire, England

=== United States ===
- Hazleton, Indiana, a town
- Hazleton, Iowa, a city
- Hazleton, Michigan, a township
- Hazleton, Missouri, a ghost town
- Hazleton, Pennsylvania, a city

== Other uses ==
- Hazleton Laboratories Corporation, a defunct American contract research organization; see Fortrea
- Hazleton (EP), a 1998 EP by Fuel
- Hazleton Hawks, team in the U.S. Eastern Professional Basketball League, 1956–1962
- Hazleton Mountaineers, team in the U.S. Eastern Professional Basketball League, 1951–1952
- Hazleton Red Sox, U.S. minor league baseball team
- USS Hazleton (SP-1770), a United States Navy patrol boat in commission from August to December 1918
- Hazleton massacre, Lattimer massacre

== See also ==
- Hazelton (disambiguation)
