= Sunshine Express Airlines =

Air charter company

IATA	ICAO	Call sign
CQ	EXL	-
- Founded: October 1998
- Fleet size: 3
- Destinations: Brisbane, Biloela, Coffs Harbour, Port Macquarie, Hervey Bay, Maryborough, Sunshine Coast, Tamworth, Armidale.
- Headquarters: Sunshine Coast Airport, Mudjimba, Queensland, Australia
- Key people: Steve Padgett
- Website: sunshineexpress.com.au

Sunshine Express Airlines is an air charter company that previously operated as an airline serving many regional destinations on the East Coast of Australia, from Hervey Bay to Port Macquarie. It is one of the major employers at the airport. Its head office is in Sunshine Coast Airport, Mudjimba.

Sunshine Express ceased all scheduled operations at the end of September 2006 and has decided to concentrate on charter operations.

== History ==
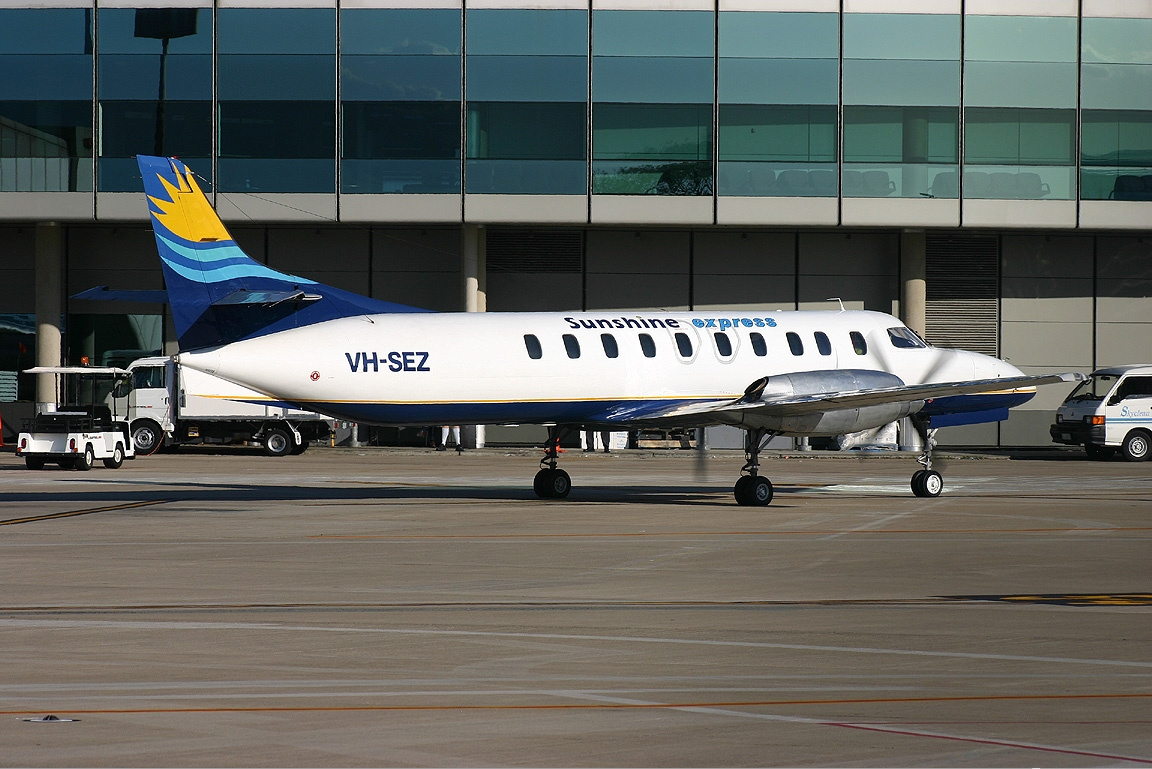
Sunshine Express Metro at Brisbane Airport

Established in October 1998, Sunshine Express Airlines was founded by one of Australia's aviation leaders, Steve Padgett, to serve many regional routes, mainly out of the Sunshine Coast. It started operations on 25 October 1998. Aeromil, also founded by Steve Padgett, is Sunshine Express' parent company and also has a base at Sunshine Coast Airport.

In their first year, Sunshine Express carried over 24,000 passengers between just two destinations and today carries almost 100,000 passengers. Prior to closure of its scheduled routes, Sunshine Express employed over 40 people and was a Qantas partner airline.

== Destinations ==
Although based on the Sunshine Coast, the majority of its services were from/to Brisbane.

The operated routes were (before 1 October 2006):

- Brisbane - Biloela
- Brisbane - Coffs Harbour - Port Macquarie
- Brisbane - Hervey Bay
- Brisbane - Maryborough
- Brisbane - Tamworth - Armidale

Sunshine Express ceased all scheduled flights from 1 October 2006 to focus on charter operations. Hervey Bay and Biloela are now served by QantasLink. Coffs Harbour is now served by Brindabella Airlines. Port Macquarie was served by Brindabella Airlines but this service was discontinued at the end of 2010. Virgin Australia now serve this route. From May 2009 Tamworth is now served by Brindabella Airlines and from August 2011 Armidale was served by Brindabella Airlines this has been suspended. Maryborough no longer has direct air service to Brisbane.

== Fleet ==
As of August 2006 the Sunshine Express Airlines fleet includes:

- 1 Fairchild Metro 23
- 2 Fairchild Metro III

== See also ==
- List of defunct airlines of Australia
- Aviation in Australia
