= Kwikasair =

Defunct Australian logistics company

- Industry: Logistics
- Founded: 1958
- Headquarters: Australia
- Parent: Thomas Nationwide Transport

Kwikasair was an Australian logistics company. It was established in 1958 taking over the business of Collier Garland. In 1965 it made an unsuccessful bid for East-West Airlines. In 1968 it was purchased by Thomas Nationwide Transport (TNT).

In 1971 Kwikasair expanded into Canada after DS Scott Transport was purchased and rebranded Kwikasair Canada. In October 1973 it commenced operating in Europe with a London to Paris service. By this stage TNT owned 60%, Hambros Bank 20% and Banque Worms 20%.

By September 1974 it had expanded into Belgium, Switzerland and Iran. In 1988 Kwikasair diversified into direct marketing with the acquisition of Garvey Direct Marketing.

The trademark was cancelled by TNT Express in 2019.
