= Toogong =

Toogong New South Wales
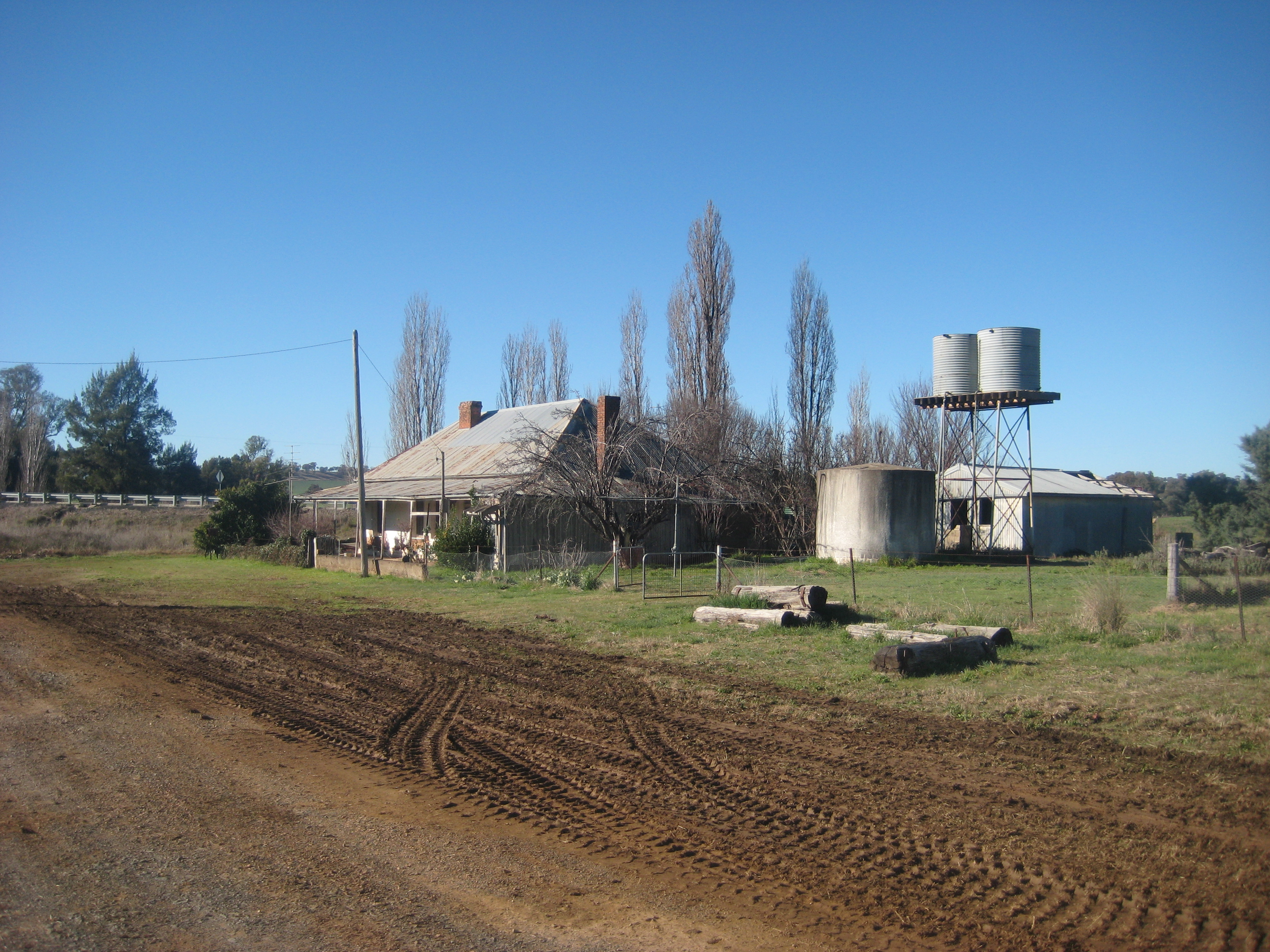
- The former hotel and post office at Toogong

- Coordinates: 33°33′0″S 148°59′0″E
- Population: 71 (SAL 2021)
- Postcode(s): 2864
- Location: 300 km (186 mi) W of Sydney; 50 km (31 mi) W of Orange; 65 km (40 mi) E of Forbes
- LGA(s): Cabonne Shire Council
- State electorate(s): Orange
- Federal division(s): Calare

Toogong is a town in the Central West region of New South Wales, Australia. The town is located in the Cabonne Shire local government area, 300 kilometres (186 mi) west of the state capital, Sydney. At the 2006 census, Toogong had a population of 370. By 2016 this number had fallen to 79.

Toogong is an aboriginal word meaning 'Dried up Lake.'

Toogong was the birthplace of Hazelton Airlines, formed by Jim and Max Hazelton in 1953, now Rex Airlines.

Built in 1872, St. Albans Anglican church in Toogong is the oldest still existing church in the Canowindra district and National Trust listed. The church was built with the financial support of the Irvine family who had emigrated to Australia from Northern Ireland and had built an inn and post office at Toogong in 1863. Apart from being a house of worship it was also used for schooling. The two remaining Irvine brothers of the original five also erected a war memorial in the church grounds in 1924 to honour the men from the district who saw active war service.

A school was operated at Toogong from 1922 to 1967 in a dedicated school house, now disused but still preserved.

Toogong was once a stop for the Cobb & Co stagecoach service from Orange to Forbes.
