= Orange Airport =

Orange Regional Airport
- IATA: OAG; ICAO: YORG

Summary
- Airport type: Public
- Owner: Orange City Council
- Operator: Orange City Council
- Serves: Orange, New South Wales, Australia
- Location: Huntley / Spring Hill
- Elevation AMSL: 3,115 ft (949 m)
- Coordinates: 33°22′54″S 149°07′59″E
- Website: https://www.orange.nsw.gov.au/orange-regional-airport

Map
- Location in New South Wales

Runways
Direction	Length		Surface
Direction	m	ft	Surface
11/29	2,213	7,260	Asphalt
04/22	964	3,163	Grass & red clay
- Sources: Australian AIP and aerodrome chart

Orange Regional Airport (IATA: OAG, ICAO: YORG) is located in the Central Tablelands region of New South Wales between the city of Orange and the town of Blayney. It is located in the area known as Huntley, near Spring Hill and approximately 11 km (6.8 mi) from Orange's business district.

== Facilities ==
At an elevation of 3,115 ft (949 m) above sea level, the airport is Australia's third-highest airport, behind Mount Hotham Airport and Armidale Airport. It has two runways: 11/29 with an asphalt surface measuring 2,213 m × 30 m (7,260 ft × 98 ft) and 04/22 with a grassed red clay surface measuring 783 m × 30 m (2,569 ft × 98 ft). In April 1976, it became the first airport in Australia to have a pilot-controlled lighting system installed.

== Terminal upgrade and airport extension ==
As part of a larger upgrade to the airport, the old terminal building was closed on 21 September 2013 and demolished in the following weeks. Construction of the new terminal was estimated to cost A$3.3 million. A two-year project to extend the airport's main runway by 538 metres (1,765 feet) commenced around the same time, and was completed in 2015.

In August 2014, the airport's new terminal opened, which featured dedicated departures and arrivals areas; room for facilities for three airlines; a cafe and a conveyor belt system. The new terminal did not include a security screening point, limiting regular use by aircraft with over 50 seats.

Additionally, the terminal has secured long term car parking (which is currently free), free unsecured long term parking, and short term/drop off parking.

== Airlines and destinations ==
Airlines	Destinations
Link Airways	Brisbane, Melbourne
QantasLink	Sydney
Rex Airlines	Sydney (ended 25 October 2026)

== Other airport users ==
=== Orange Aero Club ===
Originally established in the 1930s, the Orange Aero Club is a social and flying club based at the airport. The club hosts regular flying competitions and fly-aways from its new building, the Max Hazelton Aero Centre, named after the founder of Hazelton Airlines.

=== Flight training ===
There are a small number of flying schools based at the airport accommodating training in both fixed-wing and rotary-wing aircraft.

== Statistics ==
Orange Airport was ranked 49th in Australia for the number of revenue passengers served in financial year 2024–2025.

Annual passenger and aircraft statistics for Orange
Year	Revenue passengers	Aircraft movements
2015-16	49,471	2,390
2016-17	56,183	2,496
2017-18	70,364	3,318
2018-19	79,720	3,701
2019-20	60,830	2,959
2020-21	35,990	2,315
2021-22	46,980	2,770
2022-23	92,841	4,771
2023-24	99,332	4,888
2024-25	99,737	4,751

== See also ==
- List of airports in New South Wales
