= Link Airways =

Australian airline

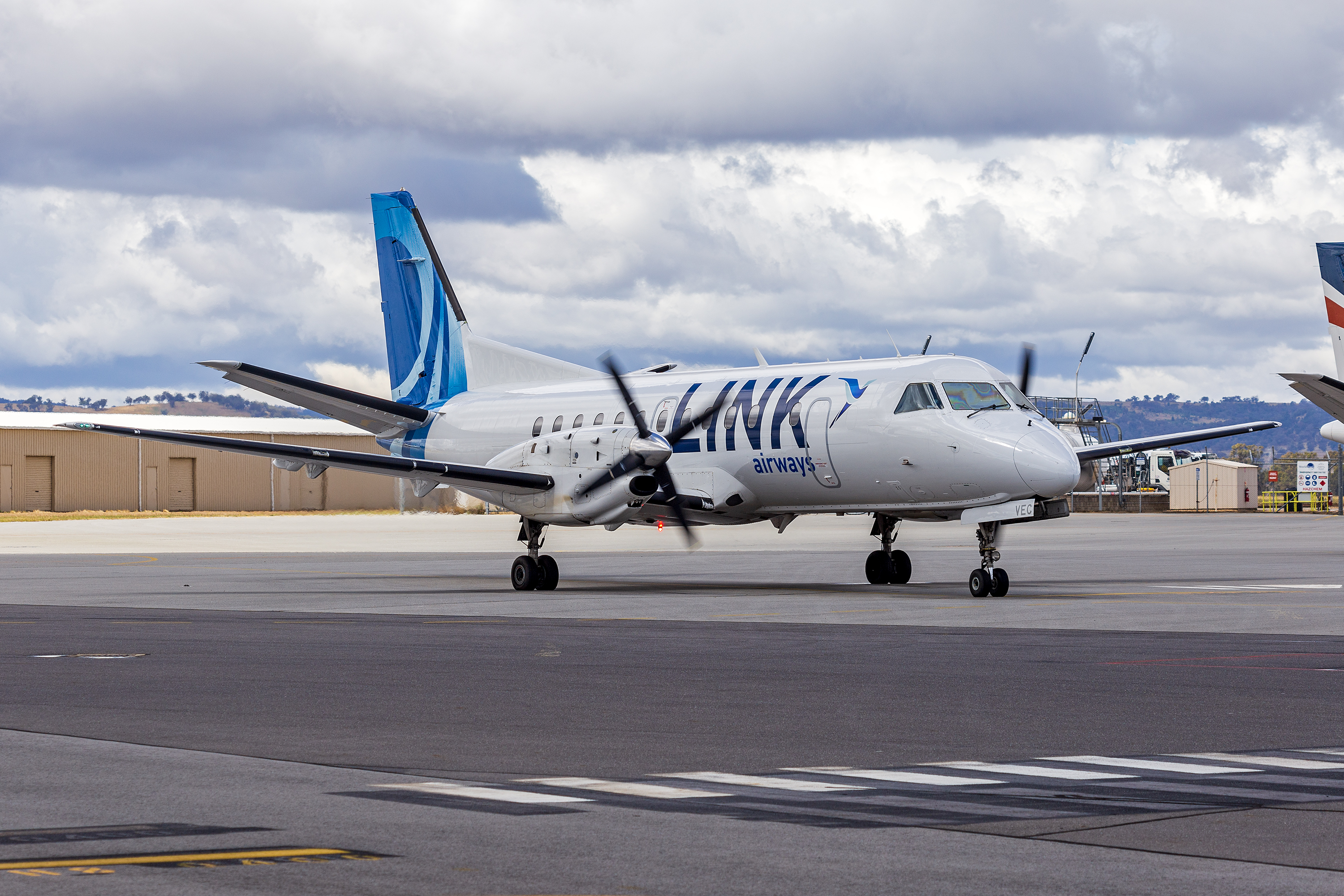
- Link Airways Saab 340B
IATA	ICAO	Call sign
FC	FCA	LINKAIR
- Founded: 2016
- Frequent-flyer program: Velocity Frequent Flyer
- Fleet size: 18
- Destinations: 17
- Parent company: Corporate Air
- Headquarters: Fyshwick, Australian Capital Territory
- Key people: Andrew Major (CEO); Andrew Webb (COO)
- Website: www.linkairways.com

Vee H Aviation Pty Ltd, operating as Link Airways, formerly known as Fly Corporate, is an Australian regional airline based at Brisbane Airport, Queensland. The airline operates scheduled regional passenger services in Queensland, New South Wales, Victoria, Tasmania and the Australian Capital Territory. Link Airways operates a fleet of Saab 340B Plus and Fairchild Metro 23 turboprop aircraft.

== Overview ==
Launching in 2016 under the Fly Corporate brand, the airline was established by parent company Corporate Air, an air charter company that has been operating since 1972, to fly scheduled air services. The airline bases its aircraft at Brisbane Airport and Canberra Airport, from where it operates to regional destinations across Queensland, New South Wales, Victoria, and Tasmania. It has its own heavy maintenance facility at Goulburn Airport in New South Wales.

== History ==
The first scheduled route announced under the Fly Corporate brand was from Brisbane to Coffs Harbour. During 2016, more routes were added from Brisbane to major centres in the New England and North West Slopes regions of New South Wales. The airline used a mixture of four Saab 340s and two Metroliners to serve this network.

In September 2018, the airline successfully tendered to operate flights from Wollongong to Brisbane and Essendon in Melbourne, restoring both the city's air links that were lost when the previous carrier JetGo collapsed in June of that year. Fly Corporate also began operating other former JetGo routes including to Orange and Dubbo from Essendon.

On 11 August 2020 the company rebranded from Fly Corporate to Link Airways.

In October 2020, Link Airways announced that it would begin scheduled flights between Canberra and Hobart (6 days per week) as well as Canberra and Newcastle (11 times per week). On 30 January 2022 Link Airways commenced operating flights for Virgin Australia on the Sydney to Canberra route under a wet lease arrangement.

On 18 January 2024, Virgin Australia announced it would codeshare with Link on 17 regional routes, including ten destinations from Brisbane, three from Melbourne and two each from Canberra and Sydney. In the lead up to this announcement, Link Airways moved its Melbourne terminal from Essendon to Tullamarine on 7 January.

== Fleet ==
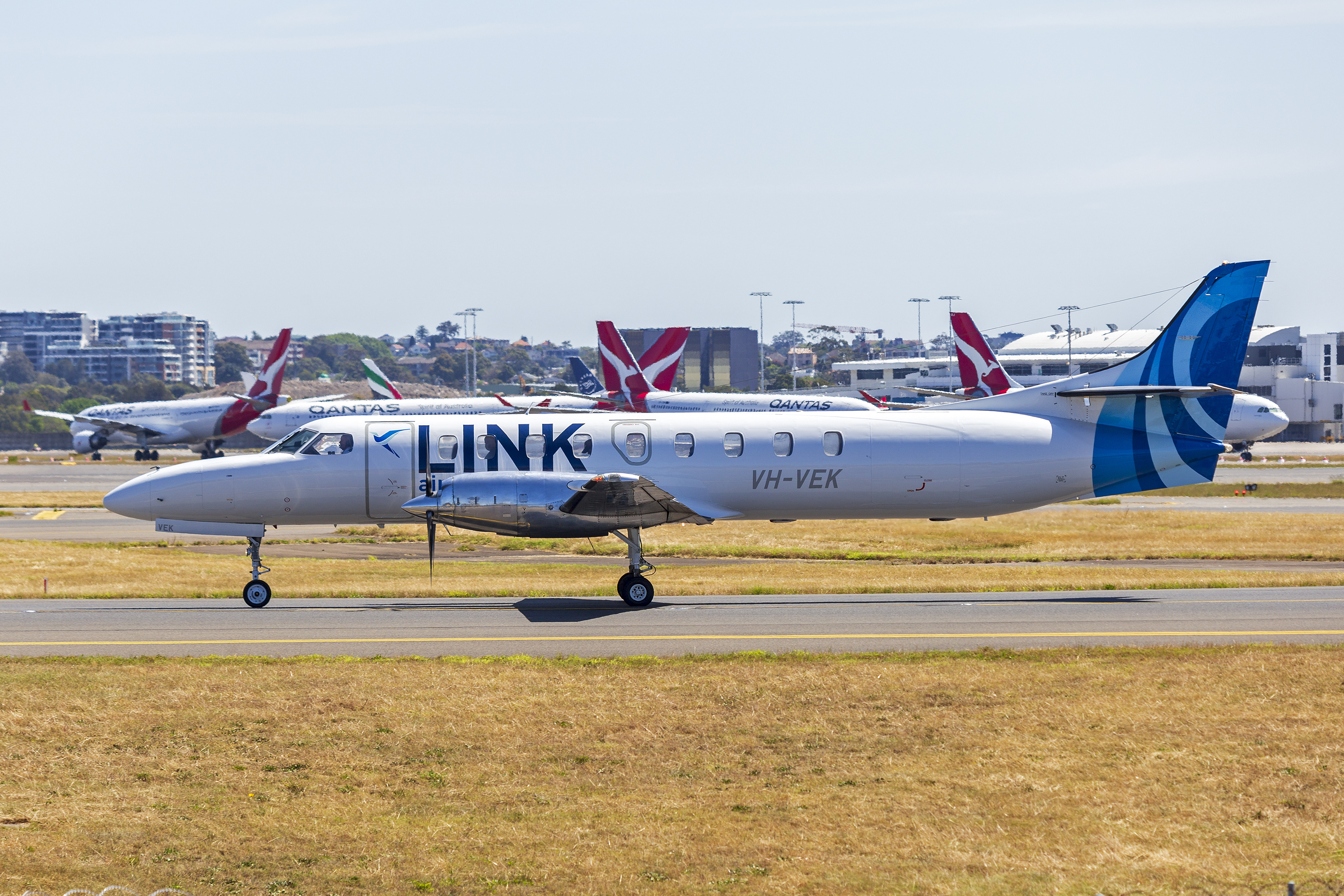
Link Airways Fairchild Metro 23, 2020

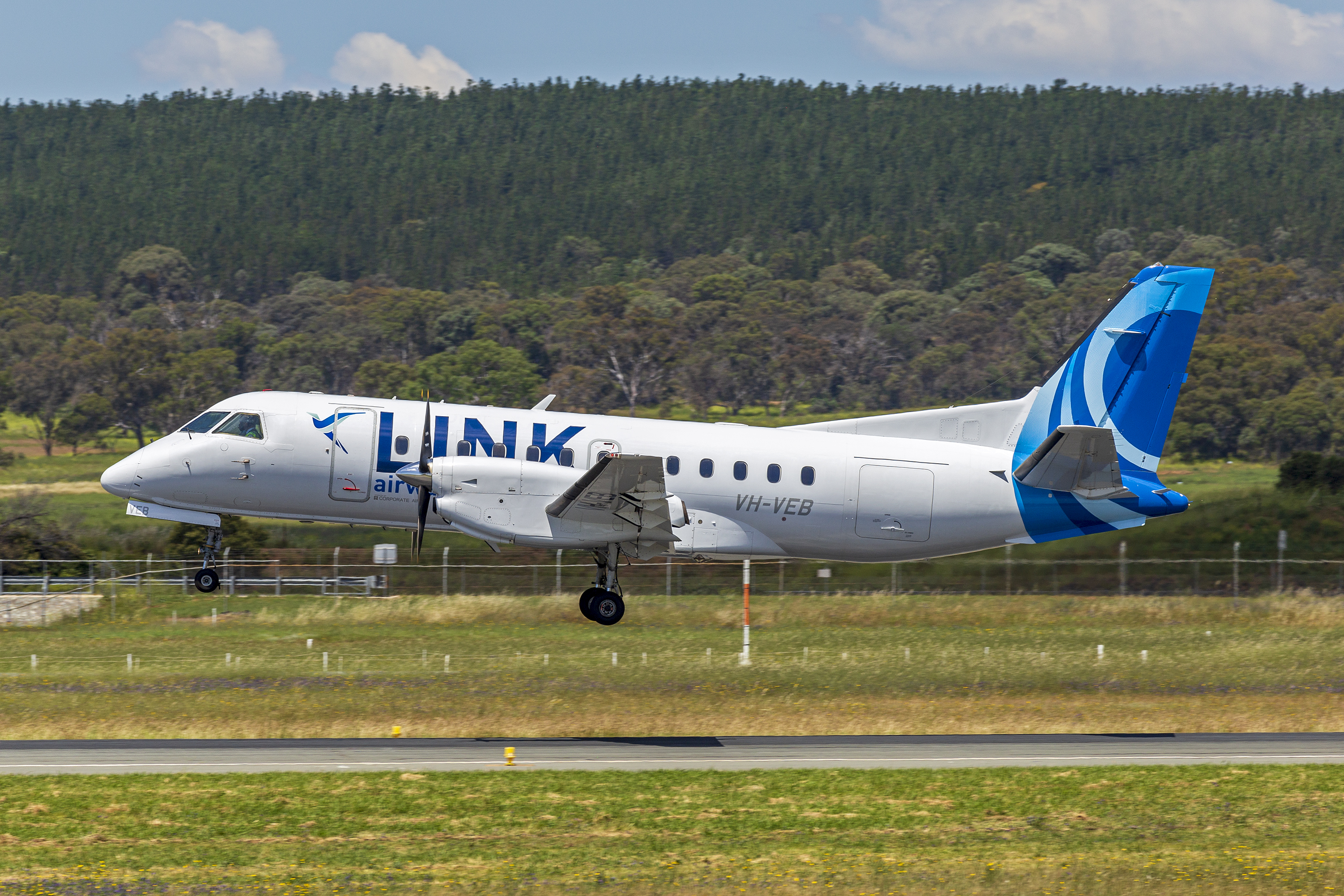
Link Airways Saab 340B, 2020

As of July 2022, the Link Airways fleet consists of the following aircraft:

Link Airways fleet
Aircraft	In-service	Orders	Passengers
Cessna 441 Conquest	4	—	N/A
Fairchild Metro 23	3	—	19
SAAB 340B Plus	11	—	34
Total	18	—	

== Destinations ==
Link Airways operates to the following destinations:

- Australian Capital Territory
  - Canberra
- New South Wales
  - Armidale
  - Coffs Harbour
  - Dubbo
  - Inverell
  - Narrabri
  - Newcastle
  - Orange
  - Sydney
  - Tamworth
- Queensland
  - Brisbane
  - Biloela
  - Bundaberg
- Tasmania
  - Hobart
  - Launceston
- Victoria
  - Melbourne (Tullamarine)

=== Codeshare agreements ===
As of January 2024, Link Airways has codeshare agreements with the following airlines:

- Virgin Australia

== Incidents and accidents ==
- On 21 November 2022, a Link Airways Saab 340B, registered VH-VEQ operating on behalf of Virgin Australia as flight VA-633 from Canberra to Sydney made an emergency landing shortly after takeoff. While accelerating on the runway, a ratchet strap used to secure the left-hand propeller while the aircraft is on the ground penetrated the side of the fuselage into the passenger cabin. The strap had not been removed before flight. The airline reported that the crew stopped the climb as soon as they became aware of the damage and aircraft landed safely seven minutes after departure, with no injuries to passengers. However, the Australian Federal Police reported that three passengers had been treated for minor injuries after landing. The Australian Transport Safety Bureau classified the occurrence as a serious incident and opened an investigation. The final report subsequently confirmed that one passenger had been injured by debris that penetrated the cabin. The ATSB investigation identified four safety issues related to flight preparation and ground handling procedures by both Link Airways and contracted ground services provider Swissport.
