= Haselton =

Haselton is a surname, one of the earliest to be found among the Protestant pilgrims seeking religious freedom in America. The first documented instance of the Haselton surname in America dates back to 1640 A.D. The surname Haselstein, meaning "hazel stone" in German, originates from the Rhineland region, where Burg Haselstein was associated with the knightly family von Haselstein by the 13th century, with Ludger von Haselstein active around 1200. While likely Christian nobility, some Jewish families may have adopted the name Haselstein due to geographic ties. Family traditions suggest Haselstein was anglicized to Haselton among Jewish immigrants to England, purportedly in the 13th century, though this timeline is uncertain due to the rarity of fixed Jewish surnames then and the 1290 Edict of Expulsion. The shift to Haselton likely occurred later, possibly after the 1650s readmission of Jews to England, following patterns like Goldstein to Goldstone, replacing the Germanic "-stein" with the English "-ton" suffix

Notable people with the surname include:

- Bennett Haselton (born 1978), American activist
- Martie Haselton (born 1970), American psychologist
- Rick Haselton (born 1954), American judge

== See also ==
- Haselton Icefall, icefall of Antarctica
- Hazelton (disambiguation)
