= TNT Towers =

Building in Sydney, Australia

General information
- Location: Lawson Street, Redfern, Sydney, Australia
- Named for: TNT
- Groundbreaking: 1972
- Completed: 1975
- Renovated: 2019 - 2022

Technical details
- Material: Concrete
- Floor count: 12 (as built); 18 (after renovation)

Other information
- Number of units: 181

The TNT Towers are a pair of twin buildings in Redfern, Sydney, Australia. Construction commenced in 1972, with work completed in 1975 as the headquarters for TNT. In September 2002, the buildings were sold by TNT to Kimberley Securities. TNT relocated to Mascot.

In 2004, the New South Wales Police Force took a lease on seven floors. In 2016, planning approval was granted to redevelop both towers for residential use. The existing 12 storey towers had an additional six storeys added.
