= Bathurst Airport (New South Wales) =

Airport in Bathurst, New South Wales

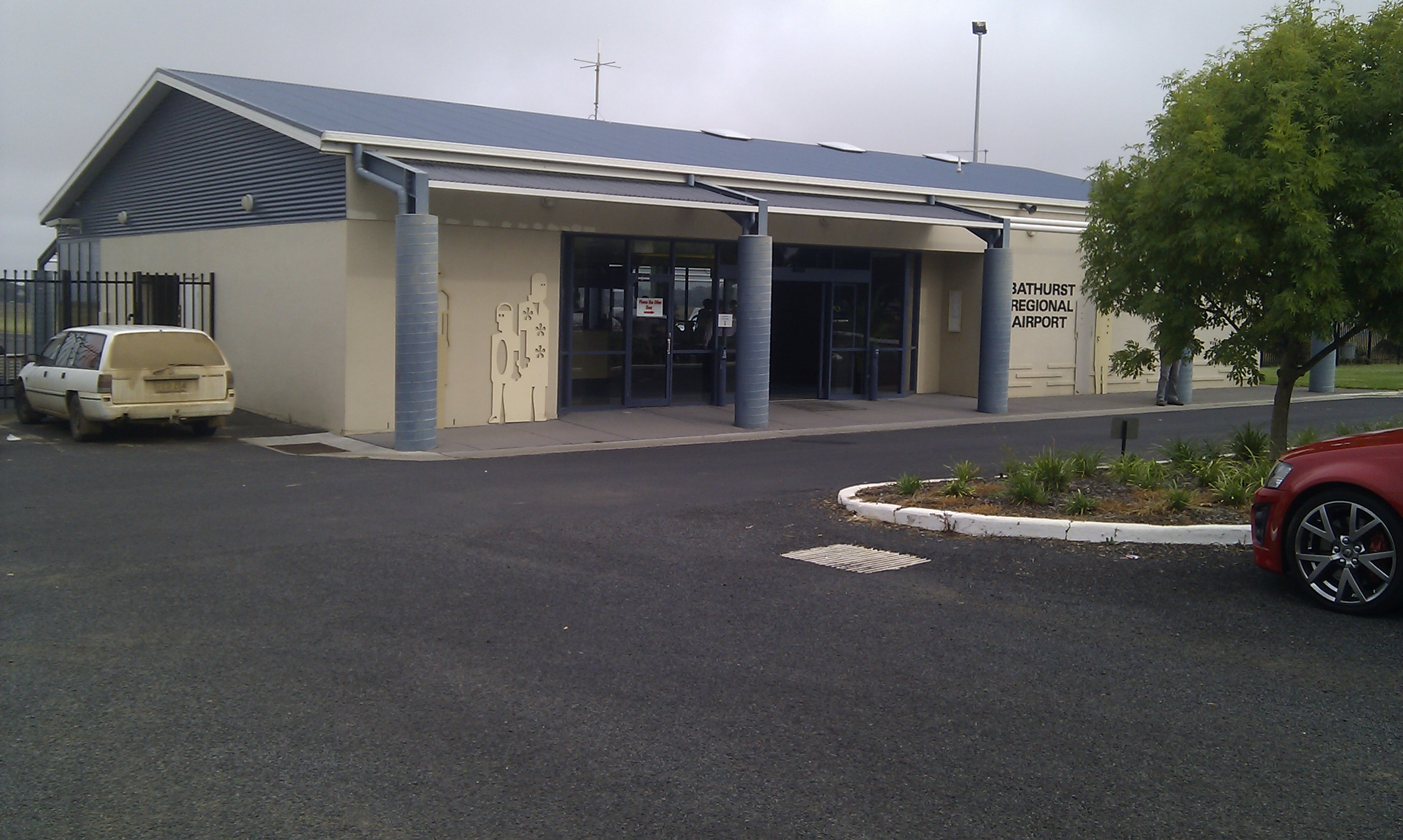
- Bathurst Airport terminal building, 2011
- IATA: BHS; ICAO: YBTH

Summary
- Airport type: Public
- Operator: Bathurst Regional Council
- Serves: Bathurst, New South Wales, Australia
- Elevation AMSL: 2,435 ft (742 m)
- Coordinates: 33°24′36″S 149°39′06″E
- Website: bathurst.nsw.gov.au

Map
- Location in New South Wales

Runways
Direction	Length		Surface
Direction	m	ft	Surface
17/35	1,705	5,594	Asphalt
08/26	1,318	4,324	Asphalt
17/35	1,140 (approx)	3,750 (approx)	Grass

Statistics (FY 2010–11)
- Passengers: 26,815
- Aircraft movements: 1,976
- Sources: AIP, BITRE

Bathurst Airport (IATA: BHS, ICAO: YBTH) is an airport serving Bathurst, New South Wales, Australia.

Located in the Central Tablelands, Bathurst Airport is not served by any airline. The airport's history dates to just prior the Second World War when local politicians campaigned for an airport for Bathurst. The war prompted the Federal Government to establish the aerodrome during the war years, immediately following the war commercial air services commenced with passenger flights to Sydney. Today several flying schools operate at the airport and it is used frequently by trainee pilots during their navigation training. It is a popular destination for many pilots, mostly trainee pilots from Bankstown and Camden Airports in the Sydney Basin.

The airport has two primary runways: one fully sealed and one partially sealed with a 150 meter section of grass at one end. The airport also has one secondary runway used for glider traffic. The main runway, taxiway and apron have lighting facilities which are pilot-activated.

There were 8,000 landings in 2010 which included recreational flying, business jets, charters, regular passenger flights, emergency services, and Air Force flights. The airport is owned, managed and maintained by the Bathurst Regional Council.

== Facilities ==
Navigational aids

- Automatic weather station
- Non Directional Beacon Radio Transmitter (NDB)
- Aerodrome Frequency Response Unit "Beep Back" (frequency identifying Bathurst Airport)
- Private aircraft hangars
- Air conditioned passenger terminal
- Unrestricted car park (security video surveillance)
- Refuelling services with Jet A-1 and Avgas
- Public transport – taxi stand

== History ==
On 2 December 1920 (predating the airport's opening) one of the earliest flights to land in Bathurst arrived with mail from Sydney. The aircraft, owned by the Bathurst Aviation Service Company, landed on a paddock at Kelso. 17 years later, in July 1937, General Air Transport commenced a weekly freight service transporting fresh fish from Nowra to Bathurst. This weekly flight landed in a paddock near to town and the lack of an aerodrome for Bathurst was noted in correspondence relating to this new air freight service.

The airport's history starts between 1937 and 1939 when the municipal council investigated several sites considered suitable for an aerodrome. What finally forced the federal government to act on a site was the Second World War; in 1942 a military airfield was opened at Raglan to take overflow traffic and aircraft parking from the overcrowded Richmond Air Base in Sydney's west.

A chronological list of events that document the development of the airport is below:

- 1945: First Groundsman appointed and Ben Chifley (MP) assisted council with representations that Bathurst Aerodrome should be used for civil air services.
- 1946: Officially opened as a civil airfield on 14 December 1946 by Prime Minister Ben Chifley. No facilities or services were yet provided.
- 1946: First regular commercial passenger flights commenced by Butler Air Transport Pty. Ltd. on 16 December.
- 1947: Butler Air Transport Pty. Ltd. used a DC-3 aircraft named Warrumbungle on the service to Bathurst, previously used in wartime service. Air fare £1 10s.
- 1948: Representations were made to the Minister for Air to secure land alongside the aerodrome for aero club training purposes, a shelter shed and other buildings.
- 1952: New buildings erected at the aerodrome and council agrees to the connect water supply.
- 1953: Radio navigational aids installed, and minor improvements to the shelter shed.
- 1954: Queen Elizabeth II arrives by plane at Bathurst Aerodrome.
- 1954–55: A local 'Air Safety Committee' was formed to act as observers and to arrange assistance for pilots in difficulty.
- 1956: Approach made to the Minister for Civil Aviation seeking lighting of Raglan Aerodrome, and lengthening of the runway to take Vickers Viscount passenger planes.
- 1956–57: Representations to the Postmaster-General's Department to have a public telephone installed at the aerodrome – application was rejected.
- 1957: The ATC Hut was officially opened and the Bathurst Aero Club dropped leaflets from aircraft over the city, advertising joy flights.
- 1959: In December the Government of Australia transferred the aerodrome to City of Bathurst. The runway at that time was an unsealed pavement, and the aerodrome was situated in the Turon Shire.
- 1963: Landing charges proposed.
- 1963: Airlines of New South Wales introduced Fokker F27 Friendship aeroplanes.
- 1964: New terminal building completed with Airlines of N.S.W. the first tenant, airport lighting now installed. Airlines of N.S.W. were operating a morning and an evening flight each way to Bathurst, then on to Parkes, using a Fokker Friendship aircraft.
- 1967: Submissions sent to the Department of Civil Aviation for a new taxiway to access the hangar area and an apron for light aircraft, and Airlines of N.S.W. stops its service to Bathurst and East West Airlines commences services.
- 1967: Aerodrome closes for 11 months to allow reconstruction of the runway.
- 1969: BP Australia hosts the BP Australia Air Race for home built aircraft and the entrance road is named the PJ Moodie Memorial Drive.
- 1972: Air ambulance services commenced operations.
- 1973: East West Airlines reports 16,348 total one-way passengers for 1973.
- 1974: Groundsman's Cottage constructed.
- 1977: A bus service was introduced by East West Airlines between the city and airport for passengers and freight.
- 1979: Runway resealed.
- 1981: The Southern Cross Air Race to Melbourne commenced from Bathurst Aerodrome.
- 1987: The basic structure for a control tower was erected at the aerodrome by Council and others for the 1987 October Car Races
- 1993: Runway resealed.
- 1994: The aircraft apron was extended.
- 2001: 12 September 2001, Hazelton Airlines parent company, Ansett, closes down and all Hazelton flights are temporarily suspended, recommencing several weeks later on a reduced service.
- 2002: Rex Group took over services to Bathurst from the Administrator operated Hazelton Airlines on 1 August 2002.
- 2010: Regional Express Airlines report carrying 24,000 passengers per year from Bathurst.
- 2011: New runway lighting and Precision approach path indicator installed on runway 17/35 including backup power supply – original runway lighting installed in 1960s.

The local PJ Moodie Bathurst Aero Club and the PJ Moodie Memorial Drive into the airport facilities are memorials to Alderman PJ Moodie who campaigned constantly for an airfield to be built at Bathurst.

== Airline and destination ==
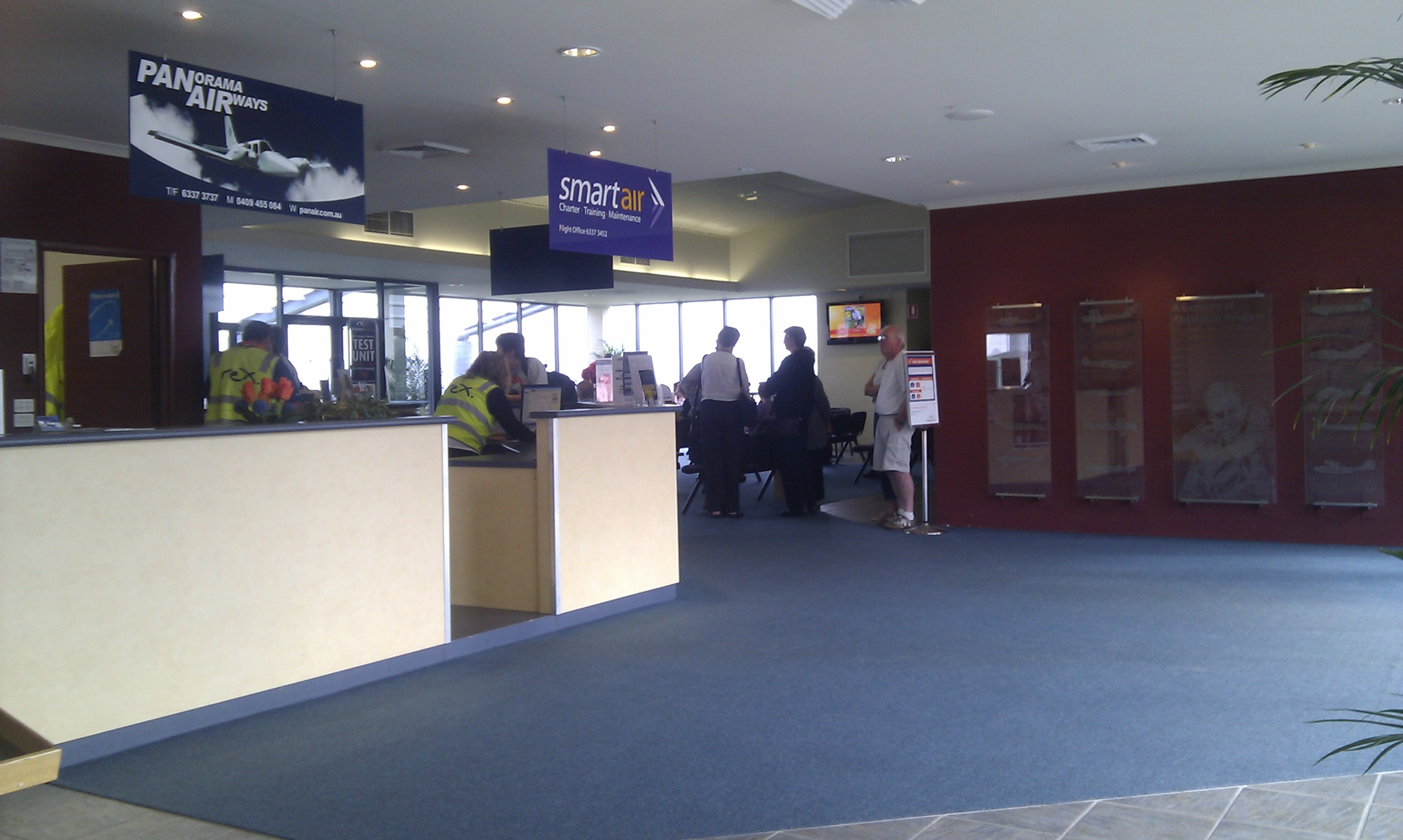
Bathurst Airport inside terminal building, 2011

=== Fly Pelican ===
FlyPelican flew return from Bathurst to Sydney Sunday to Friday starting on 5 September 2022. The services were operated on the BAE Jetstream 32 and later increased to running daily. FlyPelican concluded services to Bathurst on 14 July 2023 stating that the route was no longer financially viable.

=== Regional Express ===
Rex Airlines flew Bathurst to Sydney twice weekly (return) until 30 June 2022. At its peak, services previously operated up to three times daily. The airline also formerly operated flights three times weekly between Bathurst and Parkes. Regional Express is based in Wagga Wagga with its major NSW hub in Sydney. REX flew Saab 340, 34 seat turboprop aircraft on the Bathurst route.

Bathurst passenger traffic growth
Year	Passengers	Yearly growth %	Cumulative growth %
2002–03	13,916	7.98%	n/a
2003–04	15,478	10.09%	17.3%
2004–05	19,659	21.27%	34.9%
2005–06	21,137	6.99%	39.4%
2006–07	24,152	12.48%	47.0%
2007–08	24,941	3.16%	48.7%
2008–09	22,926	−8.79%	44.1%
2009–10	24,317	5.72%	47.3%
2010–11	26,815	9.32%	52.2%

=== Charter air services ===
Several companies provide charter services from the Bathurst Airport including Panorama Airways and Smartair.

=== Bathurst Aero Club ===
Bathurst Aero Club is a social club and training business founded in 1938 which has a club house beside the passenger terminal. The club has regular fly days and cross country excursions.

=== Flying Training ===
Several flying schools operate from the Bathurst Regional Airport, including Learn 2 Fly (18fifty3), Panair Panorama Airways and Ward Air.

=== Australian Air Force Cadets ===
No. 328 Squadron of Number 3 Wing Australian Air Force Cadets (AAFC) is based at the Bathurst Regional Airport. Parades and training sessions are held in rooms located in the Airport grounds. Squadrons from around NSW converge on Bathurst for gliding training during school holidays at four, two-week gliding courses each year operating primarily on the grass 17/35 strip and the grass on either side of the 08/26 runway.

== Accidents and incidents ==
- 7 November 2008 – a Piper PA-31-350 Chieftain crashed shortly after takeoff, the aircraft attempted a return to the airport but crashed 3 km (1.9 mi) short of the runway. The aircraft was flying from Moorabbin in Victoria to Port Macquarie with a refuelling stop at Bathurst. Four people were killed.
- 5 October 2006 – a BAC Strikemaster aircraft took off from Bathurst, for a 25-minute adventure flight with one passenger. The flight was to include high level aerobatics and a low level simulated attack routine. Two persons were killed when the aircraft broke up 20 km (12 mi) north east of Bathurst. Separation of the right wing was precipitated by pre-existing fatigue cracking in the right wing upper main spar attachment lug.
- 31 May 1974 – East West Airlines Flight 752/753, operated by a Fokker F-27, was scheduled to fly from Sydney to Orange, Bathurst and back to Sydney. The flight was uneventful until approach to Bathurst; the first officer made a late decision to change from landing on runway 17 to runway 35 due to a light shower in the approach path. On late final the aircraft drifted to the left of the runway centreline and with rain increasing and moderate turbulence the pilot ordered a go-around just prior to the runway threshold. The aircraft impacted the runway 1,240 m (4,070 ft) past the runway 35 threshold and slid on the ground for 625 m (2,051 ft) tearing the starboard engine from the wing. It was determined following investigation that during the climb, performance of the aircraft was adversely affected by an unpredictable encounter with a large change in the horizontal wind component, and an associated downdraft, at a height too low to effect recovery. There were no serious injuries, but the aircraft was written off.

== See also ==
- List of airports in New South Wales
