= Thomas Nationwide Transport =

Australian logistics company (1946–1998)

- Industry: Logistics
- Founded: 1946
- Founder: Kenneth William Thomas
- Defunct: June 1998
- Fate: merged with KPN's postal division to form TNT Post Group
- Successor: TNT Post Group
- Headquarters: TNT Towers, Sydney, Australia
- Key people: Peter Abeles
- Subsidiaries: Ansett Transport Industries (50%); Ansett Worldwide Aviation Services (50%); Condor Ferries (50%); Kwikasair; Port of Geelong; TNT Harbourlink; TNT Transit Systems; Union Shipping (50%)

Thomas Nationwide Transport (TNT) was an Australian logistics and transport company. Founded in 1946, it was taken over by KPN in 1996 and in 1998 became part of the TNT Post Group.

== History ==
TNT was founded by Kenneth William Thomas in 1946 with one International truck as KW Thomas Transport, being renamed Thomas Nationwide Transport in 1958. In January 1962 it was listed on the Sydney Stock Exchange.

In 1967 it merged with Alltrans to form TNT-Alltrans with Peter Abeles becoming managing director. In 1968 it purchased Kwikasair. In 1970 it commenced hiring complete freight trains to operate between Sydney and Melbourne.

It diversified into shipping, acquiring a 25% share in RW Miller in 1968, a 33% share in Bulkships in 1970, increasing it to 63% by 1976, a 50% share in Union Shipping in 1971, and a share in Anglo-French freight ferry firm; Truckline Ferries in 1973. In March 1972, TNT acquired a 23% shareholding in Ansett Transport Industries. It launched a takeover offer for Ansett, but withdrew it after the Government of Victoria advised it would legislate to prohibit it. In 1979, TNT increased its shareholding in Ansett to 50% with News Corporation holding the balance.

In the early 1970s it expanded into Asia, Brazil, Europe and North America. In February 1983 TNT purchased global document courier Skypak International from Ipec. TNT was awarded a 50-year concession in October 1985 to operate the Sydney Monorail, which opened as TNT Harbourlink in 1988.

from 1980 until 1996, Thomas Nationwide Transport was the official referee sponsor for the New South Wales Rugby League.

In December 1985, Thomas Nationwide Transport Limited was renamed TNT Limited to better reflect its common name. In 1987, Red Star Express Lines, Newark, New Jersey with 38 terminals in 12 states was acquired.

In 1991 TNT sold it 11% shareholding in Airborne Freight. In 1992 TNT acquired a 50% shareholding in Guernsey based Condor Ferries. In the same year it took a 50% stake in GD Express Worldwide, with the other 50% of shares held between partners KPN (Dutch telecoms and postal company) and the state owned postal companies of Canada, France, West Germany and Sweden.

In 1994 the Shipping and Development Division of TNT was spun-off and floated on the Australian Securities Exchange as Holyman.

In July 1996, TNT purchased a 30% shareholding in the Port of Geelong in partnership with Infrastructure Investment Corporation. In 1996 TNT sold its 50% shareholding in Ansett to Air New Zealand, although it retained its shareholding in Ansett Worldwide Aviation Services. It also sold its trucking businesses, including its 50% shareholding in Union Shipping to Brierley Investments, its Brazilian operations and Australian trucking interests. In August 1997, TNT commenced operating the Sydney Light Rail as TNT Transit Systems, under contract to Sydney Light Rail Company.

In January 1997, KPN took full ownership of TNT after launching a friendly takeover. In June 1998 TNT merged with KPN's PTT Post division to form the TNT Post Group.
