= Hazelton Airlines =

Regional airline of Australia

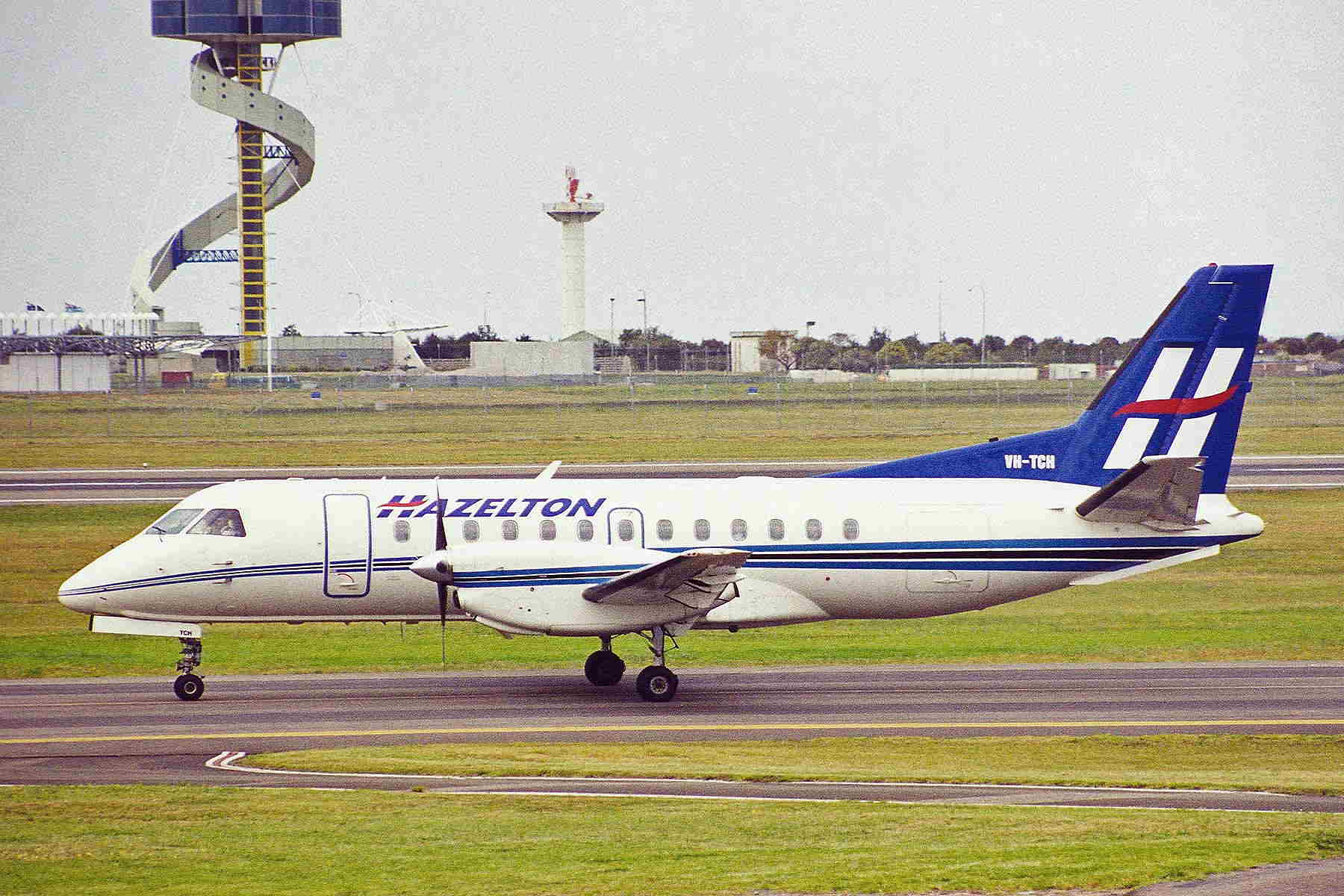
- Saab 340 at Sydney Airport
IATA	ICAO	Call sign
ZL	HZL	HAZELTON
- Founded: 1953
- Ceased operations: 31 July 2002
- Alliance: Star Alliance
- Destinations: See Below
- Parent company: Ansett Transport Industries
- Headquarters: Cudal, New South Wales, Australia
- Founders: Max Hazelton; Jim Hazelton

Hazelton Airlines was an Australian regional airline that was latterly a subsidiary of Ansett Transport Industries.

== History ==
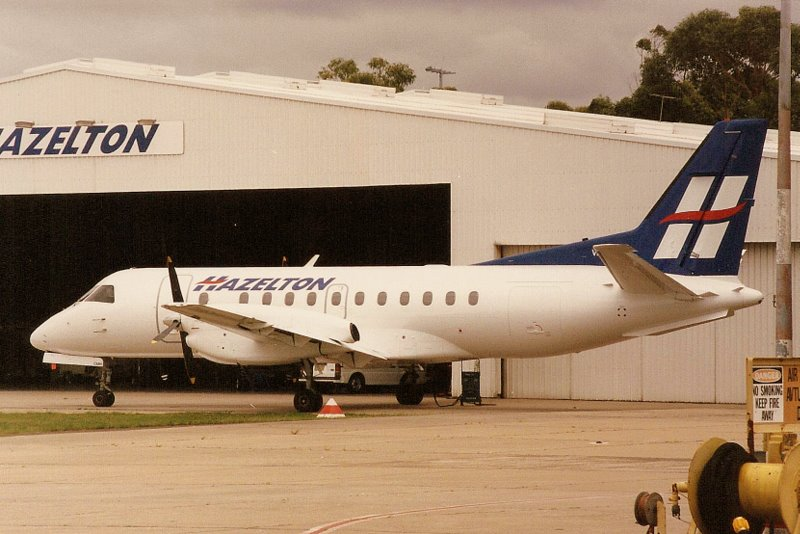
A Saab 340 in the colour scheme adopted by Hazelton after its takeover by Ansett Transport Industries

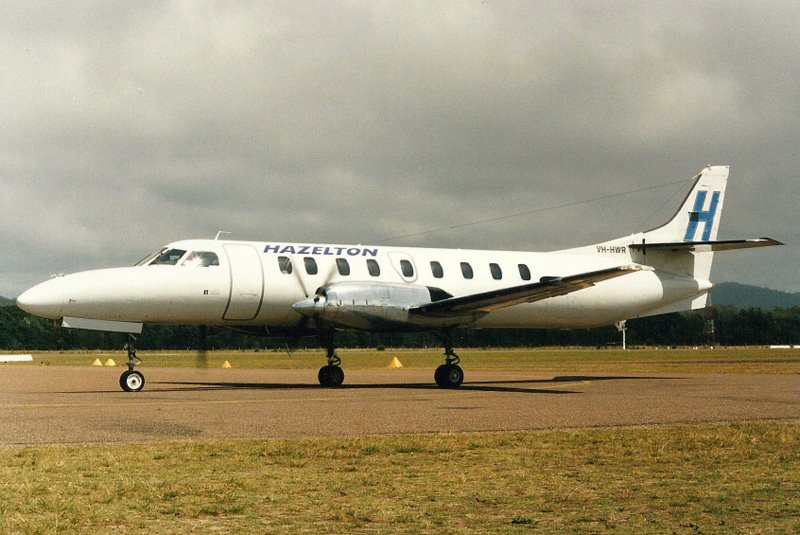
A Hazelton Fairchild Metro 23 in the airline's 1990s-era colour scheme

Hazelton Airlines was founded in 1953 by brothers Max and Jim Hazelton with a single Auster Aiglet aircraft offering charter services from a farm near Toogong, New South Wales, the fledgeling organisation was in 1959 relocated to Cudal. Scheduled passenger operations began in 1975 with flights between Orange and Canberra. By the 1980s Hazelton operated a sizeable fleet of piston-engined and turboprop aircraft including Cessna 310s, Piper PA-31-350 Chieftains and Embraer EMB 110 Bandeirantes, Shorts 360s as well as Cessna A188 Ag Husky crop sprayers.

In the 1990s Hazelton divested itself of its piston-engined passenger aircraft and associated routes in Western NSW to Air Link of Dubbo. At the time of its cessation, Hazelton operated an all turboprop fleet of Saab 340 and Fairchild Metro 23s. In 1993, Hazelton was listed on the Australian Securities Exchange. (ASX)

In October 2000 Ansett Transport Industries launched a successful takeover offer. Hazelton was delisted from the ASX on 4 April 2001.

Following the collapse of Ansett in September 2001, Hazelton was acquired by the Australiawide Airlines in July 2002 and merged with fellow Ansett subsidiary Kendell Airlines to form Regional Express on 1 August 2002.

== Destinations ==
Towards the end of its operation Hazelton Airlines operated to these destinations:

- Albury
- Armidale
- Bathurst
- Brisbane
- Broken Hill
- Casino
- Cudal
- Dubbo
- Gold Coast
- Griffith
- Lismore
- Merimbula
- Moruya
- Mudgee
- Narrandera
- Orange
- Parkes
- Sydney
- Traralgon
- Wagga Wagga

== Fleet ==
Throughout its existence, Hazelton Airlines operated these aircraft:

- Cessna 310
- Cessna A188
- Piper PA-31-350 Chieftain
- Embraer EMB 110 Bandeirante
- Fairchild Metro 23
- Saab 340
- Shorts 360
