= Edwin Hazelton =

English cricketer

Brigadier-General Edwin Hazelton FRCVS
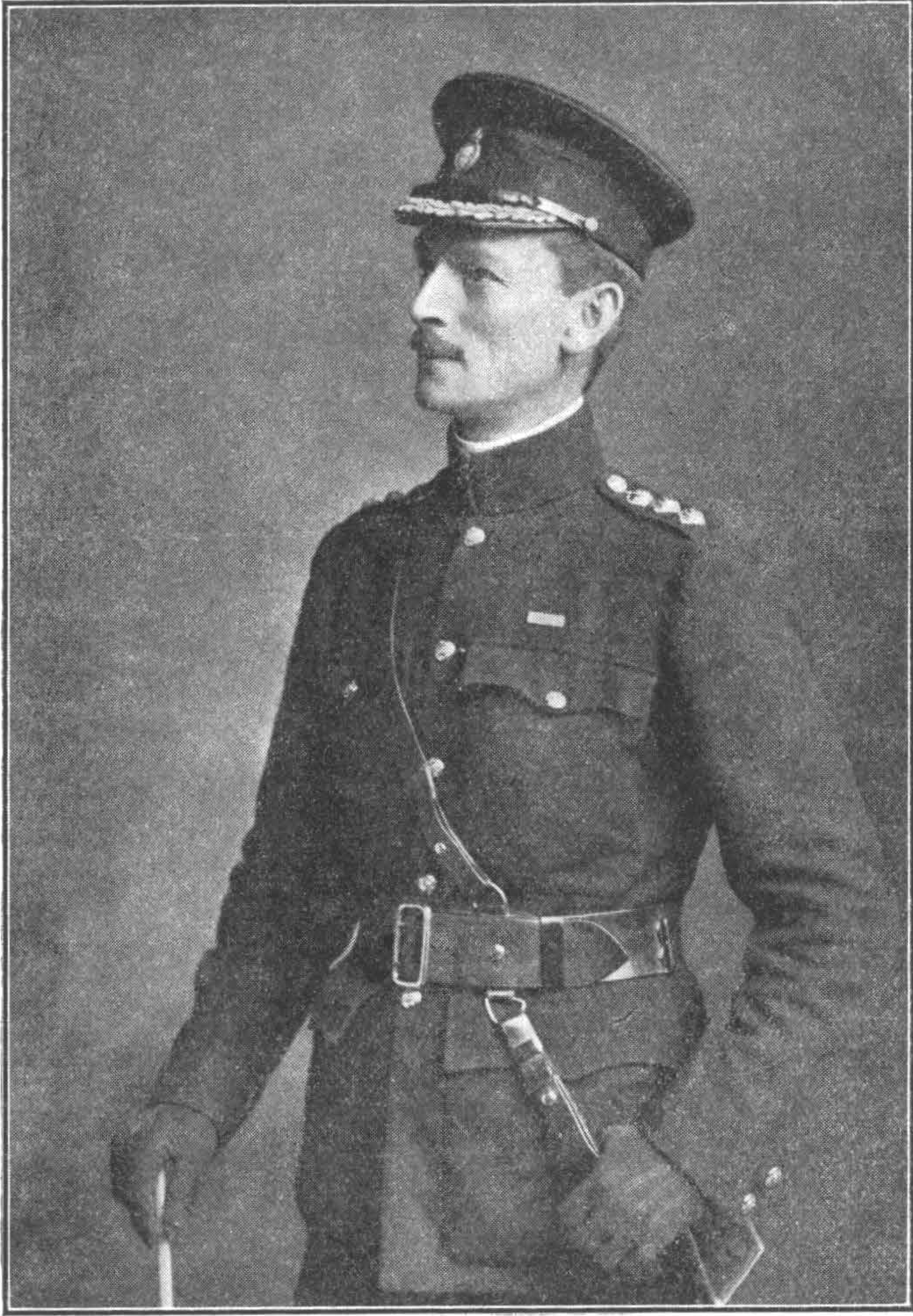
- Born: Edwin Hills Hazelton; 16 December 1861; Southampton, Hampshire, England
- Died: 25 July 1916 (aged 54); Simla, Punjab Province, British India
- Cricket career

Cricket information

Domestic team information
- Years: Team
- 1883: Hampshire

Career statistics
Competition	First-class
Matches	3
Runs scored	83
Batting average	16.60
100s/50s	0/1
Top score	50
Catches/stumpings	0/–
- Source: Cricinfo, 8 January 2010

Brigadier-General Edwin Hills Hazelton FRCVS (16 December 1861 – 25 July 1916) was a veterinary officer in the British Army and an English first-class cricketer.

Hazelton was born at Southampton in December 1861. He later trained to become a veterinarian at the Royal Veterinary College, graduating in 1883. After graduating, he was commissioned into the Army Veterinary Department (AVD) in September 1883 as a probationary veterinary surgeon. In the same year as his appointment to the British Army, Hazelton also played first-class cricket for Hampshire. He made three appearances, against Sussex, Surrey, and Somerset. In these, he scored 83 runs at an average of 16.60, with a highest score of 50 which came against Sussex.

In the AVD, Hazelton was promoted to veterinary captain in September 1893. He served in the Boxer Rebellion, taking part in the Relief of Peking in August 1900. He was also mentioned in dispatches during the rebellion. He was promoted to veterinary major in October 1902, with promotion to colonel following in October 1907. Hazelton served in the AVD during the First World War, during which was promoted to the temporary rank of brigadier-general in April 1916 and was made chief veterinary officer in British India. He served in Mesopotamian campaign during the war, from which he returned to India in April 1916. Around six weeks after his return, Hazelton strained his leg and was subsequently laid up in bed with thrombus of the saphena vein. He continued to fulfil his military duties while bedridden, prior to his death at Simla following a seizure on the night of 25 July 1916. Hazelton was given full military honours at his funeral, which was attended by Sir Beauchamp Duff (Commander-in-Chief, India) and the Viceroy of India. He was survived by his wife and their six children.
