= Coffs Harbour Airport =

Airport in Coffs Harbour, Australia

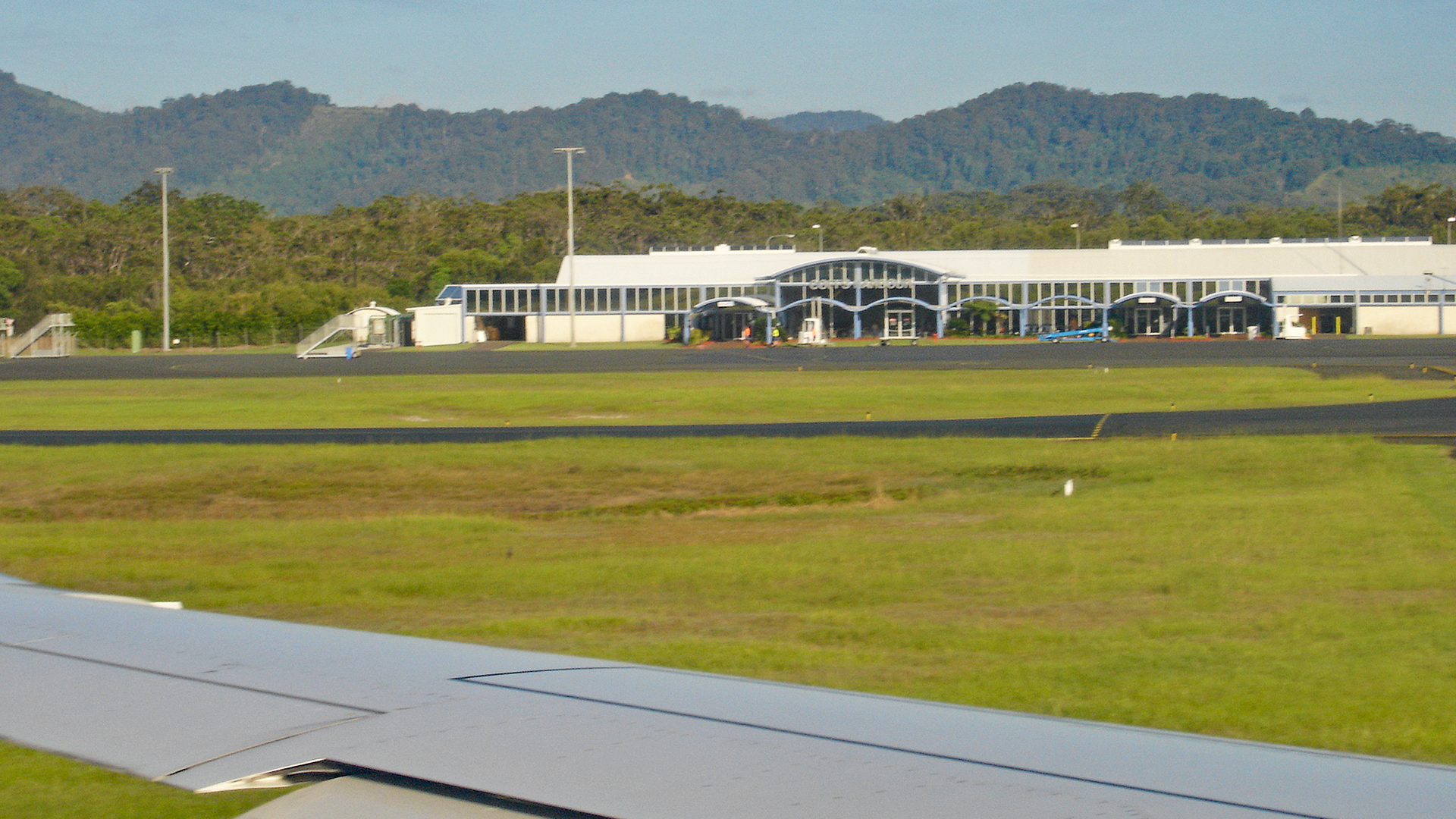
- View of the airport terminal from the runway
- IATA: CFS; ICAO: YCFS

Summary
- Airport type: Public
- Owner: Coffs Harbour City Council
- Operator: Palisade Investment Partners
- Location: Coffs Harbour
- Elevation AMSL: 18 ft (5.5 m)
- Coordinates: 30°19′12″S 153°07′00″E
- Website: www.coffsharbourairport.com

Map
- Location in New South Wales

Runways
Direction	Length		Surface
Direction	m	ft	Surface
03/21	2,080	6,824	Asphalt
10/28	849	2,785	Asphalt

Statistics (2021–22)
- Aircraft movements: 17,662
- Passengers: 178,514
- Sources: AIP, Aircraft movements from Airservices Australia

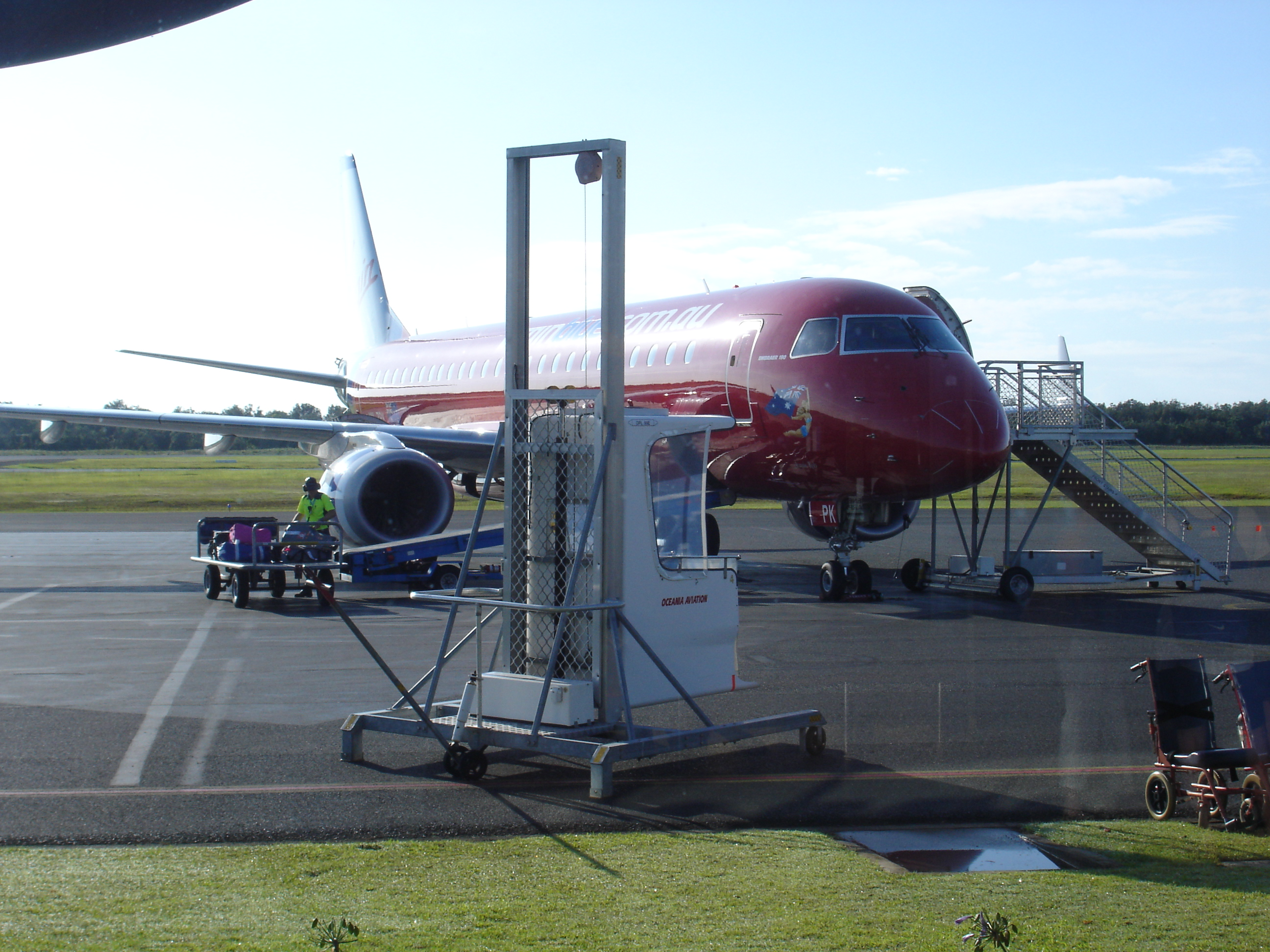
Virgin Blue Embraer E190 from Observation Deck

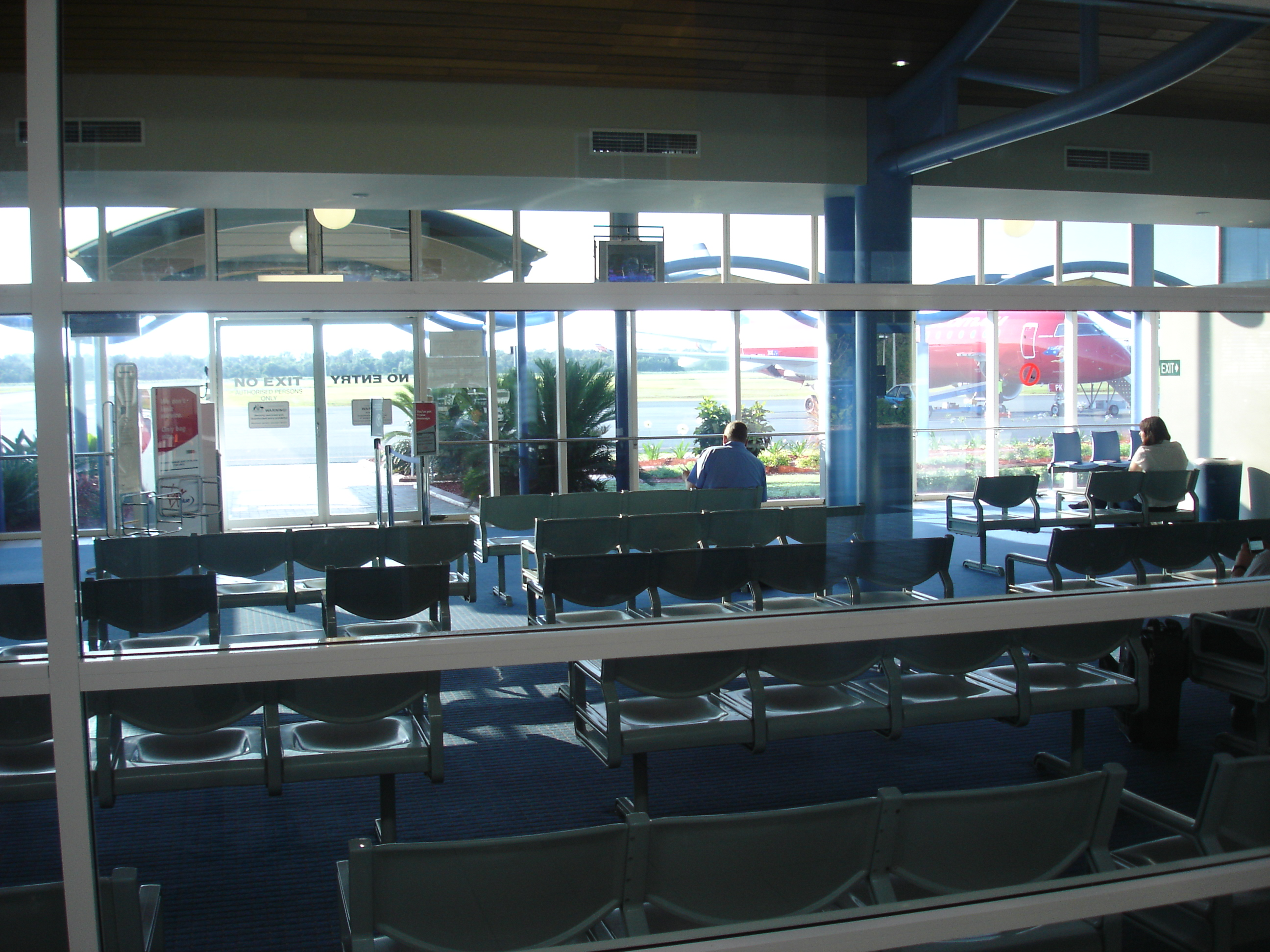
View of departures lounge, in the middle of the terminal, with a Virgin Blue E190 on the tarmac in the background

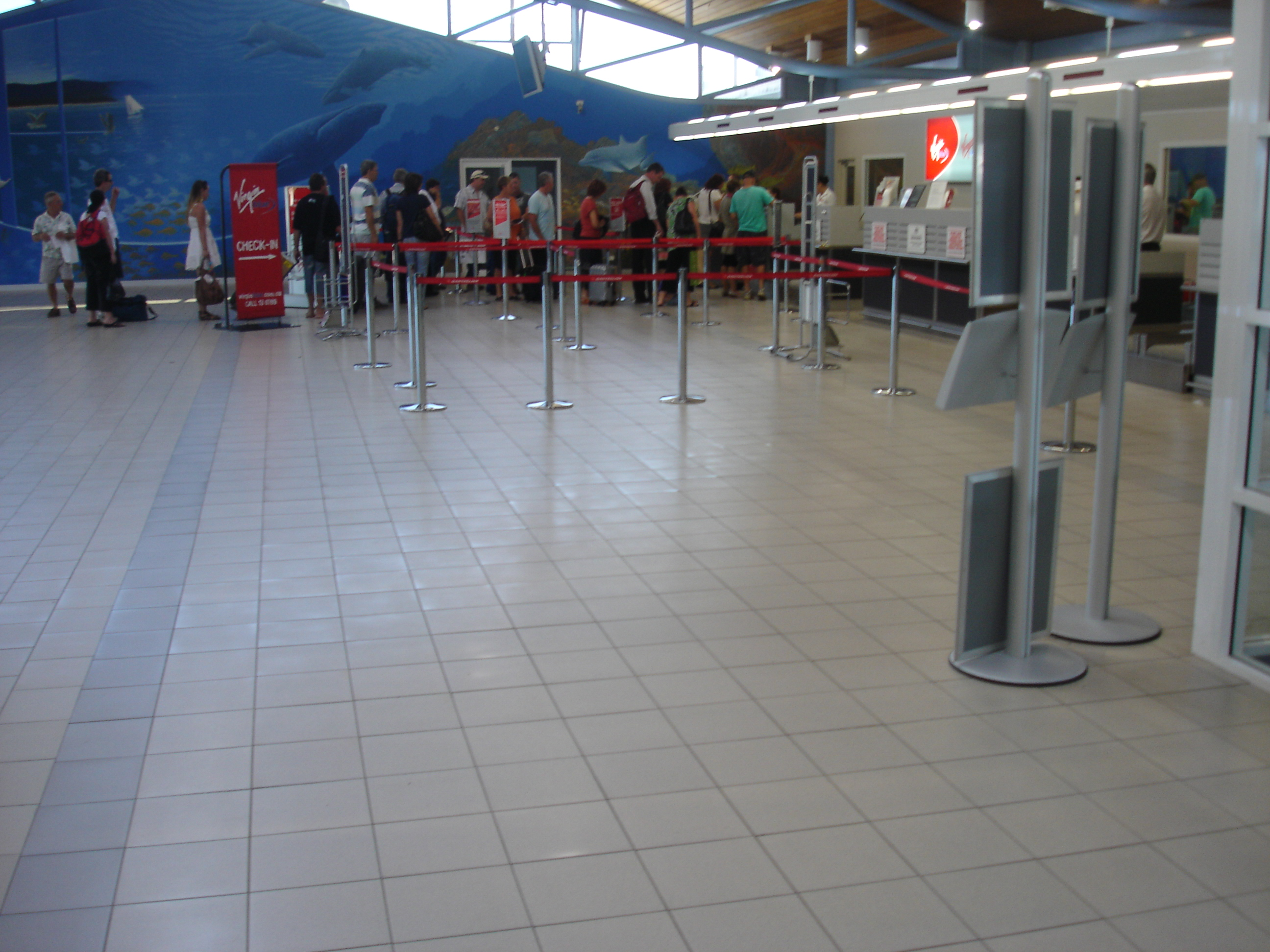
View of check-in area, at the northern end of the terminal

Coffs Harbour Airport (IATA: CFS, ICAO: YCFS) (formerly ICAO code of YSCH until November 2007) is the only airport serving the City of Coffs Harbour, in the New South Wales Mid North Coast region in Australia. The airport is located 3 km (1.9 mi) south of Coffs Harbour and is one of the busiest regional airports in the state, serving flights to the east coast capital cities, as well as some regional destinations. Coffs Harbour Airport has the capacity to handle large aircraft such as the Boeing 767 or Boeing 777 but is predominantly served by regional airlines using smaller aircraft.

In 2021–22 the airport handled 17,662 total aircraft movements. The terminal handled a record 413,103 passengers in the 2017–18 financial year, making it the 22nd busiest airport in Australia. However, the impacts of travel restrictions in response to the COVID-19 pandemic resulted in a significant reduction in revenue passengers, with the airport handling 178,514 during 2021–22, falling to the 28th busiest airport.

== History ==
The airport was established by the council in 1928. It was requisitioned by the Royal Australian Air Force during World War II for the purposes of an airbase for anti-submarine patrols. No. 71 Squadron and 'C' Flight No. 73 Squadron operated from the base from 1943 until being disbanded in late 1944. No. 12 Operational Base Unit maintained and serviced the airfield during its operation. A number of bunkers associated with the RAAF's occupation exist near the airfield, including one which has been repurposed as a gallery containing a large collection of cartoon art.

With the introduction of Fokker F28 regional jets by Airlines of New South Wales in 1983, Coffs Harbour was identified by the federal government as one of six regional centres in the state to receive airport upgrades to support their operation. These works were estimated to cost $9.6 million, involving the construction of a new runway, taxiways, apron and terminal building, and an air traffic control tower, all expected to be completed by September 1985. Projections at this time were that the airport would handle in excess of 26,000 aircraft movements and 112,000 passengers by the year 2000.

In 1993 Air New Zealand operated a promotional flight from Auckland using a Boeing 737, with the support of the Coffs Harbour Council. Despite hopes that such charters would help to drive tourism in the region, the flight was reported to have run at a loss of close to $60,000.

In August 1999 the runway was widened from 30 to 45 metres to accommodate Boeing 767s.

From the early 2000s, the airport became a regular destination for training flights by cadets from the Singapore Flying College, owing to its favourable weather, surrounding high terrain and air traffic control facilities.

In 2015, Coffs Harbour Airport secured funding from the Government of New South Wales to expand the apron space to allow more parking for narrowbody jet aircraft, as well as upgrades to the security screening and baggage facilities. These works increased the number of parking bays at the terminal from three to five, which can be occupied simultaneously.

In late 2020, the City of Coffs Harbour entered into a 50-year agreement, leasing the airport to Palisade Investment Partners to operate and develop the airport. This agreement included the development of the 23 ha (57 acres) Airport Enterprise Park, adjacent to the general aviation facilities north of the main terminal. This construction resulted in the permanent closure of taxiway E5, which was equipped with edge lighting to facilitate the movement of aircraft to the general aviation area at night. During construction, the smaller runway 10/28 was also closed, fueling speculation that it too would be permanently closed and converted to a taxiway. While this was denied by the airport's management, it was conceded that the future of the runway was under review, with safety given priority over development.

== Facilities ==
Coffs Harbour Airport is one of the few regional airports in New South Wales to have an Air Traffic Control tower, as well as Aircraft rescue and firefighting capabilities, however both of these services generally operate during daylight hours only. When the tower is closed, pilots are required to communicate via a Common Traffic Advisory Frequency to safely co-ordinate arrivals and departures. Airline operations are limited to the main runway, 03/21, which measures 2,080 m × 45 m (6,824 ft × 148 ft) and can be used for instrument approach procedures. The secondary runway, 10/28, does not provide any lighting or approach guidance and is only suitable for aircraft under a maximum takeoff weight of 5,700 kg (12,600 lb).

Inside the terminal is a small Qantas Regional Lounge, accessible to Qantas Club and frequent flyer program members, There are two cafes in the public departures lounge, and free Wi-Fi is available throughout the terminal. The airport offers both open air and undercover secure paid parking. Immediately north of the main terminal is a smaller charter terminal that does not provide security screening.

The general aviation area, located north of runway 10/28 supports airport related businesses including aircraft maintenance providers, a bulk fuel storage facility, flight training, and fixed-base operators. There are also a number of community organisations and emergency services located in this precinct, including local units of the Australian Air Force Cadets and Australian Air League, the Coffs Harbour Aero Club, a New South Wales Rural Fire Service control centre and facilities for aero medical operators.

== Airlines and destinations ==
Airlines	Destinations
Link Airways	Brisbane; Seasonal: Canberra
QantasLink	Melbourne, Sydney
Rex Airlines	Sydney

== Statistics ==
Annual passenger statistics for Coffs Harbour Airport
Year	Total passengers	Aircraft movements
2010–11	341,116	6,928
2011–12	336,369	5,983
2012–13	357,624	5,863
2013–14	383,051	5,925
2014–15	354,212	5,572
2015–16	375,530	5,708
2016–17	405,624	6,151
2017–18	413,103	5,865
2018–19	396,392	5,720
2019–20	289,116	4,560
2020–21	130,262	3,826
2021–22	178,514	4,835

== Operations ==
Busiest domestic routes out of Coffs Harbour Airport (Year ending December 2021)
Rank	Airport	Passengers	% change	Carriers
1	Sydney	113,002	▲4.5	QantasLink, Rex
2	Melbourne	no data yet	no data yet	QantasLink
3	Brisbane	no data yet	no data yet	Link Airways

== Ground transport ==
CDC NSW route 364 provides a regular local bus service linking the airport with the Coffs town centre as well as the southern suburbs of Toormina and Sawtell. Local taxis are also available from the airport, while the a number of regional coach services connect the airport to the surrounding region via the Pacific Highway.

== Incidents and accidents ==
- On 15 May 2003, an Ambulance Service of New South Wales Beechcraft B200C King Air aircraft had to make an emergency landing at Coffs Harbour Airport, after it hit the sea or a reef near the Coffs Harbour boat harbour, during an instrument approach in heavy rain and poor visibility. One of the main landing gear legs was torn off; there were no injuries. The aircraft was subsequently scrapped.
