= Jim Hazelton =

Australian aviator (1931–2014)

- Born: James David Hazelton; 21 June 1931; Cudal, New South Wales, Australia
- Died: 10 June 2014 (aged 82); Aeroglen, New South Wales, Australia
- Known for: Co-founder of Hazelton Airlines

James David Hazelton (21 June 1931 – 10 June 2014) was an Australian aviator and co-founder, alongside his brother Max, of Hazelton Airlines, a regional Australian airline which later became Regional Express Airlines.

In 1964 he became the first Australian to fly a single-engine aircraft solo across the Pacific, piloting a Piper Comanche 400, a crossing he would repeat over 200 times.

== Biography ==
James David Hazelton was born on 21 June 1931 as the youngest of seven children of Charles James and Enid Hazelton, née Bowman. Apart from these six siblings, five brothers and a sister he had another older half sister from a previous marriage of his father.

His aviation career started at Orange Aero Club, becoming a private pilot in 1950. He acquired his commercial licence in 1951 and joined the Newcastle Aero Club.

After co-founding Hazelton Airlines with his brother Max, starting out at the family farm at Toogong, he left the airline to establish his own flight training school, Navair, at Bankstown Airport. He went on to ferry aircraft for Formula 1 driver Graham Hill as well as instructing Jim Clark and Jackie Stewart in flying. He also accompanied Australian entrepreneur Dick Smith on the latter's international journeys. He was part of the search team for his brother Max when the latter crashed in the Blue Mountains in 1954 and went missing for a number of days.

In 1964 Hazelton flew a single-engine aircraft solo across the Pacific, piloting a Piper Comanche 400. He was refused permission from the Australian Civil Aviation authority to do so and had to take out a US licence instead to carry out the flight. He would go on to repeat the Pacific crossing over 200 times in his lifetime.

In 2008, while ferrying a Second World War Catalina flying boat from Portugal to Australia, Hazelton and his crew got caught up in the Mumbai terrorist attack and had to escape under gun fire, having to take off from the city's airport without the proper paperwork. In 2011 Hazelton, with a friend, re-enacted the 1928 trans-Pacific crossing of Charles Kingsford Smith in a single engine Beechcraft Bonanza 36, flying from Oakland, California, to Brisbane, Queensland.

Jim Hazelton died of prostate cancer on 10 July 2014 at his home at Aeroglen, New South Wales, having carried out his last ferry flight of an aircraft to New Zealand only a few months before. He was described as a modest person and as one of the greatest and most gifted Australian pilots by a family friend. He was survived by his wife and ex-wife as well as seven of his eight children, a number of whom are also active in the aviation industry.

== See also ==
- Lady Southern Cross for the first single-engine trans-pacific flight.
