= Alltrans =

- Industry: Logistics
- Founded: 1950
- Founder: Peter Abeles; George Rockey
- Defunct: 1967
- Fate: Merged with Thomas Nationwide Transport
- Headquarters: Sydney, Australia

Alltrans was an Australian logistics company. Established in 1950 by Peter Abeles and George Rockey with two second-hand trucks, its first contract was in Broken Hill. In 1966 a 35% share in the business was purchased by William Baird & Co of Scotland.

In 1967 it merged with Thomas Nationwide Transport to form TNT-Alltrans. By this stage it operated 500 trucks and had a presence in New Zealand.

The Alltrans name continued to be used when in 1969 Walkup's Merchants Express in the United States was purchased by TNT-Alltrans and renamed Alltrans Express. In 1983 TNT named a ship TNT Alltrans.
