= Peter Abeles =

Australian businessman

Sir Peter Emil Herbert Abeles, AC (25 April 1924 – 25 June 1999) was an Australian transportation magnate. A refugee from Hungary, he became a businessman in Australia, and was knighted in 1972.

== Career ==
Abeles was born in Vienna, Austria to a well-to-do Hungarian-Jewish family (his last name was originally spelled as Ábel). Abel grew up in Budapest and after Germany occupied Hungary in 1944, Abeles, who was Jewish, was sent to a Nazi work camp. After the war, he later became a cabaret entrepreneur, working in Romania, where in 1947 he met and married his first wife, Claire Dan, a cabaret performer. In 1949 they migrated to Australia. After doing small business by selling books and clothing, he quickly befriended George Rockey, a fellow Hungarian immigrant.

The pair bought two trucks, which they named "Samson" and "Delilah," and set up a transport company, Alltrans. In 1967, Alltrans merged with Thomas Nationwide Transport, the combined companies trading as TNT-Alltrans. Under Abeles' guidance as managing director, TNT quickly expanded, and by the 1980s had established a presence in 180 countries and was termed "the second biggest transport empire in the world, operating by road, rail, sea and air".

He and Claire Dan adopted two daughters in the 1950s, and divorced around 1970.

In 1979, Abeles entered into an agreement with media mogul Rupert Murdoch to take over Ansett Transport Industries. In 1989, he was involved as managing director of Ansett Australia in the 1989 Australian pilots' dispute. He was chief executive and joint managing director from 1982 until 1992. In September 1992 he left TNT to concentrate his efforts on the ailing Ansett, but just two months later he stepped down from the airline as well.

In addition to his work for TNT and Ansett, Abeles was from August 1984 to August 1994 on the board of the Reserve Bank of Australia, and was chairman of the Australian Cancer Research Foundation.

Abeles was close friends with Bob Hawke and acted as his de facto adviser on economic matters. The historian C. J. Coventry has shown that in 1974 Abeles, along with Rupert Murdoch, supported Hawke's idea of forming a new centrist political party to seize power from the Whitlam government, but that this did not eventuate because of the events of 1975.

During Hawke's time as Prime Minister, Abeles was Hawke's witness to the Kirribilli Agreement of 1988 in which he agreed to hand over the Prime Ministership to Paul Keating if and after Hawke had won the 1990 election.

== Honours ==
Abeles was knighted in 1972 for services to business and the arts, on the recommendation of the New South Wales government led by Sir Robert Askin. He was appointed a Companion of the Order of Australia in 1991, and was named "Australian of the Year" by The Australian in 1987.

== Death ==
Abeles died in Sydney on 25 June 1999 at the age of 75, of cancer. He was survived by his second wife, Kitty; his two adopted daughters with his first wife Claire Dan; and a stepdaughter. He is buried in Section 23E of Rookwood Cemetery, in Sydney.

== Controversy and criminal connections ==
Sir Peter occasionally cut a controversial figure with alleged business tactics, and was seen as unsympathetic towards minority shareholders. He was also caught up in the allegations of corruption that centred on then NSW Premier Sir Robert Askin, from whom journalist David Hickie accused him of buying his 1972 knighthood, giving Askin a seat at the board of TNT and 110,000 shares. He has been accused of being an associate of crime boss Abe Saffron and of being involved in drug trafficking with the Nugan Hand Bank. Abeles admitted to having common business interests with US West Coast Mafia boss Jimmy "The Weasel" Fratianno, but claimed that he did not know that Fratianno was a Mafioso. He did, however, admit to having given another mafioso, Venero Frank "Benny Eggs" Mangano (later the underboss for the Genovese crime family), a 'consultancy fee' of $US300,000 for 'advice' on how to acquire a US east coast shipping line, Seatrain, and other matters related to the New York waterfront."

Abeles was also connected to Rudy Michael Tham, leader of Local 856, "the second largest Teamsters' branch in San Francisco and mafia 'associate'." In the 1970s, TNT's US operations were besieged by a number of "strikes, shootings and bombings." These stopped when Tham intervened. It was Tham who introduced Abeles to Fratianno, and Mangano, associate of Frank Tieri, who was then the boss of New York's Genovese family.

Abeles' denial of any knowledge of mafia involvement in his business is supported in an interview conducted by the Australian Federal Police with Fratianno in San Francisco in 1979 when he told them that "I don't think that he knew these guys had connections." The payments, Fratianno said, were all legal, paid to corporations to ensure there would be no Union trouble on the docks; nothing was given "under the table."
