= Max Hazelton =

Australian aviator (1927–2023)

Max Hazelton AM OBE
- Born: Charles Maxwell Hazelton; 6 May 1927
- Died: 9 April 2023 (aged 95)
- Known for: Founder of Hazelton Airlines
- Spouse: Laurel Hazelton
- Children: 2

Charles Maxwell Hazelton AM OBE (6 May 1927 – 9 April 2023) was an Australian aviator and founder of Hazelton Airlines, alongside his brother Jim, a regional Australian airline which became Regional Express Airlines after a merger in August 2002.

== Biography ==
Born in May 1927, Charles Maxwell Hazelton, from a young age, aimed at becoming a pilot. He joined the Air Training Corps at the age of 16 but, when the Second World War ended in 1945, he saw his pilot career under threat since the Royal Australian Air Force already had too many pilots, seemingly leaving him without a future in the industry.

Working as an apprentice automotive engineer in Sydney, he continued his interest in becoming a pilot, eventually acquiring a private and, later, a commercial pilot's license. With support from his mother he purchased his first aircraft, an Auster Aiglet Trainer for 2,500 Pounds. He started his own charter company in 1953 from his brother-in-law’s property at Toogong, New South Wales.

In October 1954, he crashed his plane on a flight from Bankstown Airport in heavy rain near Oberon, but escaped uninjured. While only 16 kilometres from Oberon he got lost in heavy fog, hiking for six days and covering over 100 kilometres before returning to civilisation.

Purchasing a new aircraft, a Cessna 180, he continued flying charters and applying fertiliser and pesticides. He was reported for night flying by the local police, then illegal, but was able to convince the authorities to lift the ban, pointing out that flying conditions were calmer at night and crop spraying was essential to local cotton farmers. In 1959 he moved operations to Cudal, where he operated his own airfield.

Not afraid of controversy, he piloted the South African rugby union team during their tour in Australia and broke a union ban on Merino ram exports to Fiji in 1971 by flying them there.

By 1968, his airline, Hazelton Airlines, operated 22 aircraft. By 1994, when he floated his company on the stock market, Hazelton Airlines carried 330,000 passengers a year. In November 1995, he stepped down as CEO of the airline after a boardroom fight for control of the company. In 2001, the Hazelton family sold their stake in the airline to Ansett Australia, after a take-over battle between the former and Qantas. After Ansett collapsed in September 2001, Hazelton Airlines continued operations and, together with Kendell Airlines, became Regional Express Airlines on 1 August 2002.

Hazelton continued to be involved in the aviation industry, writing comments in the Central Western Daily on airline industry matters.

He was appointed Officer of the Order of the British Empire (OBE) in the 1981 New Year Honours for service to aviation, and appointed Member of the Order of Australia (AM) in the 1991 Queen's Birthday Honours, again for service to aviation.

Hazelton died on 9 April 2023, at the age of 95. His widow, Laurel Ivy Hazelton, died on 23 June 2024, aged 88. The two were survived by one of their two children.
