= Armidale Airport =

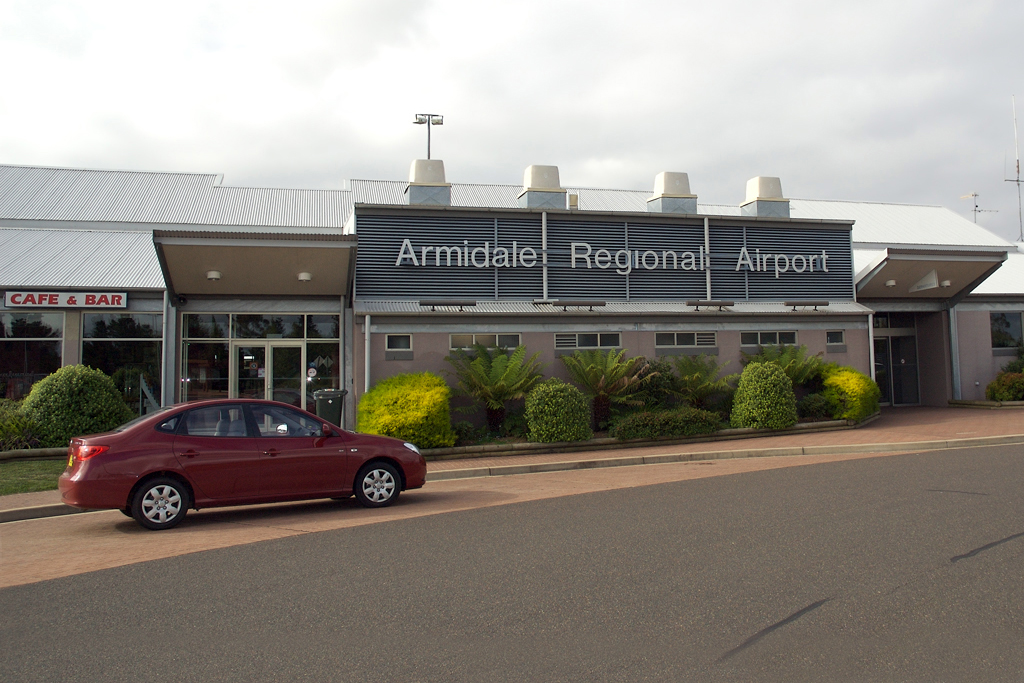
- IATA: ARM; ICAO: YARM

Summary
- Airport type: Public
- Operator: Armidale Regional Council
- Serves: Armidale, New South Wales, Australia
- Elevation AMSL: 3,556 ft (1,084 m)
- Coordinates: 30°31′42″S 151°37′00″E
- Website: armidaleairport.com

Map
- Location in New South Wales

Runways
Direction	Length		Surface
Direction	m	ft	Surface
05/23	1,738	5,702	Asphalt
09/27	1,116	3,661	Grass/gravel

Statistics (FY 2012–13)
- Revenue passengers: 107,470
- Aircraft movements: 3,141
- Sources: Airservices Australia, Bureau of Infrastructure & Transport Research Economics

Armidale Regional Airport (IATA: ARM, ICAO: YARM) is an airport in Armidale, New South Wales. It is located 2 nautical miles (3.7 km; 2.3 mi) southwest of the town centre, on the New England Highway. The airport is operated by the Armidale Regional Council.

== Facilities ==
The airport resides at an elevation of 3,556 ft (1,084 m) above mean sea level. It has two runways: 05/23 with an asphalt surface measuring 1,738 m × 30 m (5,702 ft × 98 ft) and 09/27 with a grassed gravel surface measuring 1,116 m × 30 m (3,661 ft × 98 ft).

== Airlines and destinations ==
Airlines	Destinations
Link Airways	Brisbane,
QantasLink	Sydney

=== Previous airlines ===
A Tamworth–Armidale–Brisbane route was served by QantasLink until 2002, when the service was taken over by MacAir Airlines until January 2003, after which time it was operated by Sunshine Express Airlines before the company ceased scheduled flying in 2006. Brindabella Airlines commenced Armidale-Brisbane flights in August 2011 using Metro III turboprop aircraft; however, this service was discontinued in June 2012. The decision to withdraw from Armidale and Albury made national headlines as it was widely reported the airline's reasons included an expected increase in operating costs due to the implementation of the controversial Carbon pricing scheme by the Gillard government set to become effective the following month.

Rex Airlines flew from Sydney to Armidale between 2014 and 2023, when services were terminated, giving Qantas a monopoly on the route again.

== Airport upgrade ==
A new terminal building opened in February 1997.

The Armidale Regional Council has a number of upgrades to the airport currently in progress, with much of the funding for the works promised by Member for New England Barnaby Joyce during the 2013 Australian federal election campaign. Previously the council had unsuccessfully submitted a proposal to the Regional Development Australia Fund in 2012 for $2.45 million in funding to allow upgrades to the airport terminal, security screening and apron areas, as well as resurfacing the runway, construction of a parallel taxiway and upgrading the airport's lighting. When complete the works will increase capacity, allowing the airport to handle 70 seat aircraft such as the Bombardier Q400 operated by QantasLink and potentially attract new airlines such as Virgin Australia, operating ATR 72 type aircraft through its regional subsidiaries.

== Statistics ==
Armidale Airport was ranked 45th in Australia for the number of revenue passengers served in financial year 2012–2013.

Annual passenger and aircraft statistics for Armidale
Year	Revenue passengers	Aircraft movements
2003–04	63,678	3,766
2004–05	89,616	5,466
2005–06	100,984	5,511
2006–07	86,215	2,946
2007–08	95,273	3,122
2008–09	95,559	2,597
2009–10	99,578	2,702
2010–11	104,888	3,074
2011–12	106,944	3,528
2012–13	107,470	3,141

== See also ==
- List of the busiest airports in Australia
- List of airports in New South Wales
