= Bourke Airport =

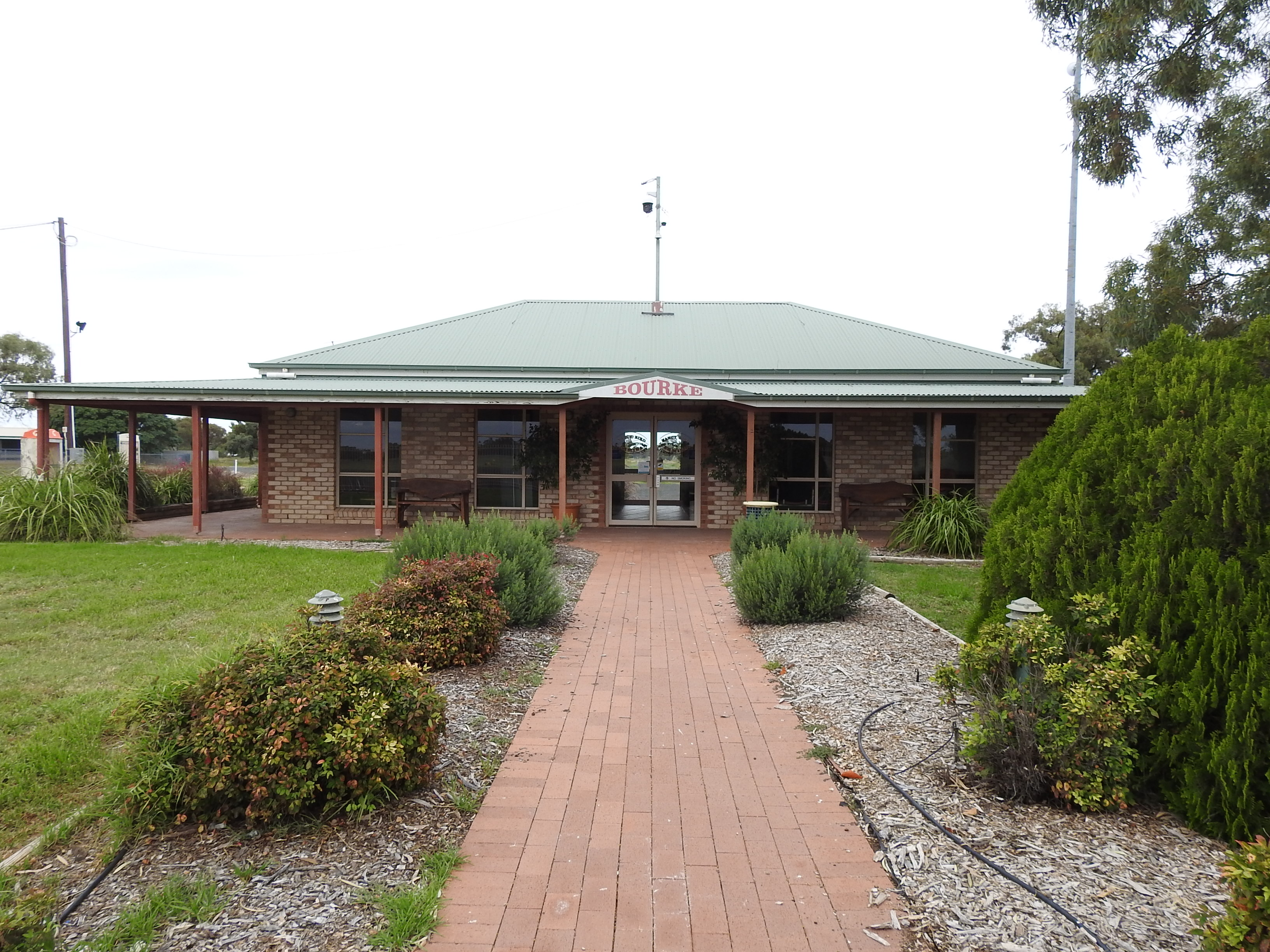
- Airport reception building front in 2021
- IATA: BRK; ICAO: YBKE

Summary
- Airport type: Public
- Location: Bourke, New South Wales
- Elevation AMSL: 352 ft / 107 m
- Coordinates: 30°02′18″S 145°57′06″E
- Website: www.bourke.nsw.gov.au

Map
- Location in New South Wales

Runways
Direction	Length		Surface
Direction	m	ft	Surface
05/23	1,830	6,004	Asphalt
18/36	1,000	3,281	Grass
- Source: AIP Enroute Supplement

Bourke Airport (IATA: BRK, ICAO: YBKE) is an airport located 4 nautical miles (7.4 km; 4.6 mi) north of Bourke, New South Wales, Australia. It is located at an elevation of 352 ft (107 m) above sea level. It has two runways: 05/23, an asphalt runway 1,830 m (6,004 ft) long, and 18/36, a grass runway 1,000 m (3,281 ft) long.

== Facilities ==
As part of the unemployment relief grant from the Civil Aviation Department made money available to build a second runway at the Bourke Aerodrome. The airport was opened for access in 1943 as a base during World War II.

A radio location service was intended to be installed at the airport by August 1946.

In May 1949 a contract was awarded to AWA to install a radar-style distance measuring beacon, with 'DME', an omni-radio range installation.

Butler Air Transport sought to have the airfield upgraded to support a possible change from the Douglas DC-3 to the Vickers Viscount, otherwise the Sydney to Bourke route was not economically viable.

On 7 December 1962, the town turn out to welcome Commonwealth Games high jumper medalist Percy Hobson on his return.

An April 1964 meeting discussing a twenty-four hour service by air ambulance across NSW was met with skepticism as Bourke was not equipped for night landings or radio navigation beacons.

By 1965, Airlines of New South Wales was running flights to and Sydney on Tuesdays, Thursdays and Sundays. Also at this time it was noted:

The engineer at Bourke airport is Percy Weatherilt, 86, the oldest practising aircraft engineer in the world. He still services some 40 private small aircraft which are owned by graziers in the Bourke district and used daily on their properties.

The 1970s saw complaints about the standard of toilet facilities, namely a small block.

The airport was used by the Royal Australian Air Force to bring in supplies during the floods in 1976 and 1990.

== Airlines and destinations ==
Airlines	Destinations
Air Link	Dubbo

== Gallery ==
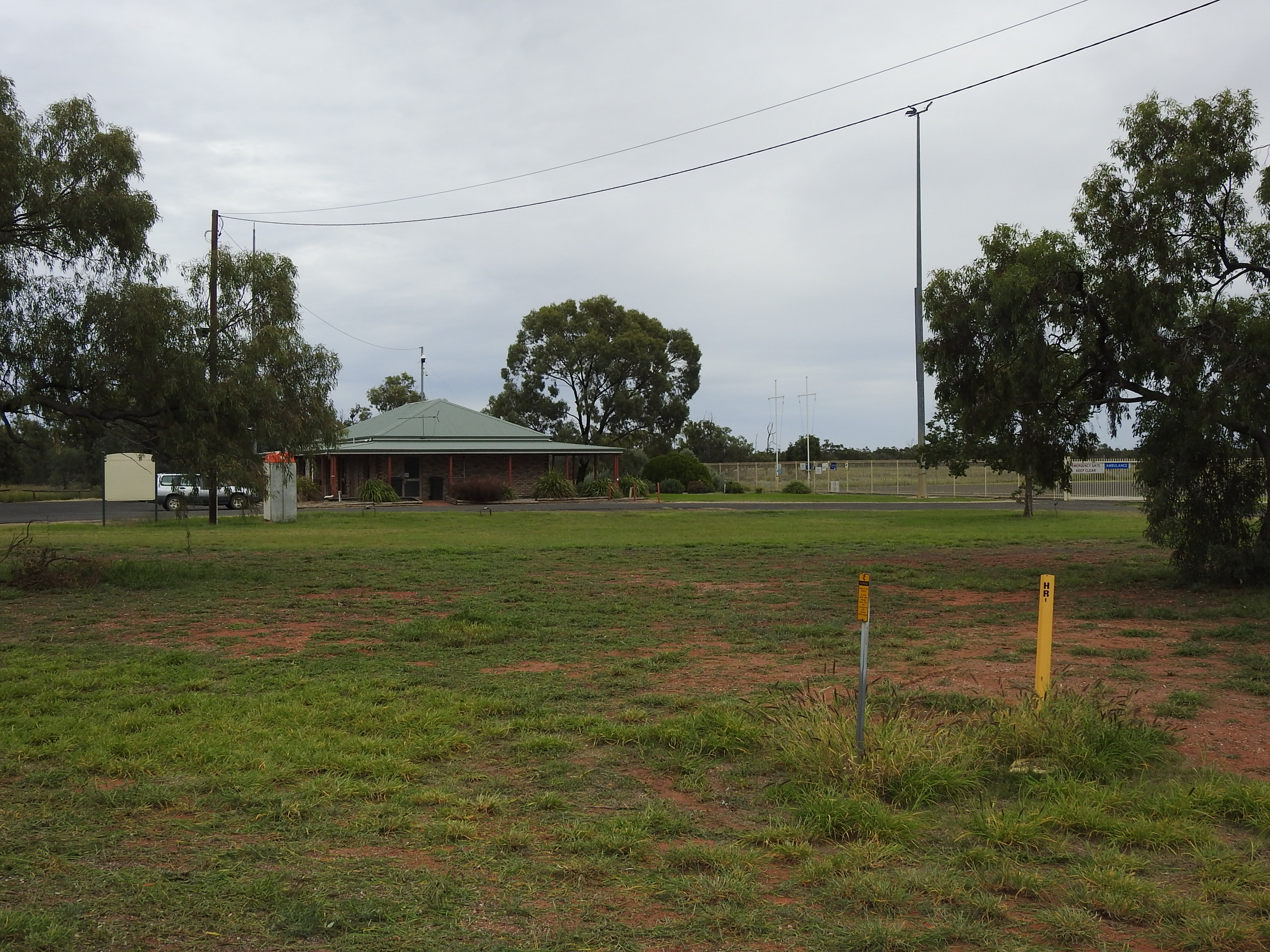
Airport reception building (2021).

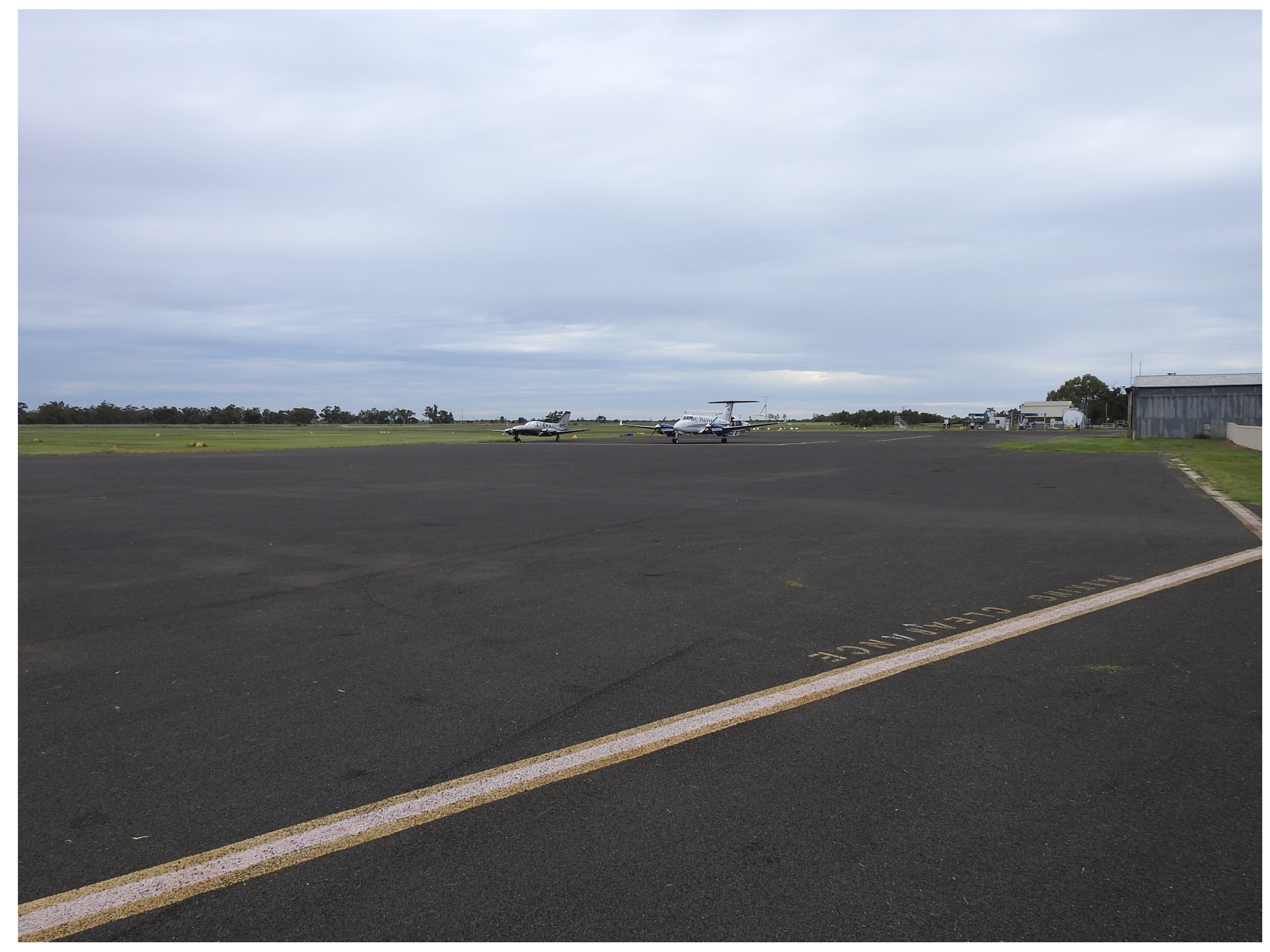
Airport apron (2021).

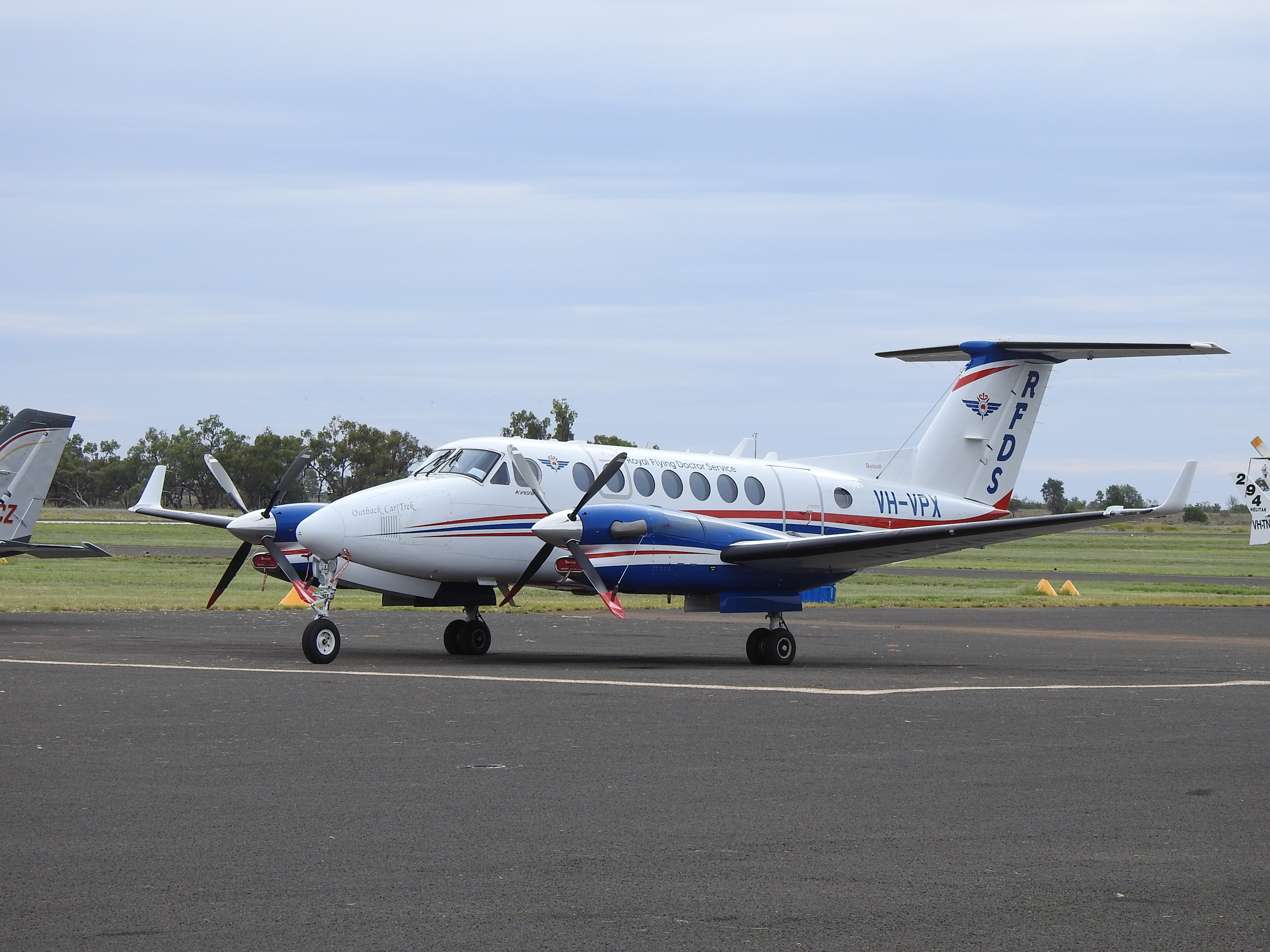
Royal Flying Doctor Service VH-VPX Beech 300 Super King Air 350 (2021).

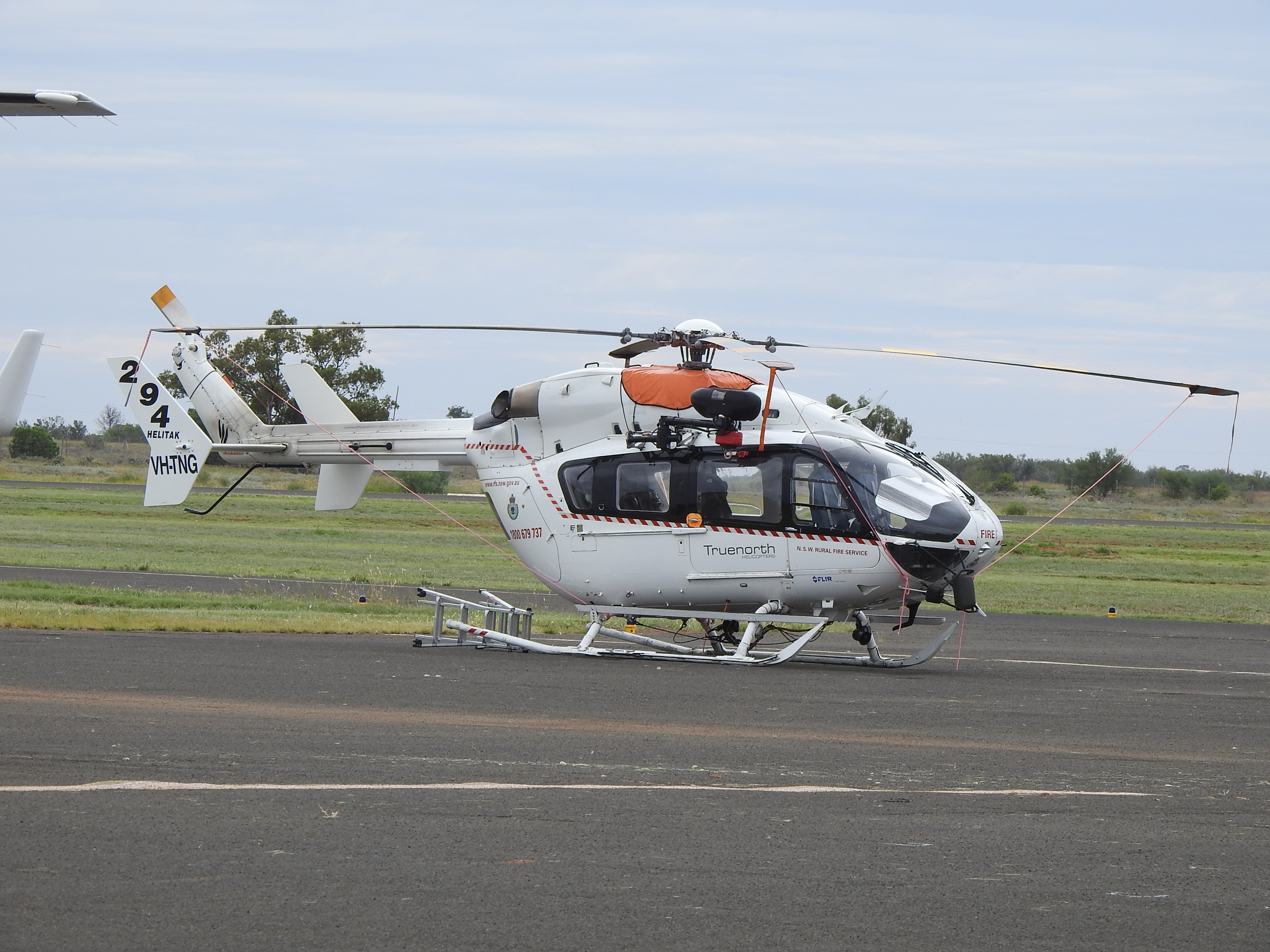
New South Wales Rural Fire Service helicopter (2021).
