= Cecil Butler =

Cecil Butler may refer to:

- Cecil Butler (baseball), American Major League Baseball pitcher
- Cecil Butler (architect), English architect
- Cecil Arthur Butler, Australian businessman
