= Coonamble Airport =

Airport in New South Wales, Australia

- IATA: CNB; ICAO: YCNM

Summary
- Airport type: Public
- Operator: Coonamble Shire Council
- Location: Coonamble, New South Wales
- Elevation AMSL: 604 ft / 184 m
- Coordinates: 30°59′00″S 148°22′30″E

Map
- Location in New South Wales

Runways
Direction	Length		Surface
Direction	m	ft	Surface
05/23	1,527	5,010	Asphalt
12/30	580	1,903	Grass
- Sources: AIP

Coonamble Airport (IATA: CNB, ICAO: YCNM) is an airport located 2 nautical miles (3.7 km; 2.3 mi) south of Coonamble, New South Wales, Australia. The airport is 3 km (1.9 mi) from the Coonamble post office.

== Airlines and destinations ==
There is no regular passenger transport to Coonamble Airport. Prior to 2008 there was an Air Link service to Dubbo.
