= Airlines of New South Wales Pty Ltd v New South Wales (No 2) =

Judgement of the High Court of Australia

- Court: High Court of Australia
- Decided: 3 February 1965
- Citations: [1965] HCA 3, (1965) 113 CLR 54

Case history
- Prior actions: Airlines of NSW Pty Ltd v New South Wales [1964] HCA 2, (1964) 113 CLR 1

Court membership
- Judges sitting: Barwick CJ, McTiernan, Kitto, Taylor, Menzies, Windeyer and Owen JJ

Case opinions
- (6:1) Air Navigation Regulations 198 and 199 were within power, as they promoted the safety of interstate trade and commerce (Barwick CJ, McTiernan, Kitto, Menzies, Windeyer & Owen JJ; Taylor J dissenting) (7:0) Regulation 200B was invalid as it went beyond being a safety measure(Barwick CJ, McTiernan, Kitto, Taylor, Menzies, Windeyer & Owen JJ)

Airlines of New South Wales Pty Ltd v New South Wales (No 2), was a High Court of Australia case about the validity of Commonwealth regulations about intrastate air navigation. Although the Commonwealth has the power to regulate interstate air navigation under s 51(i) of the Constitution, it can only regulate intrastate air navigation under the implied incidental power attached to that head of power. It was held that intrastate air navigation can be regulated to the extent that it provides for the safety of, or prevention of physical interference with, interstate or foreign air navigation.

== Background ==
In October 1964 the Air Navigation Regulations (Cth), were amended to make them apply to intrastate air navigation by the enactment of regulation 6(1)(f). Regulation 198 prohibited the use of an aircraft in regular public transport operations except pursuant to a licence issued by the Director-General of Civil Aviation, who, according to regulation 199(4), will have regard to the "safety, regularity and efficiency of air navigation and to no other matters". Regulation 200B stated that "an airline licence authorizes the conduct of operations in accordance with the provisions of the licence".

The plaintiff, Airlines of New South Wales, had applied unsuccessfully for a licence to perform commercial air operations between Sydney and Dubbo, and then sought to challenge the validity and constitutional consistency of the Air Transport Act 1964 (NSW).

== The decision ==
=== Regulations 198 and 199(4) ===
The Court rejected the American doctrine of commingling that has found favour in the Supreme Court of the United States. Commonwealth legislative power cannot be enlarged to cover intrastate air navigation regardless of the integration of intrastate and interstate activities. However, Commonwealth laws can include intrastate activities within its ambit if for the Commonwealth law to be effective, it must operate indifferently to all activities, whether intrastate or interstate, in the relevant area. In particular, Kitto J stated that "the Australian union is one of dual federalism", and it is the Court's role to preserve such distinctions, however arbitrary; this distinction was also referred to by Dixon CJ in Wragg v State of New South Wales, which was quoted by Barwick CJ in this case. Kitto J continued to state that to ascertain the true character of the law, we examine what it does "in the way of changing or creating or destroying duties or rights or powers".

Furthermore, Barwick CJ reiterated the rejection of the reserved State powers doctrine (see Amalgamated Society of Engineers v Adelaide Steamship Co Ltd). In this instance, the enactment of State laws will not serve to curtail any Commonwealth power; the Commonwealth's power is to be construed from the text of the Constitution.

Section 51(i) permits the Commonwealth to make laws, for interstate and foreign air operations, about safety, regularity and efficiency, as this would protect, foster and encourage interstate and foreign trade and commerce. Barwick CJ stated that this would then serve to extend to include intrastate air navigation, due to intrinsic factors related to flight, and the factual situation in this case. Similarly, the Commonwealth licensing regime, which Barwick CJ held to be a "substantial safety procedure", can apply to intrastate air operations or operators because of the impact of unsafe, inefficient or irregular air operations by intrastate airline operators. Kitto J stated that the law is within power if it protects against physical interference by having regard to safety, regularity and efficiency; this is in contrast to matters merely consequential to interstate or foreign air navigation, which would not suffice.

=== Regulation 200B ===
Barwick CJ contrasted regulations 198 and 199(4) to regulation 200B. In the former, regulation of intrastate navigation was found to be in the Commonwealth's power to safeguard the safety of interstate and foreign air navigation. However, in the latter, the regulation purports to authorise the air operations themselves, as opposed to regulating the use of specified aircraft in those operations. The stimulation or authorisation of those operations that the regulation provides went beyond the regulation being a safety measure.

== See also ==
- Australian constitutional law
