= Air Link =

Australian airline

IATA	ICAO	Call sign
LZ	—	—
- Founded: 1974
- Hubs: Dubbo Regional Airport
- Secondary hubs: Bankstown; Archerfield; Essendon; Cairns
- Fleet size: 21
- Parent company: Aviation Logistics Holdings
- Headquarters: Dubbo, New South Wales, Australia
- Key people: Matthew Kline and Mark Wardrop
- Employees: 50
- Website: www.airlinkairlines.com.au

Air Link is an Australian airline based in Dubbo, New South Wales. It operates air charter services and recommenced regular passenger services in November 2019. As of 2024, Aviation Logistics Holdings (ALH) who owns Air Link, AirMed and Chartair, employs nearly 300 staff and owns and operates 70 aircraft across its seven bases in four states. Aviation Logistics Group operates one of Australia's largest fleet of general aviation aircraft across its subsidiaries and associated companies. Air Link has bases in Dubbo, Brisbane (Archerfield), Sydney (Bankstown), Melbourne (Essendon) and Cairns.

== History ==
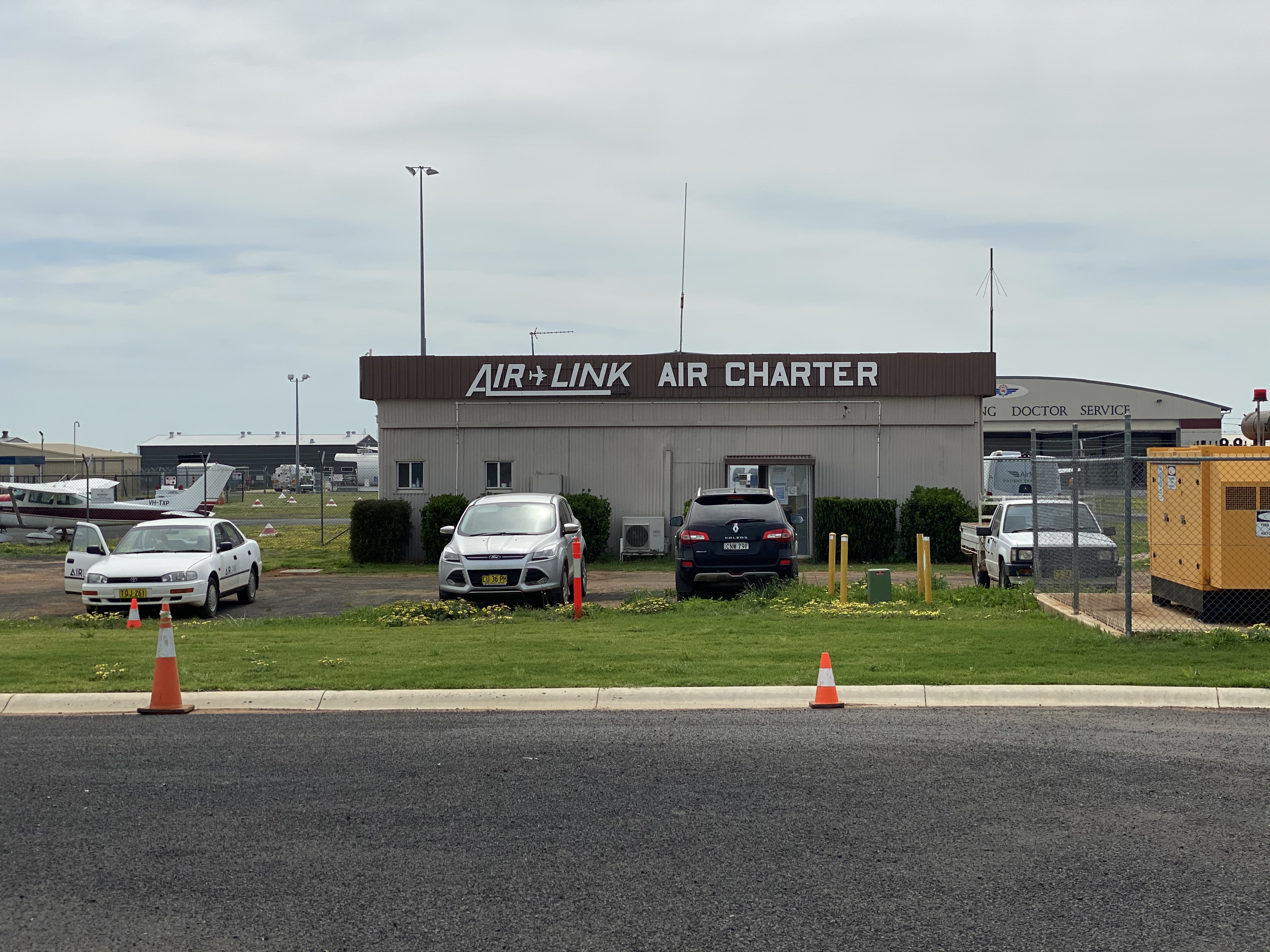
Air Link headquarters at Dubbo Regional Airport

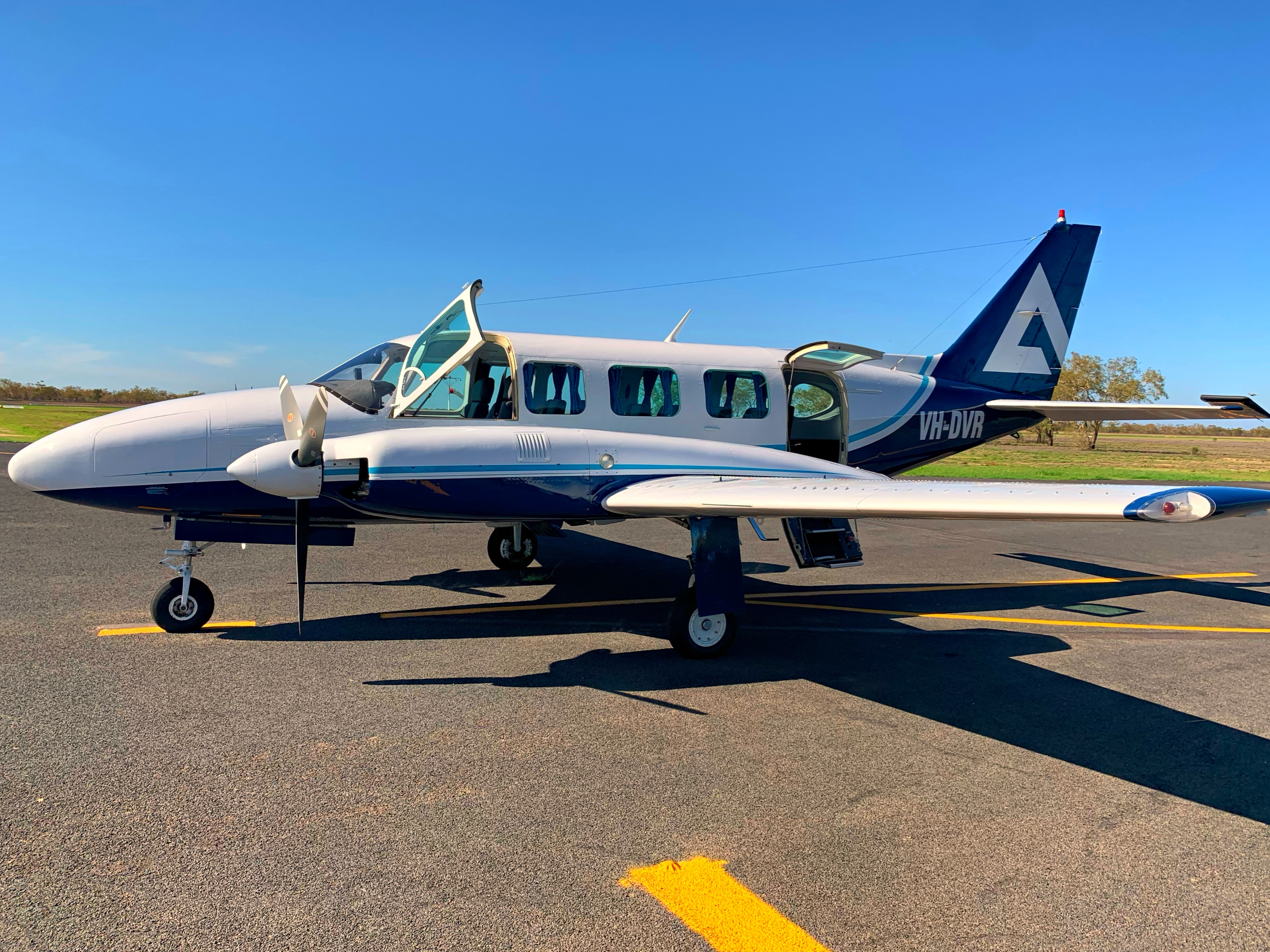
Piper Chieftain at Walgett Airport in the 2019 livery

Air Link was established in by Olaf Weyand in 1974 as an aircraft charter operation based in Dubbo. In 1989 the company was acquired by David and Barbara Miller. Regular regional airline services across western New South Wales were commenced in 1991, when Hazelton Airlines divested itself of its piston-engined aircraft and the routes served by those aircraft. On 30 November 2005 Regional Express Holdings Air Link, with David Miller appointed as Chief Executive, and it was run as an independent airline within the Regional Express group.

On 10 November 2008 Regional Express Holdings announced that Air Link would cease all scheduled operations on 20 December and concentrate on its air charter and aircraft maintenance business. Scheduled services resumed again in 2014 with a daily return service between Dubbo and Sydney operated on behalf of Regional Express Airlines. In 2015, services commenced to Cobar with a Beech 1900D and in December 2017 Air Link ceased these flights.

At the start of 2018 the company ceased all operations for Regional Express, with the sole remaining Beech 1900D sold and soon after suspended all charter flights. In September 2018, Regional Express Holdings sold the Air Link business to Aviation Logistics Holdings. From November 2019, Air Link recommenced regular passenger services with flights to Bourke, Lightning Ridge and Walgett using its Piper Chieftain fleet. From 2019, the fleet has been progressively refurbished, particularly to incorporate the company's new stylised logo.

In 2025, Air Link announced they would construct a new office and maintenance facilities at Dubbo Regional Airport. The facilities include a patient transfer lounge for use by AirMed, as well as a large hangar and new company offices. In September of the same year, Air Link acquired the charter operations of East Air, providing it with an additional base at Cairns Airport in Far North Queensland.

== Destinations ==
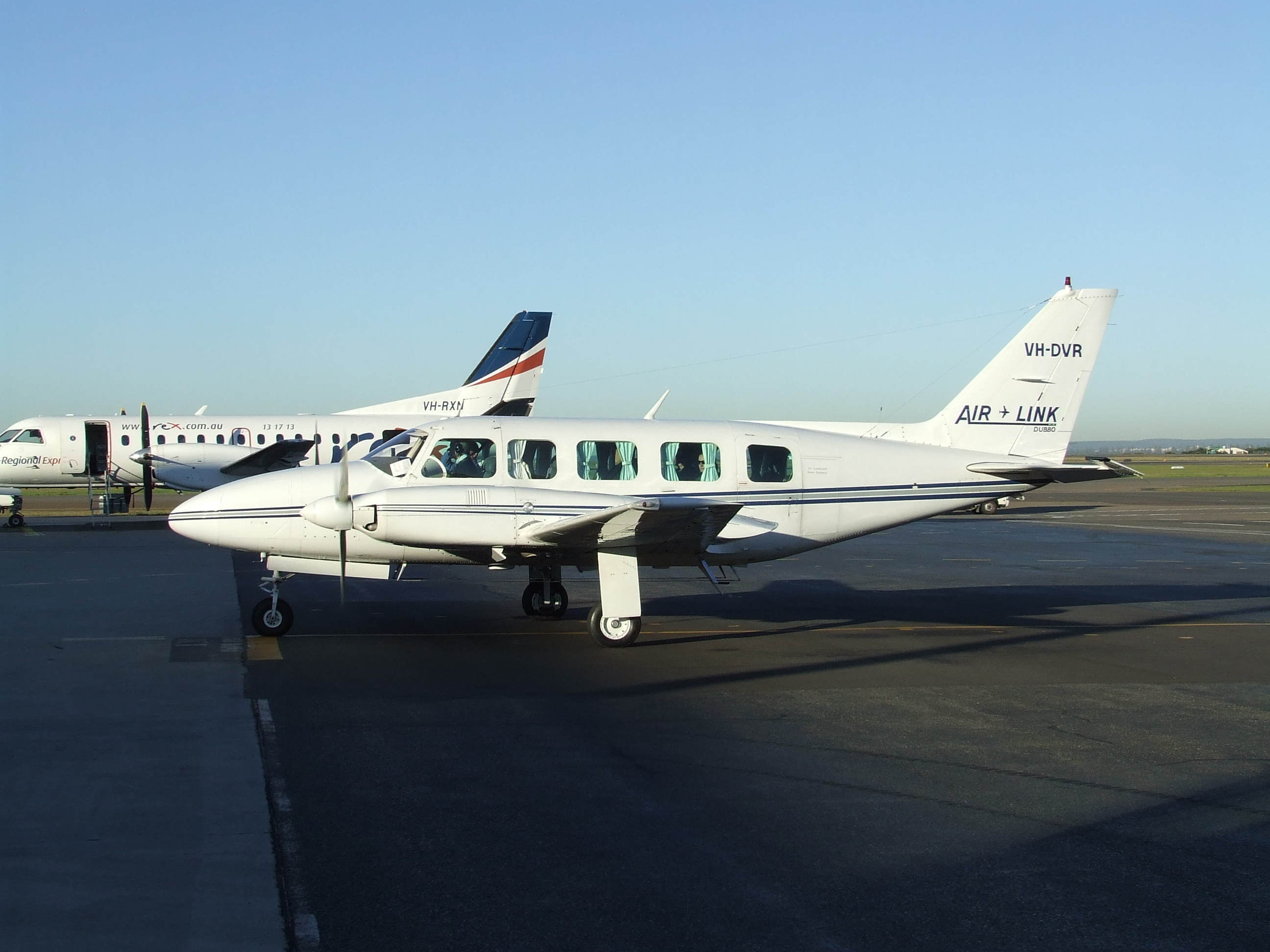
Piper Chieftain in the pre 2019 livery

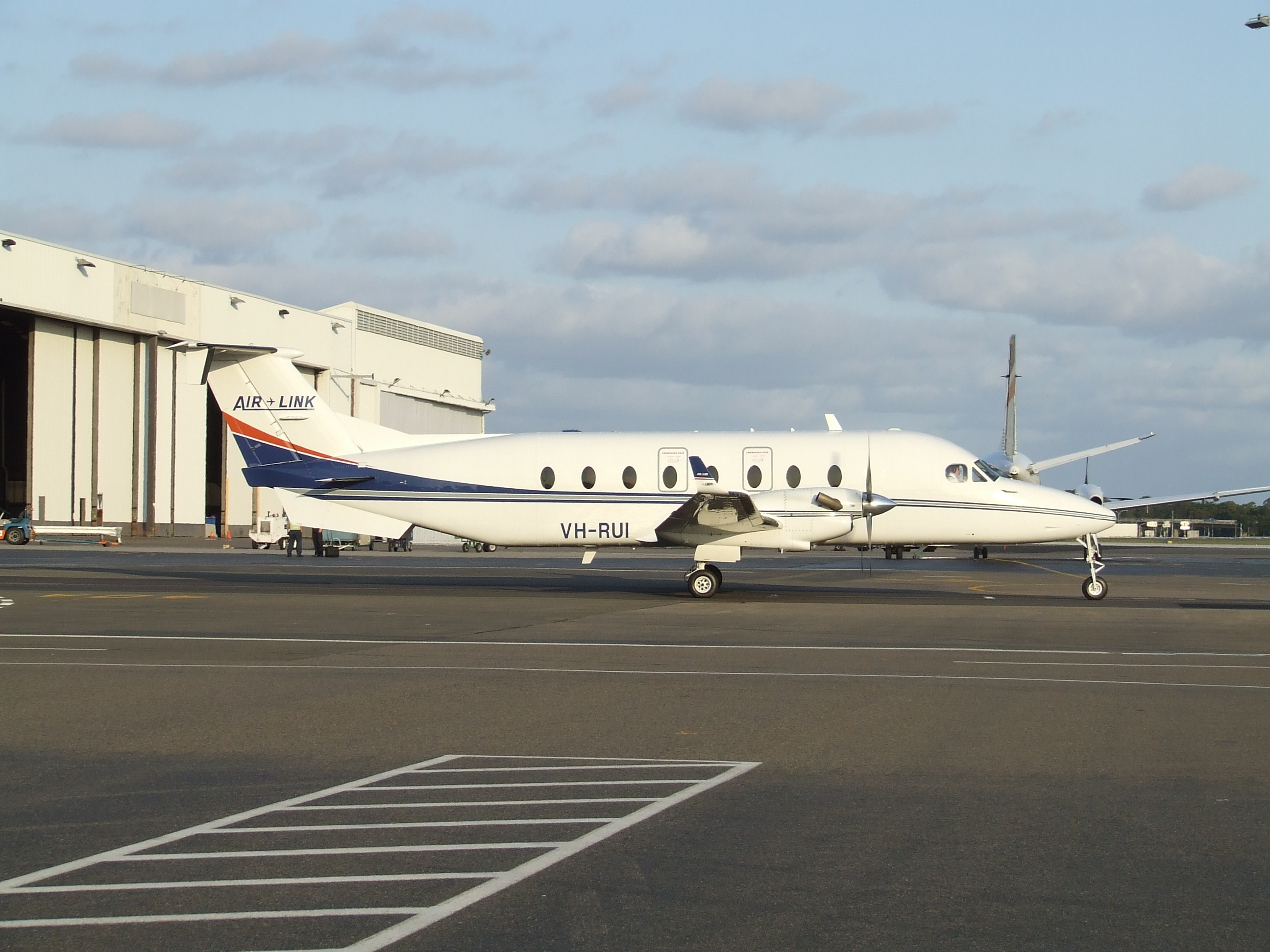
Beech 1900D at Sydney Airport

Prior to the cessation of scheduled services in December 2008, Air Link operated to the following destinations:

- Bathurst
- Bourke
- Cobar
- Coonamble
- Lightning Ridge
- Mudgee
- Sydney
- Walgett

Prior to the second cessation of scheduled services, Air Link operated to the following destinations on behalf of Regional Express Airlines:

- Cobar
- Dubbo
- Sydney

Destinations from the recommencement of services in November 2019:

- Bourke
- Lightning Ridge
- Walgett

== Fleet ==
As of February 2024, the fleet consists of the following aircraft:

Fleet
Aircraft	Number	Notes
Cessna 310R	2	
Piper PA-31-350 Chieftain	10	
Piper PA-31P Mojave	3	Pressurized
Pilatus PC-12	1	
Cessna CJ2+	1	
Cessna Citation Mustang	4	
Cessna Citation Mustang	3	Medical
Beechcraft King Air	2	
Beechcraft Baron	1	

=== Formerly operated ===
- Beechcraft 1900D
- Cessna Citation M2
