= Dubbo Regional Airport =

Airport serving Dubbo, Australia

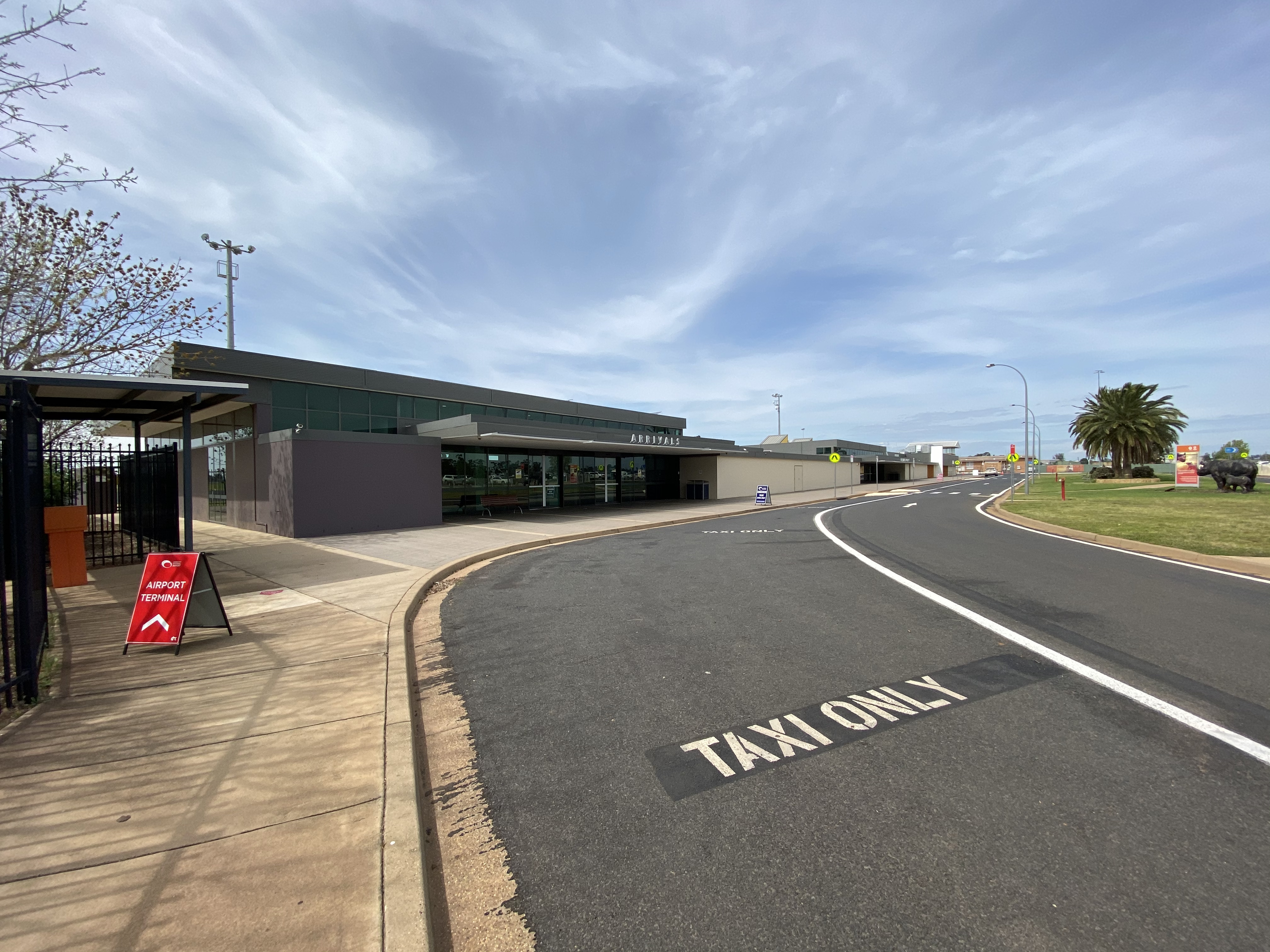
- View of the airport terminal
- IATA: DBO; ICAO: YSDU

Summary
- Airport type: Public
- Operator: Dubbo City Council
- Serves: Dubbo, New South Wales, Australia
- Elevation AMSL: 935 ft (285 m)
- Coordinates: 32°13′00″S 148°34′30″E
- Website: www.dubboairport.com.au/

Map
- Location in New South Wales

Runways
| Direction | Length | | Surface |
| Direction | m | ft | Surface |
|---|---|---|---|
| 05/23 | 1,708 | 5,604 | Asphalt |
| 11/29 | 1,067 | 3,501 | Asphalt |

Statistics (2010–11)
- Revenue passengers: 176,821
- Aircraft movements: 6,899
- Sources: Airservices Australia, BITRE

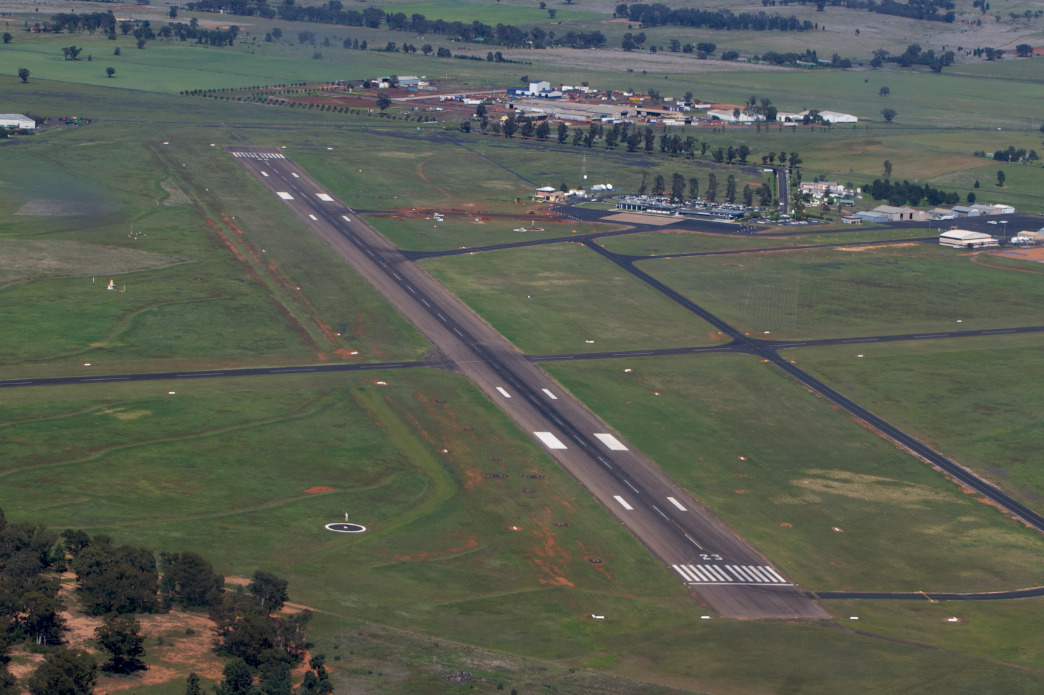
Aerial view of the airport

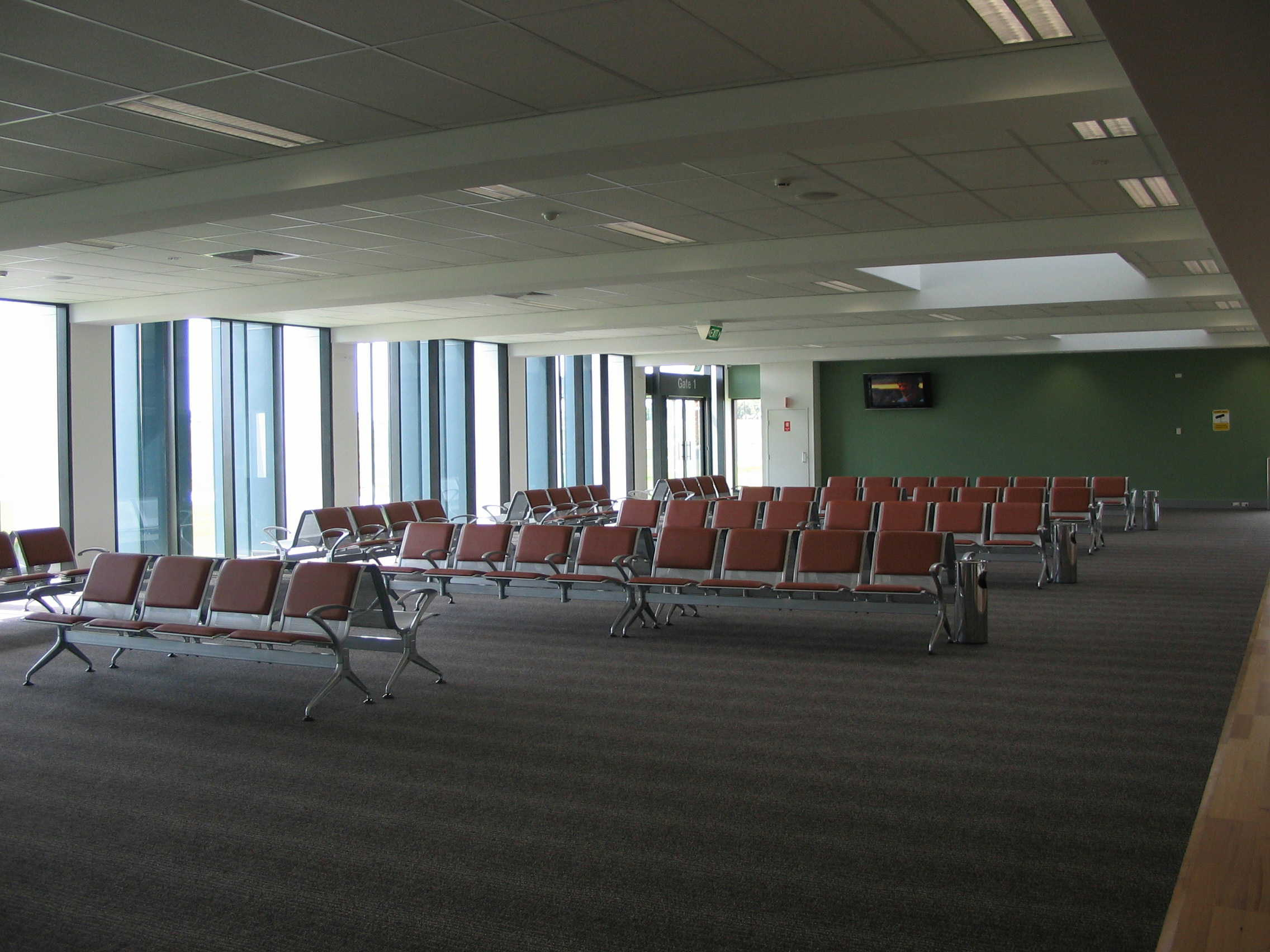
Departure lounge at Dubbo Airport post refurbishment

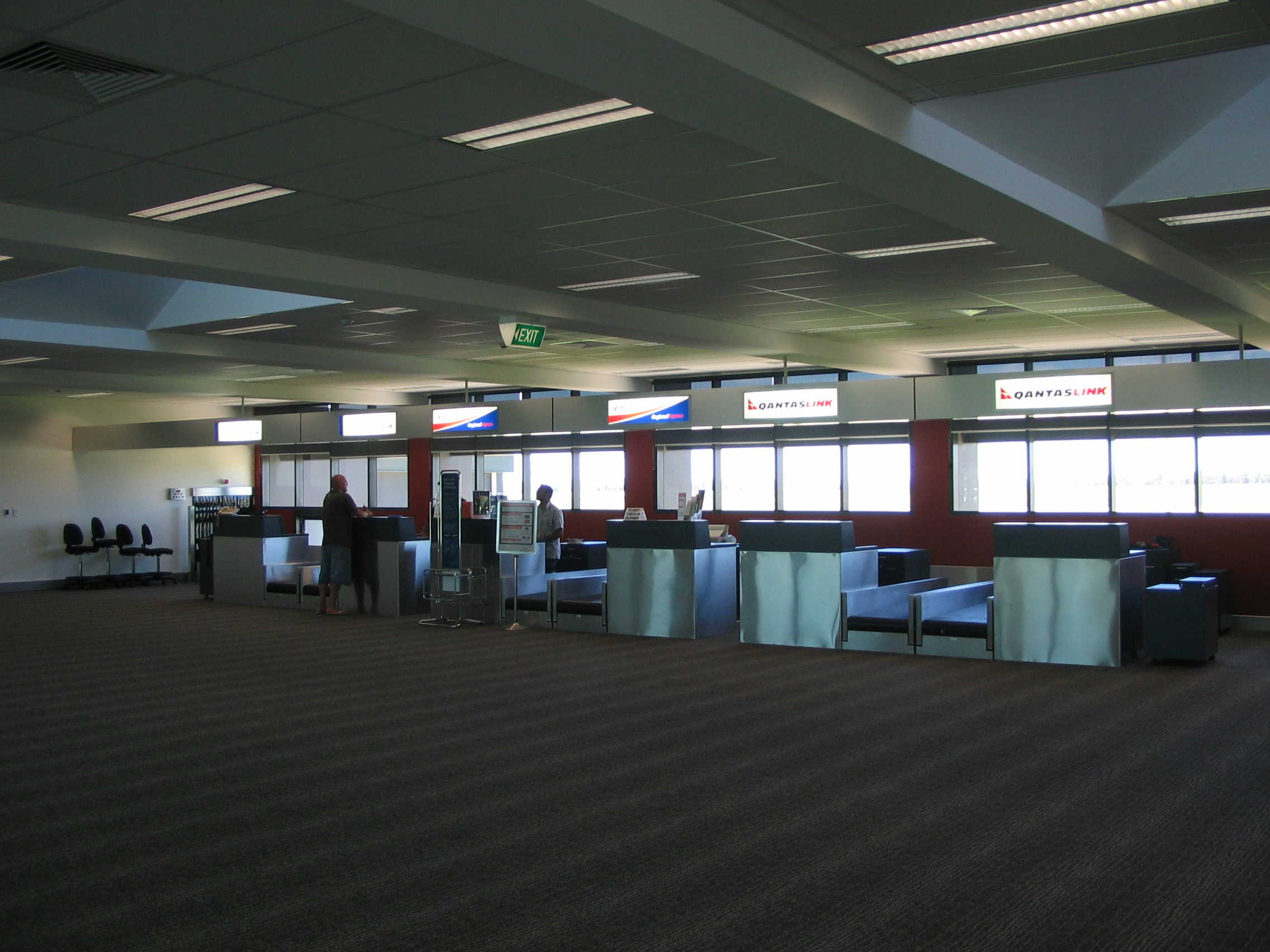
Check in area at Dubbo Airport post refurbishment

Dubbo Regional Airport (IATA: DBO, ICAO: YSDU) is a regional airport in Dubbo, Australia. The airport is located 2 nautical miles (3.7 km; 2.3 mi) northwest of Dubbo and is operated by the Dubbo City Council. It was known as Dubbo City Regional Airport until March 2022.

== History ==
Aeroplanes began landing in Dubbo in the 1920s, though it wasn't until 1935 that land was purchased for an official airport. During World War II, the airport was reconstructed to be a military airport. The airport runway was redone by the Department of Civil Aviation in 1969, and a terminal was opened in 1970. The Dubbo City Council accepted ownership of the airport on 1 July 1970. The airport has been used for scheduled, charter, and freight services since then.

In 1983, Airlines of New South Wales announced that they intended to introduce Fokker F28 Fellowship regional jets on routes to Dubbo. At that time, the Federal Government project that while there would only be a modest increase in the number of aircraft movements between 1985 and 2000, larger aircraft would see the number of passengers handled by the airport in the same period grow from under 70,000 to 103,000.

== Facilities ==
The airport resides at an elevation of 935 ft (285 m) above sea level. It has two asphalt paved runways: 05/23 measuring 1,708 m × 45 m (5,604 ft × 148 ft) and 11/29 measuring 1,067 m × 18 m (3,501 ft × 59 ft).

== Airlines and destinations ==
| Airlines | Destinations |
|---|---|
| Air Link | Bourke, Walgett |
| Link Airways | Brisbane, Melbourne |
| QantasLink | Sydney |
| Rex Airlines | Broken Hill, Sydney |

== Incidents ==
- In April 2010, it was found that the PIN to access the secure areas of the airport such as the tarmac was taped to the gate above the keypad. This was deemed "not acceptable" by Federal Transport Minister Anthony Albanese. Despite this security breach, the airport managed to pass a security audit in 2009.

== Controversy ==
In February 2013, Dubbo City Council (DCC) announced that it would screen all passengers and bags boarding Regional Express and QantasLink aircraft, after QantasLink announced it would introduce the Dash-8 Q400 to the route. DCC would also charge Rex Airlines more than $300,000 per year for the screening, which Rex sees as subsidising QantasLink, after DCC claimed to the Deputy Premier, Andrew Stoner, that it is required under the Air Transport Safety Regulations (ATSR) and that it is inflexible. Rex hit back at the claims that screening was necessary, pointing out that Albury and Wagga Wagga airports allow parallel departures under the ATSR and at Mildura, passengers are screened at no extra cost. Rex lodged an official complaint against DCC with the Australian Competition & Consumer Commission over the screening charge.

The Mayor of Dubbo, Mathew Dickerson, stated that the council wouldn't back down on the screenings and also stating that "I don't want to be the mayor when a Dubbo plane hits the Harbour Bridge because passengers were not screened". Rex announced that would refuse to pay any security screening costs and is planning to re-deploy aircraft used on the Dubbo–Sydney route.

On 14 March 2013, Rex announced that it could cut the weekly services, in response to DCC decision to charge for screening, on the Dubbo–Sydney route from 82 to 73 flights from April 2013 and re-deploying its Dubbo–Sydney aircraft for the Wagga Wagga to Sydney route.

== Statistics ==
Dubbo Airport was ranked 34th in Australia for the number of revenue passengers served in financial year 2018–2019.

Annual passenger and aircraft statistics for Dubbo
| Year | Revenue passengers | Aircraft movements |
|---|---|---|
| 2001–02 | 104,197(−15.8%) | 8,686(−8.2) |
| 2002–03 | 107,576(+3.2%) | 8,916(+2.6%) |
| 2003–04 | 128,560(+19.5%) | 10,236(+14.8%) |
| 2004–05 | 152,943(+19.0%) | 10,550(+3.1%) |
| 2005–06 | 155,805(+1.9%) | 10,826(+2.6%) |
| 2006–07 | 171,026(+9.8%) | 10,294(−4.9%) |
| 2007–08 | 189,883(+11.0%) | 9,470(−8.0%) |
| 2008–09 | 173,032(−8.9%) | 7,397(−21.9%) |
| 2009–10 | 171,339(−1.0%) | 6,627(−10.4%) |
| 2010–11 | 176,821(+3.2) | 6,899(+4.1) |
| 2018–19 | 199,193 | 7,481 |

== See also ==
- List of the busiest airports in Australia
- List of airports in New South Wales
