= Walgett Airport =

- IATA: WGE; ICAO: YWLG

Summary
- Airport type: Public
- Operator: Walgett Shire Council
- Location: Walgett, New South Wales
- Elevation AMSL: 439 ft / 134 m
- Coordinates: 30°02′00″S 148°07′30″E

Map
- Location in New South Wales

Runways
Direction	Length		Surface
Direction	m	ft	Surface
05/23	1,626	5,335	Asphalt
18/36	1,153	3,783	Grass
- Sources: Australian AIP and aerodrome chart

Walgett Airport (IATA: WGE, ICAO: YWLG) is an airport in Walgett, New South Wales, Australia.

== Airlines and destinations ==
Airlines	Destinations
Air Link	Dubbo, Lightning Ridge

== See also ==
- List of airports in New South Wales
