= Cobar Airport =

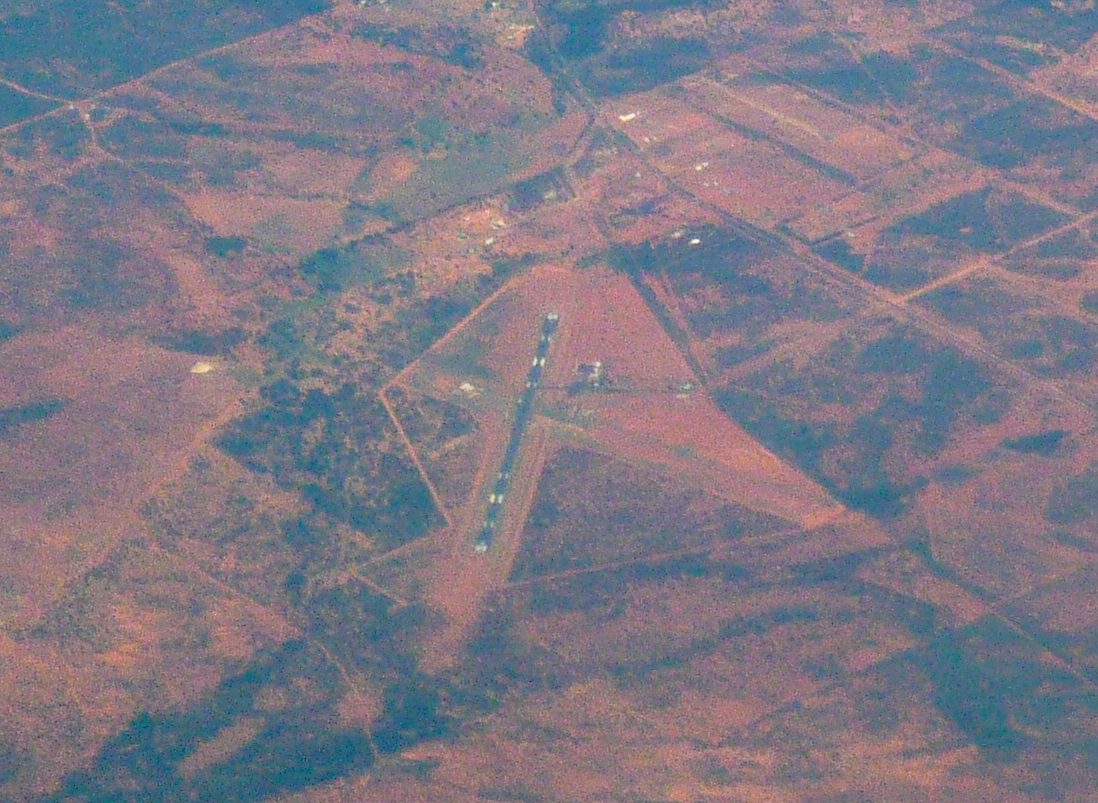
- Aerial image, 6 March 2009
- IATA: CAZ; ICAO: YCBA

Summary
- Airport type: Public
- Operator: Cobar Shire Council
- Serves: Cobar, New South Wales, Australia
- Elevation AMSL: 724 ft (221 m)
- Coordinates: 31°32′18″S 145°47′36″E

Map
- Location in New South Wales

Runways
Direction	Length		Surface
Direction	m	ft	Surface
05/23	1,519	4,984	Asphalt
17/35	1,221	4,006	Clay
- Sources: Enroute Supplement Australia from Airservices Australia

Cobar Airport (IATA: CAZ, ICAO: YCBA) is an airport located 3 nautical miles (5.6 km; 3.5 mi) southwest of Cobar, a town in the Australian state of New South Wales.

== Facilities ==
The airport is 724 ft (221 m) above mean sea level. It has two runways: 05/23 with an asphalt surface measuring 1,519 by 30 metres (4,984 ft × 98 ft) and 17/35 with a clay surface measuring 1,221 by 30 metres (4,006 ft × 98 ft).

== Airlines and destinations ==
Airlines	Destinations
FlyPelican	Sydney

== Accidents and incidents ==
- On 23 April 2023, Pel-Air Flight 9982 diverted to Cobar after the crew received a cargo area smoke warning and shortly after, observed smoke in the cockpit. The SAAB 340A was operating a cargo flight from Wagga Wagga to Charleville. On landing, the aircraft was met by local fire fighters who entered the cabin to investigate the source, which was found to be electrical and extinguished. The aircraft's floor was significantly damaged by the fire.

== See also ==
- List of airports in New South Wales

== Gallery ==
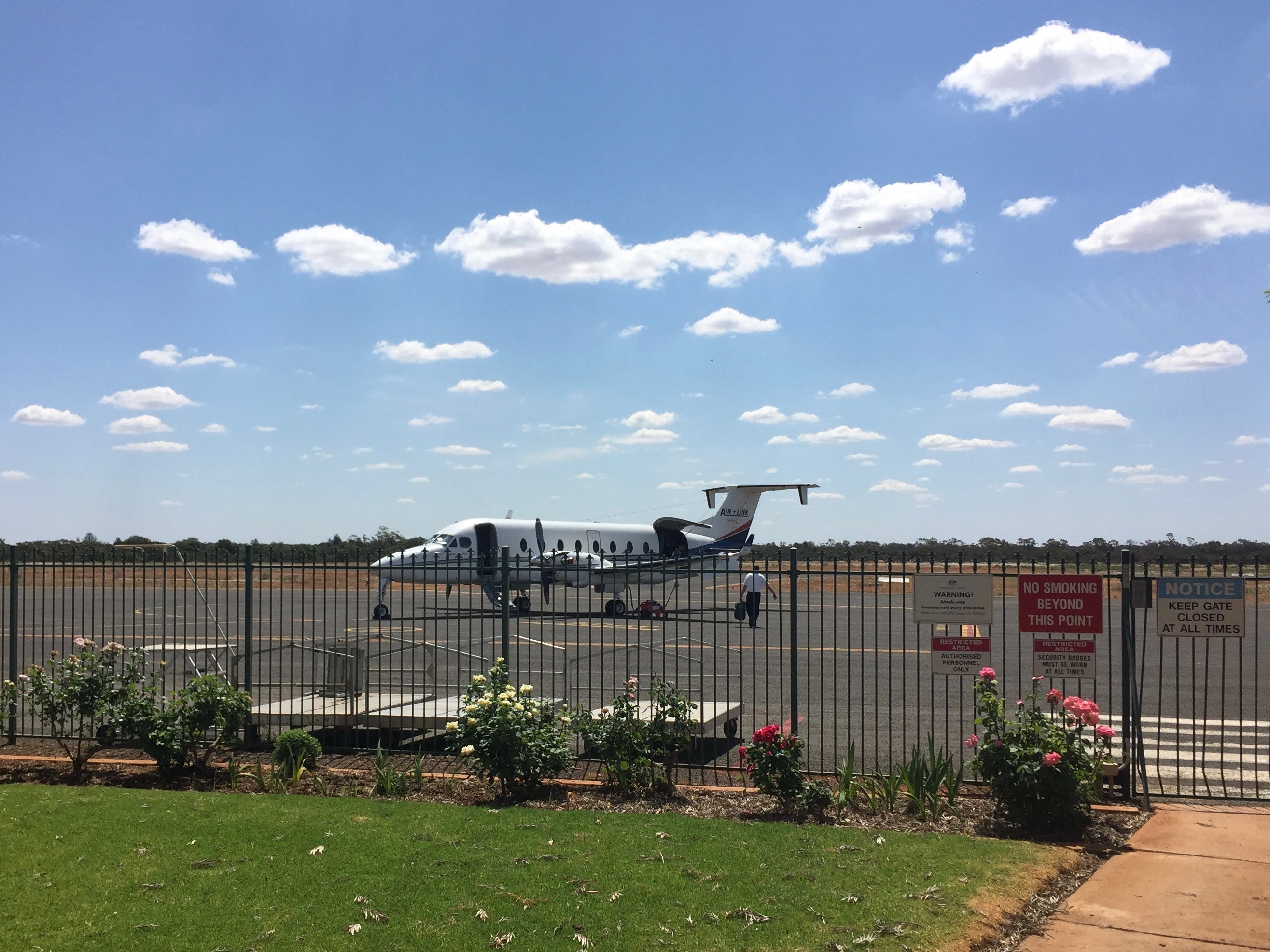
Beechcraft 1900D of Air Link parked on the apron at Cobar airport

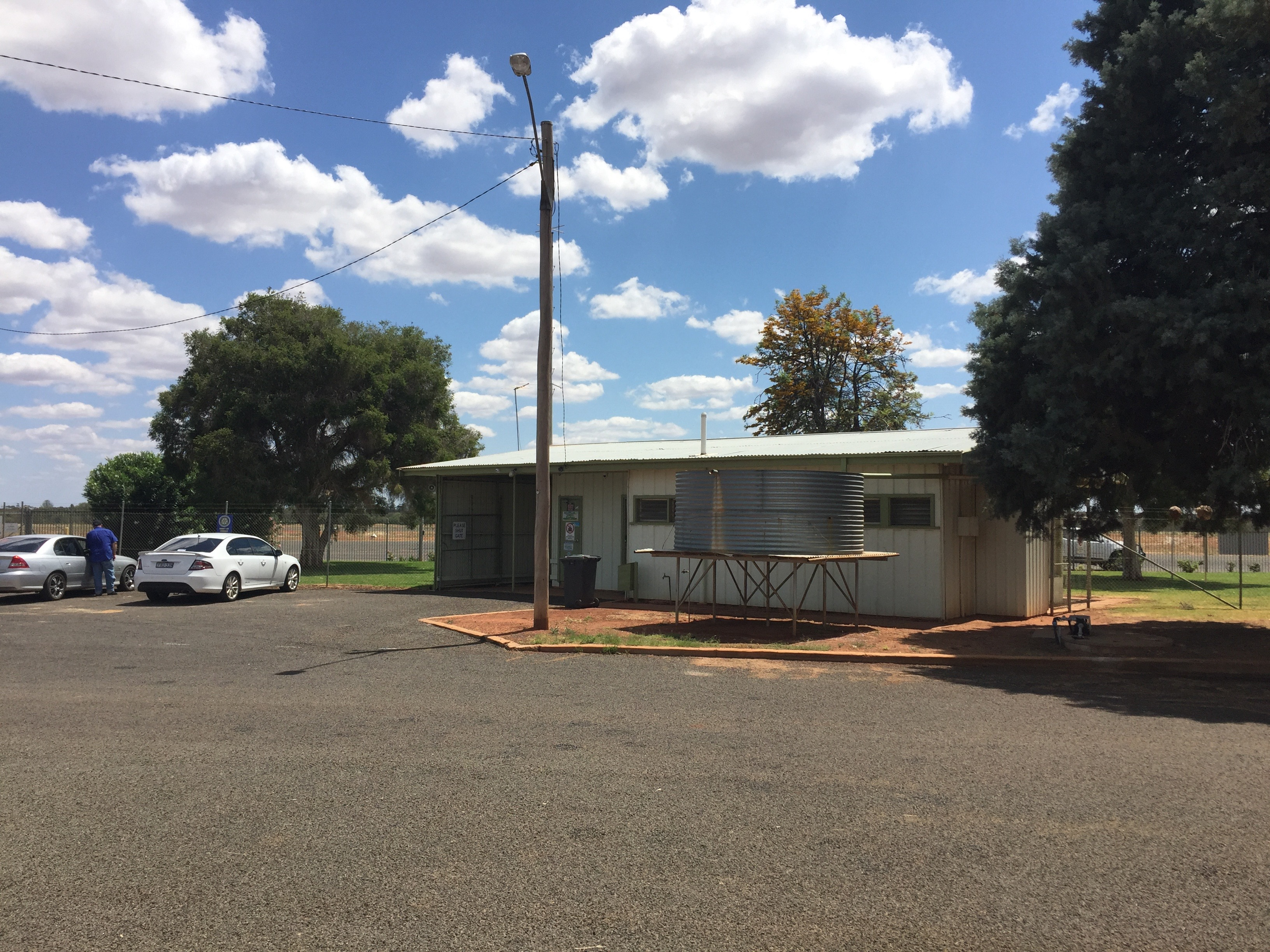
Cobar airport terminal building
