= Lightning Ridge Airport =

- IATA: LHG; ICAO: YLRD

Summary
- Airport type: Public
- Operator: Walgett Shire Council
- Location: Lightning Ridge, New South Wales, Australia
- Elevation AMSL: 540 ft / 165 m
- Coordinates: 29°27′24″S 147°59′06″E

Map
- Location in New South Wales

Runways
Direction	Length		Surface
Direction	m	ft	Surface
10/28	1,406	4,613	Asphalt/gravel
04/22	733	2,405	Gravel
- Source: AIP ERSA

Lightning Ridge Airport (IATA: LHG, ICAO: YLRD) is an airport located 2 nautical miles (3.7 km; 2.3 mi) south southwest of Lightning Ridge, New South Wales, Australia.

== Airlines and destinations ==
Airlines	Destinations
Air Link	Walgett

== See also ==
- List of airports in New South Wales
