= Butler Air Transport =

1934–1959 airline in Australia

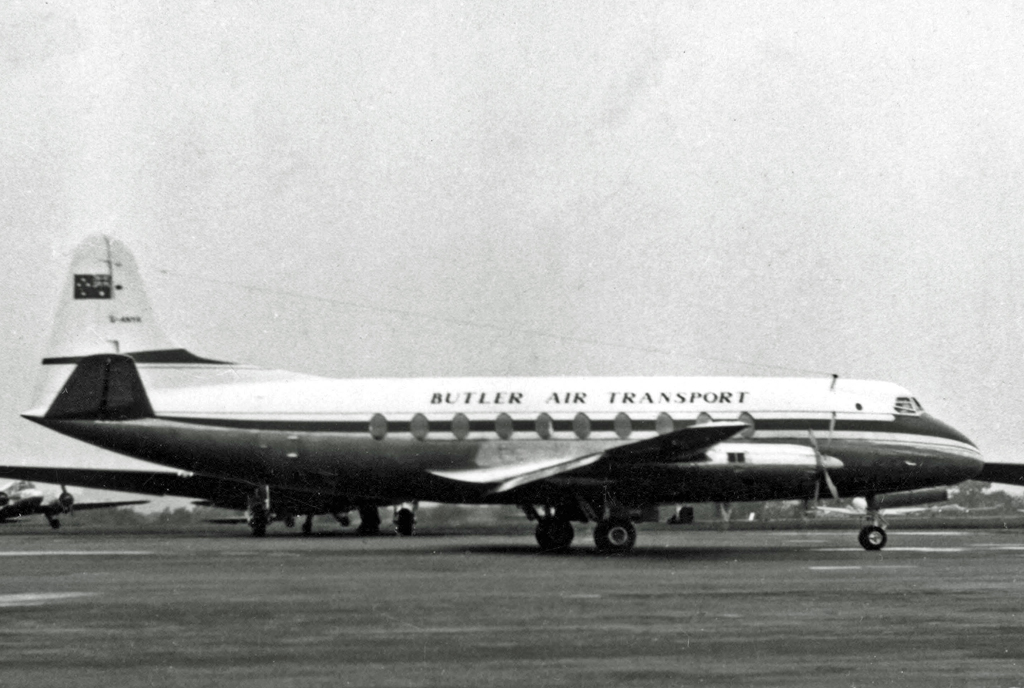
- Butler Air Transport Vickers Viscount at Blackbushe Airport in 1956 shortly before delivery to Australia
- Commenced operations: 1934; 92 years ago
- Ceased operations: 1959; 67 years ago

Butler Air Transport was an Australian airline founded by Arthur Butler to operate air transport primarily among New South Wales airports in Australia, from 1934 until 1959.

== History ==
Arthur Butler was an English-Australian aviator whose first aviation experience was as a toolmaker and later ground engineer in Sydney then Hay. Butler was engineer to pilot Francis Stewart Briggs who taught Butler to fly at Hay. After getting a pilot's license, he became a barnstormer before, in 1934, winning the contract for the Charleville to Cootamundra leg of the England-Australia airmail route. Butler Air Transport Co lost the contract upon its expiry in 1938, but went on to operate as a civil airline, serving country towns in New South Wales and Queensland.

During World War II Butler Air Transport continued operating on a limited scale and also manufactured parts for the Australian war effort on a cost-recovery basis. At the end of the war, Butler registered Butler Air Transport Pty Ltd as a public company. It became the most successful airline in New South Wales, operating three Douglas DC-3s, Avro Ansons, De Havilland Herons and three Airspeed Ambassadors.

Butler encouraged employee ownership of the company, and in 1947, they owned 51 per cent.

In the late 1940s, the Chifley Labor Government sought to nationalise the airlines. In the early 1950s the coalition government abandoned nationalisation and instead adopted the Two Airlines Policy favouring Ansett Australia and Trans-Australia Airlines. Arthur Butler fought against the trend, including an intended buy-out in the early 1950s by Australian National Airways. In 1955 Butler acquired two Vickers Viscounts. Ansett Transport Industries acquired Australian National Airways in 1957, thus acquiring appreciable stock in Butler Air Transport, then acquired more from staff stockholders until it controlled Butler. Despite a legal and boardroom battle to retain or regain control, Arthur Butler lost. In late 1958, Butler was offered the position of managing director but instead left the company, which was effectively absorbed into Ansett as Airlines of New South Wales in 1959, then into Ansett Express.

== Destinations ==
Butler Air Transport operated to the following airports:

Butler Air Transport destinations
| From | To | Commenced | Times | Aircraft | Fares (1-way) | Reference |
|---|---|---|---|---|---|---|
| Sydney | Bathurst | 16 December 1946 | 1100 | Douglas 21 seat | £1/10/0 | |
| Sydney | Bega | | | | | |
| Sydney | Bourke | | | | | |
| Sydney | Brewarrina | | | | | |
| Sydney | Casino | | | | | |
| Sydney | Charleville | | | | | |
| Sydney | Coffs Harbour | | | | | |
| Sydney | Coonamble | | | | | |
| Sydney | Cunnamulla | | | | | |
| Sydney | Dubbo | | | | | |
| Sydney | Evans Head (Lismore) | | | | | |
| Sydney | Grafton | | | | | |
| Sydney | Nyngan | | | | | |
| Sydney | Parkes | | | | | |
| Sydney | Tooraweenah (Gilgandra & Coonabarabran) Local knowledge said that Tooraweenah was the home town of Butler's wife. He made it the hub for the surrounding airports, in a "Hub and Spoke" operation. Early on, a Dragon Rapide and two de Havilland Heron Mk Is (VH-AHB and VH-ARB) took passengers from, e.g. Coonamble to Tooraweenah, where they transferred to a DC-3 for the rest of the journey to Sydney. The Herons also operated other routes, e.g. Sydney – Forster. | | | | | |
| Sydney | Walgett | | Sydney to Wilcannia. | | | |
