= Cecil Butler (architect) =

English architect

Cecil Butler (1897-1947) was an English architect who was closely associated with the development of Hampstead Garden Suburb.

Butler was architect to the Co-partnership Tenants for the suburb from 1923 to 1928, when he designed Neale Close, Midholm Close, and 34A-72 Hill Top. He also designed flats and shops in Lyttelton Court and Falloden Way. From 1939 to 1941 he was a partner at Shayles, Butler & Dilke in Shrewsbury. From 1942 to 1945 he worked at the Lands Department of the War Office.
