= Cecil Arthur Butler =

English-born Australian aviator and airline owner

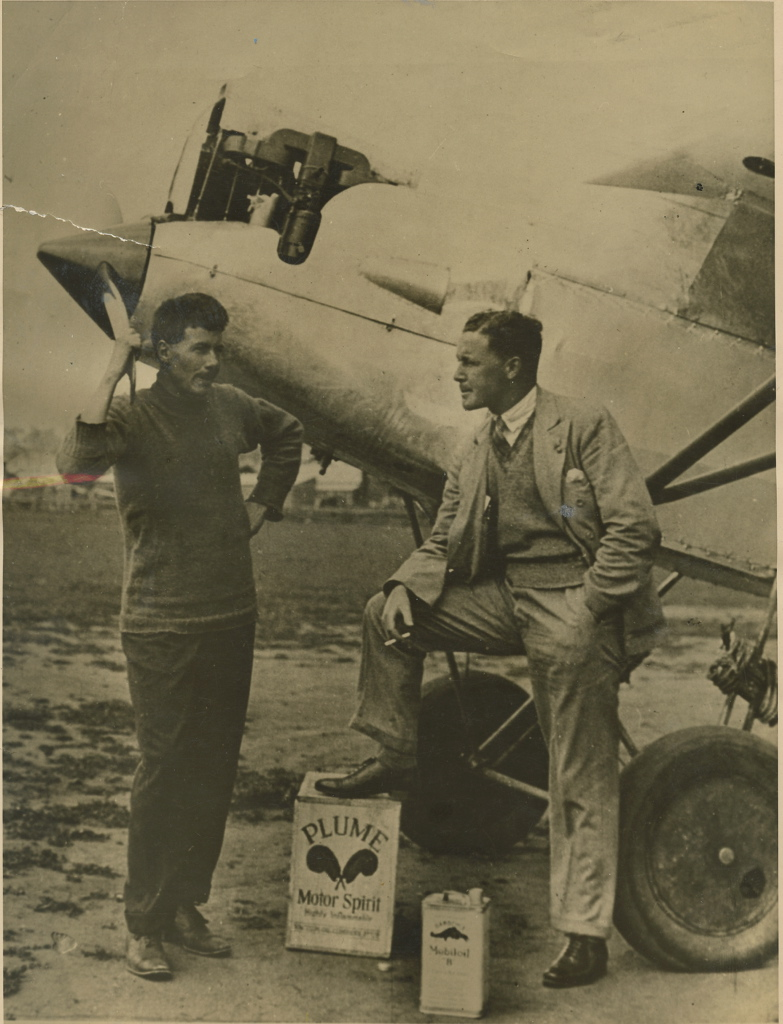
- Born: 8 June 1902
- Died: 13 April 1980 (aged 77)
- Occupation: Aircraft pilot
- Awards: Officer of the Order of the British Empire (1958)

Cecil Arthur Butler (8 June 1902 – 13 April 1980), commonly known as Arthur or C. Arthur Butler, was an Australian businessman who established Butler Air Transport Co.

Butler was born in Warwickshire, England, and migrated to Australia with his family in about 1910. In 1917 he was apprenticed to become a tool, jig and gauge maker at the Lithgow Small Arms Factory. In 1921 he transferred to the Australian Aircraft & Engineering Co. Ltd at Mascot, Sydney. In 1923 he obtained his ground engineer's licence, and in 1927 his pilot's licence.

In 1930 he designed, built and tested a small, all-metal, high-winged monoplane. In 1931, he piloted a Comper Swift from England to Australia in the record time of 9 days, 1 hour and 40 minutes. In 1934 with the financial help of his wife's uncle, P. S. Garling, he won the tender for the Charleville (Queensland) to Cootamundra (New South Wales) leg of the England-Australia airmail route, servicing the route with DH.84 Dragon aircraft. Four years later, with the successful completion of the contract, his company, Butler Air Transport Co. continued as a civil airline, serving centres in New South Wales and Queensland. The airline later became Airlines of New South Wales.

== Recognition ==
- In 1958 he became an Officer of the Order of the British Empire (OBE)
- The terminal building at Cootamundra Aerodrome was named for him in 2007.

== Gallery ==
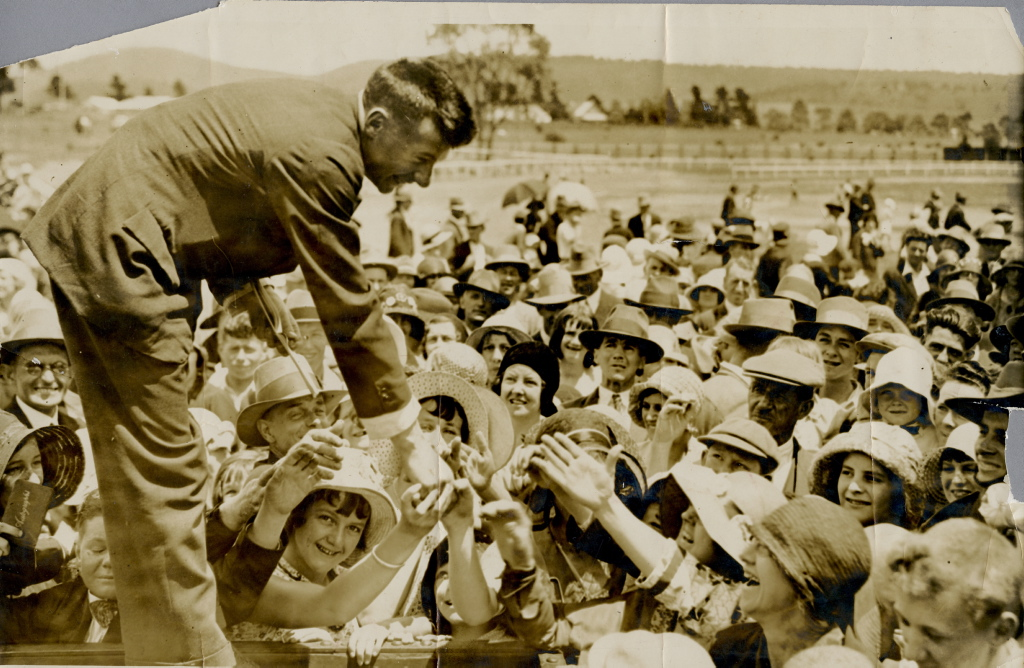
Butler being congratulated by crowd at Lithgow, after his England-Australia record breaking flight

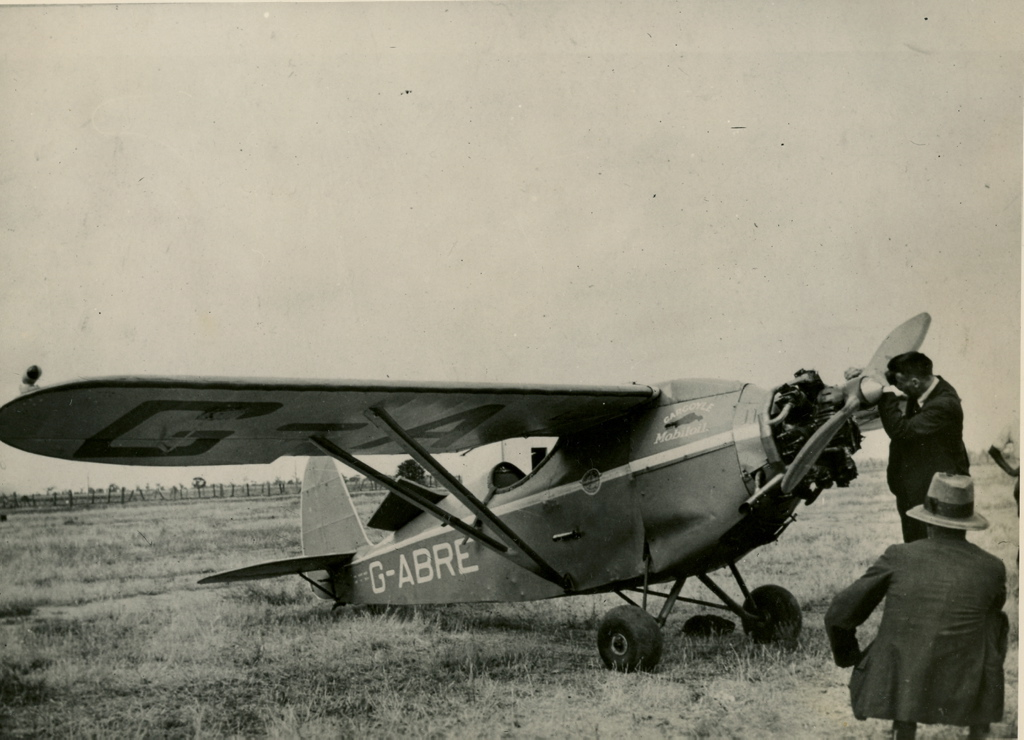
Butler and the Comper Swift, 1931

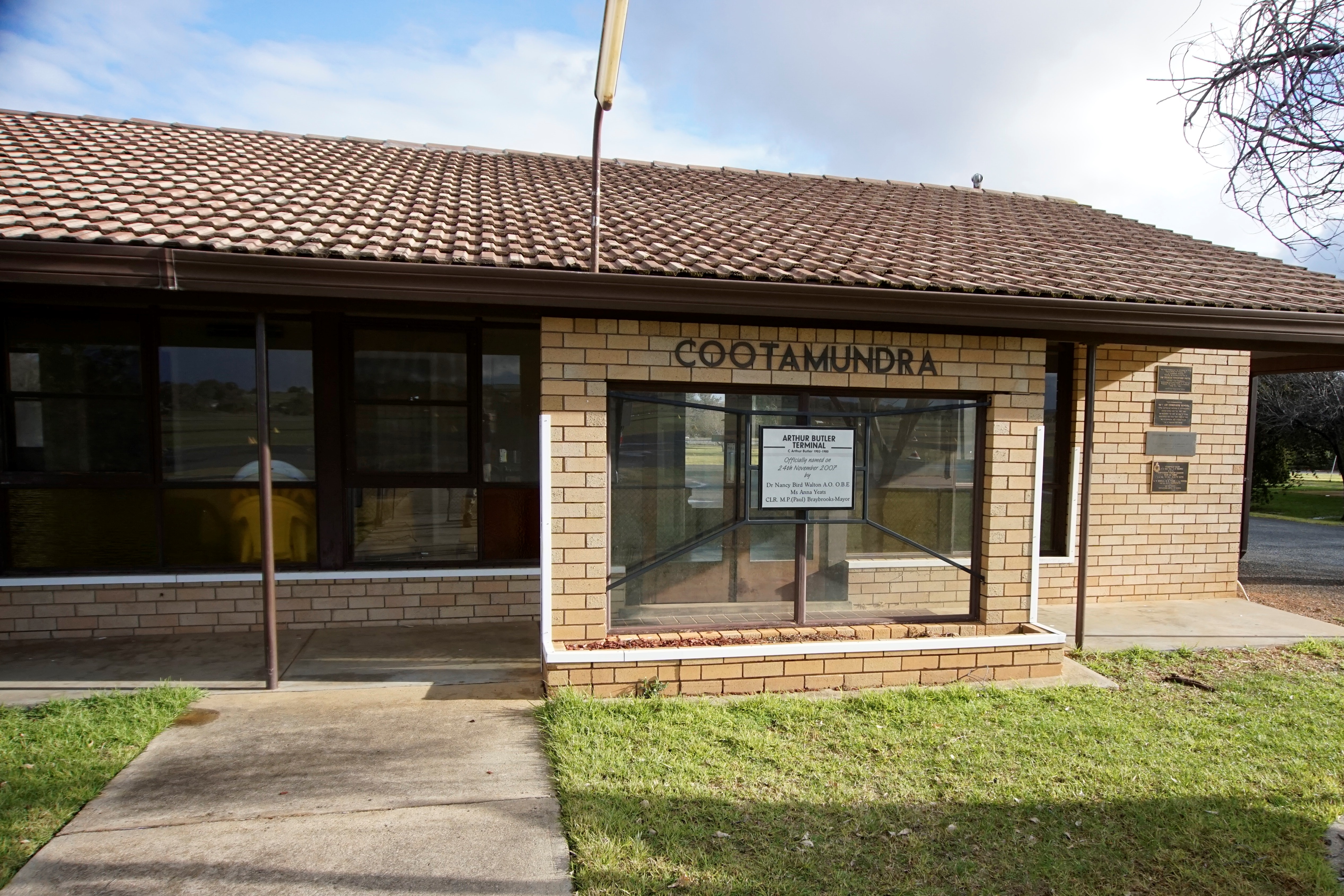
Cootamundra terminal

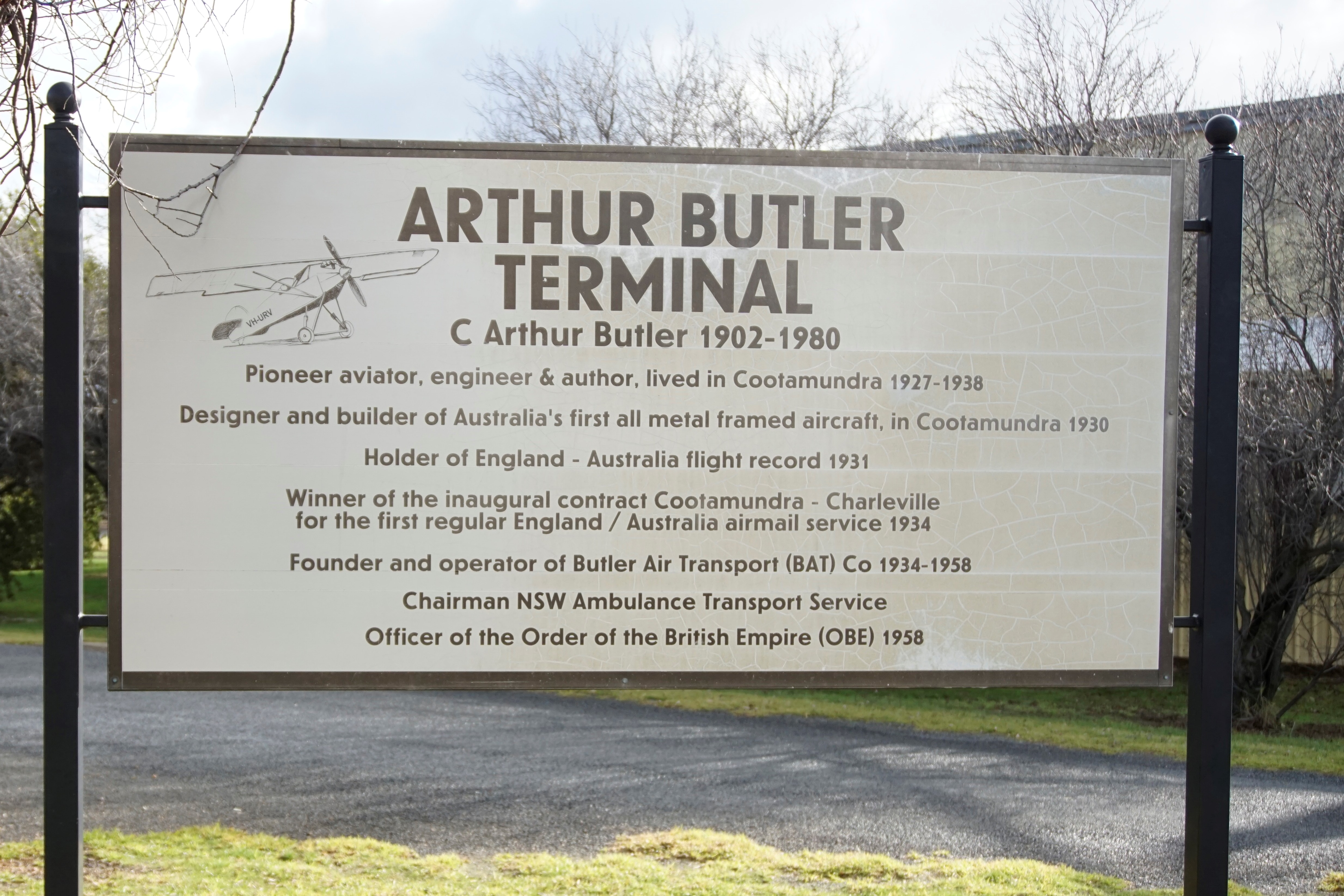
Sign at Cootamundra

== Publications ==
- C. Arthur Butler, Flight : memoirs, 1912-1958, Wikidata Q108355035
- C. Arthur Butler (1971), Flying start : the history of the first five decades of civil aviation in Australia, Wikidata Q108354444

== See also ==
Butler Air Transport for the story of the civil airline he founded and managed.
