= Airlines of New South Wales =

Australian domestic regional airline

IATA	ICAO	Call sign
WX	—	NEWSOUTH
- Commenced operations: 1959
- Ceased operations: 1993
- Key people: Reg Ansett

Airlines of New South Wales (also known as Air New South Wales, Ansett NSW and Ansett Express) callsign "NEWSOUTH" was an Australian domestic regional airline that operated from 1959 until its merger into Ansett in 1993. It was formed by Reg Ansett's takeover of Butler Air Transport. Airlines of New South Wales operated air passenger services in New South Wales, and later in other Australian states. In 1964–65 the airline fought a High Court case, Airlines of New South Wales Pty Ltd v New South Wales (No 2), that was significant in adjudicating the spheres of constitutional power of the national and state governments in respect of air navigation.

== History ==
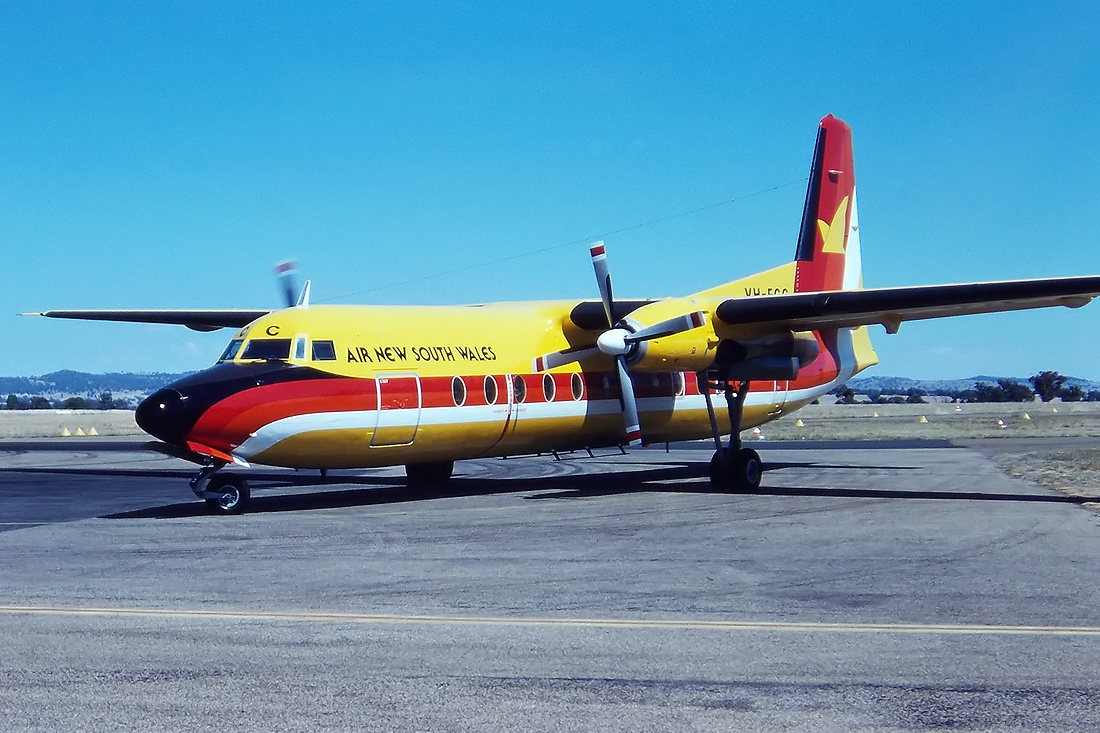
Air New South Wales Fokker F27-500F in the Canary livery, at Wagga Wagga Airport in 1982

In the late 1950s, Reg Ansett was expanding the operations of his company, Ansett Transport Industries (ATI), in the Australian domestic aviation market. Ansett wanted to acquire Arthur Butler's company, Butler Air Transport, but Butler refused a deal that would have given Butler a seat on ATI's board. Ansett had already acquired a 40 percent interest in Butler Air Transport when he had purchased the ailing Australian National Airways in 1957. Reg Ansett, in what one author described as "a spectacular initiative", then used nine of his own aircraft to fly Ansett nominee shareholders to a Butler Air Transport meeting, taking over the company from Arthur Butler. After a legal battle, Ansett gained full control of Butler Air Transport in 1958. The company was renamed as Airlines of New South Wales on 17 December 1959, and flew its first commercial flight on 19 December that year. The airline operated services from Sydney to regional New South Wales centres, and later to other Australian cities. In 1964, Airlines of New South Wales was a subsidiary of Ansett Transport Industries. In 1968 or 1969 it was renamed Ansett Airlines of New South Wales, which at the time of the Australian government's 1978 Domestic Air Policy Transport Review was one of five regional airlines operating in Australia. In 1981 the airline was renamed Air New South Wales; in March 1990 it was renamed Ansett NSW and later that year it was again re-badged as Ansett Express, which in 1993 was merged into Ansett, ending Airlines of New South Wales' history as a separate entity.

In addition to providing scheduled passenger services, the airline also conducted tourist operations, with actor Steve Dodd working for it as a guide in central Australia in the late 1960s and early 1970s.

=== High Court case ===
In the 1960s, Airlines of New South Wales was at the centre of an Australian High Court case about the powers of the state and national governments to regulate aviation.

Airlines of New South Wales and East West Airlines were two commercial airlines operating services in regional New South Wales. Jack Renshaw's New South Wales government was seeking to manage the allocation of routes between airlines, threatening to reduce the number of routes available to Airlines of New South Wales. Airlines of New South Wales had a Commonwealth licence to operate flights between Sydney and Dubbo, but did not have a licence under newly passed state laws regulating aviation. On 23 October 1964, the airline sought an injunction from the High Court to prevent New South Wales from enforcing laws that would prevent it from servicing the Sydney to Dubbo route. On 26 October the airline increased the pressure, by operating—at a financial loss—an indirect route to Dubbo via Canberra, thus crossing a state border and therefore seeking to avoid the application of the New South Wales laws.

On 3 February 1965 the court, in Airlines of New South Wales Pty Ltd v New South Wales (No 2), found that air navigation within a state can be regulated by the Commonwealth to the extent that it provides for the safety of, or prevention of physical interference with, interstate or foreign air navigation. While Airlines of New South Wales won the case, as late as 1984 Airlines of New South Wales (by then trading as Air New South Wales) was continuing to share the New South Wales regional market with East West Airlines, with each having a monopoly over certain intrastate air passenger markets.

== Fleet ==
- de Havilland Dragon
- de Havilland DH.114 Heron
- Douglas DC-3 (including Wright Cyclone powered & engined Douglas C-47 Dakota + DC-3 Viewmaster conversion aircraft)
- Douglas C-54 Skymaster
- Convair 440
- Short S.25 Sandringham & Ansett AFBS Conversion Sunderland Flying Boats (managed and operated for Ansett Flying Boat Services)
- Fokker F27 Friendship
- Fokker F28 Fellowship (only jet aircraft type operated by the airline)
- Fokker 50

== Destinations ==
- Adelaide
- Albury
- Ballina
- Bathurst
- Bourke
- Broken Hill
- Canberra
- Casino
- Cobar
- Coffs Harbour
- Coolangatta
- Cooma
- Coonabarabran
- Coonamble
- Corryong
- Deniliquin
- Dubbo
- Griffith
- Hay
- Kempsey
- Lightning Ridge
- Lord Howe Island
- Melbourne
- Merimbula
- Moree
- Moruya
- Mudgee
- Narrabri
- Narrandera
- Nyngan
- Parkes
- Sydney
- Toowoomba (Oakey)
- Wagga Wagga
- Wilcannia

In 1963, the airline commenced services to Bathurst, New South Wales, and was the city airport terminal's first tenant. In 1988–90 in an attempt to find new economic routes for its Fokker F.28 Fellowship Jets to operate profitably, the airline as Air NSW & then Ansett NSW, flew to additional destinations outside the State of NSW including Devonport, Tasmania, & Launceston, Tasmania; & Maroochydore (later Sunshine Coast Airport), Queensland.

== Incidents ==
- On 12 December 1960, a Douglas DC-3 crashed at sea during a pilot training flight, with the loss of three lives.
- On 1 April 1965, a Douglas C-47 on a scheduled passenger flight crashed. The plane was written off, but there were no fatalities.
- There was also an incident in 1986 involving an F27. Passengers on a Sydney-bound flight from Dubbo were prepared for an emergency landing as Dubbo staff had found a nose wheel component on the runway. Passengers prepared for an emergency landing and were instructed to brace as it was thought the nose wheel would fail. The plane landed safely and was then inspected by engineering on the apron at Sydney airport.

== See also ==
- List of defunct airlines of Australia
- Aviation in Australia

== Notes ==
=== References ===
- John Gunn, 1999. Contested skies: Trans-Australian Airlines, Australian Airlines, 1946–1992. John Gunn. ISBN 0-7022-3073-1.
