= Peter Jeffrey (RAAF officer) =

Royal Australian Air Force fighter pilot

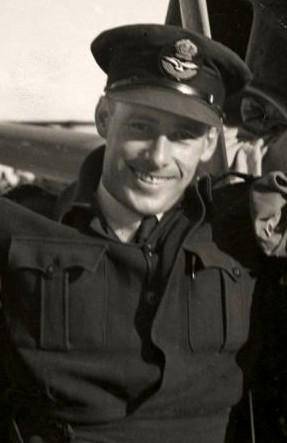
- Wing Commander Peter Jeffrey, c. 1942–43
- Born: 6 July 1913; Tenterfield, New South Wales
- Died: 6 April 1997 (aged 83); Surfers Paradise, Queensland
- Military career
- Allegiance: Australia
- Branch: Royal Australian Air Force
- Service years: 1934–56
- Rank: Group Captain
- Service number: O35436
- Units: No. 22 Squadron (1936–38); No. 234 Wing RAF (1941)
- Commands: No. 3 Squadron (1941); RAAF Bankstown (1942); No. 75 Squadron (1942); No. 76 Squadron (1942); No. 2 OTU (1942–43, 1944–46); No. 1 Wing (1943–44); RAAF Base Edinburgh (1955–56)
- Conflicts: World War II; Middle Eastern theatre; North African Campaign; Syria-Lebanon Campaign; South West Pacific theatre; New Guinea Campaign; North Western Area Campaign
- Awards: Distinguished Service Order; Distinguished Flying Cross; Mentioned in Despatches (2)
- Other work: Grazier, stockbroker

Peter Jeffrey, DSO, DFC (6 July 1913 – 6 April 1997) was a senior officer and fighter ace in the Royal Australian Air Force (RAAF). Born in Tenterfield, New South Wales, he joined the RAAF active reserve in 1934, and transferred to the RAAF proper (the Permanent Air Force – PAF) shortly before World War II. Posted to the Middle East in July 1940, Jeffrey saw action with No. 3 Squadron and took command of the unit the following year, earning the Distinguished Flying Cross for his energy and fighting skills. He was appointed wing leader of No. 234 Wing RAF in November 1941, and became an ace the same month with his fifth solo victory. The next month he was awarded the Distinguished Service Order for his achievements, which included rescuing a fellow pilot who had crash landed in the desert.

In 1942, Jeffrey was posted to the South West Pacific, where he helped organise No. 75 Squadron for the defence of Port Moresby, and No. 76 Squadron before the Battle of Milne Bay. He served two stints in charge of No. 2 Operational Training Unit in southern Australia before the end of the war, separated by command of No. 1 (Fighter) Wing in the Northern Territory and Western Australia during 1943–44, at which time he was promoted to temporary group captain. Jeffrey was transferred to the RAAF reserve after the war but returned to the PAF in 1951, holding training posts in Victoria and command of RAAF Base Edinburgh in South Australia, before resigning in 1956. Outside the military, he was a grazier and stockbroker. He died in 1997 at the age of 83.

== Early life ==
The son of A. L. Jeffrey, Peter Jeffrey was born in Tenterfield, New South Wales, on 6 July 1913. He was educated at Church of England Preparatory School in Toowoomba, Queensland, and at Cranbrook in Sydney. Having spent time as a jackaroo, by 1934 he was in his first year of engineering studies at Sydney University, residing in the university's St Andrew's College. In December that year, he enlisted as an air cadet in the RAAF active reserve, known as the Citizen Air Force (CAF).

Jeffrey undertook flying instruction on the 1935 'B' (reservists) course conducted by No. 1 Squadron at RAAF Station Laverton, and was commissioned as a pilot officer in July. Serving with No. 22 (City of Sydney) Squadron from July 1936, he transferred from the CAF to the Permanent Air Force (PAF) on a short-service commission in May 1938. He was then assigned to No. 1 Flying Training School at RAAF Point Cook, Victoria, as an instructor. In January 1939, he was posted to Britain to attend the Specialists Signals Course at Royal Air Force College Cranwell, and was promoted to flight lieutenant in September.

== World War II ==
Completing his course at Cranwell in November 1939, Jeffrey returned to Australia the following January as Signals Officer with No. 3 (Army Cooperation) Squadron at RAAF Station Richmond, New South Wales. He resumed flying duties in June 1940, and posted out to the Middle East as a flight commander with No. 3 Squadron on 15 July.

=== Middle East ===
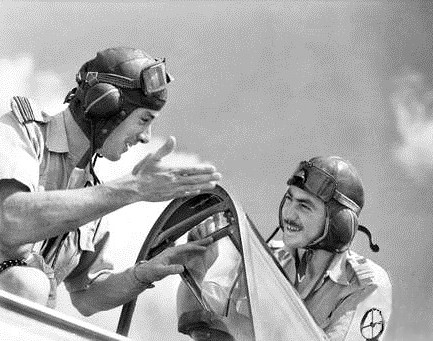
Squadron Leader Jeffrey (left) discusses the new P-40 Tomahawk with Flying Officer Peter Turnbull in Palestine, 6 June 1941.

Sailing via Bombay, India, No. 3 Squadron arrived at Suez, Egypt, in late August 1940. Along with most of his comrades, Jeffrey flew obsolescent Gloster Gladiator biplanes in support of the Australian 6th Division during the North African Campaign; he claimed no victories at this stage. Promoted squadron leader, he took over No. 3 Squadron from Wing Commander Ian McLachlan on 13 February 1941, by which time the unit had converted to Hawker Hurricane monoplane fighters. Based at RAF Benina in defence of Benghazi when Jeffrey assumed command, No. 3 Squadron retreated eastwards only hours ahead of German tanks after Rommel launched his offensive in April. The Australians were forced to use ten different airfields in as many days before the Allies regrouped.

Jeffrey was flying a Hurricane when he claimed his first aerial victory on 15 April 1941. Following a flight of four German Junkers Ju 52 transports back to their base near Fort Capuzzo, Libya, he shot one down before it landed and strafed the other three on the ground, setting all on fire. He was decorated with the Distinguished Flying Cross (DFC) for this exploit, as well as his "untiring efforts" and "high standard of efficiency ... under extremely trying conditions"; the award was promulgated in the London Gazette on 13 May. After converting to P-40 Tomahawks the same month, No. 3 Squadron took part in the Syria-Lebanon Campaign. Jeffrey scored the unit's first victory in the new fighter when he shot down in flames an Italian-operated Junkers Ju 88 over the sea near Beirut on 13 June 1941. Two days later he destroyed a Vichy French Martin 167 bomber in southern Syria. Jeffrey was credited with another Ju 88 before the squadron returned to North Africa in September to support the Allied counter-attack against the Afrika Korps. He was mentioned in despatches on 24 September 1941.

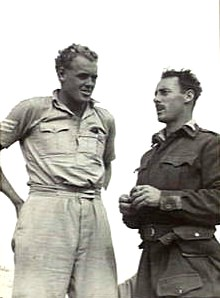
Wing Commander Jeffrey (right) with the man he rescued from behind enemy lines, Sergeant Pilot "Tiny" Cameron, on 30 November 1941.

As commanding officer of No. 3 Squadron, Jeffrey came up with innovative ways of improving morale in the face of harsh living conditions. On one occasion he arranged accommodation for his men near a beach, well away from the din of night-time bombing that was causing them to lose sleep on a regular basis. Another of his more "radical ideas" and lasting legacies was a combined mess for all pilots in the combat zone, whether commissioned or non-commissioned. The concept was initially frowned upon by Royal Air Force units, but when Air Vice Marshal "Mary" Coningham dined at the shared mess on 11 October 1941 and gave his approval, it took root across the entire Desert Air Force; leading ace Clive Caldwell later put the same idea into practice as commander of the RAAF's No. 1 (Fighter) Wing in Darwin, Northern Territory. One of No. 3 Squadron's flight sergeants recalled that Jeffrey made it a rule for new pilots to get to know their ground crew to increase their sense of comradeship, and also gave one of his senior warrant officers special responsibility for keeping track of the locations of Allied airfields and petrol supplies to ensure that the unit was never short of fuel or places to land in an emergency.

Having been promoted to temporary wing commander and appointed wing leader of No. 234 Wing RAF earlier in the month, Jeffrey was credited with a share in the destruction of a Messerschmitt Bf 110 heavy fighter on 20 November. Two days later he was shot down himself, but was uninjured and managed to make his way back to base. On 25 November, above cheering Allied soldiers besieged in Tobruk, Jeffrey led No. 3 Squadron and No. 112 Squadron RAF in an attack on Axis bombers that resulted in seven enemy aircraft being destroyed and eight damaged, against one Tomahawk lost. He scored his fifth solo victory during the engagement, shooting down a Bf 110, and damaged another. On 30 November, Jeffrey rescued one of his old comrades from No. 3 Squadron, Sergeant Pilot Allan Cameron, who had crash-landed behind enemy lines. Nicknamed "Tiny", Cameron had the bulkiest frame of any man in the unit, and after landing Jeffrey had to ditch his parachute to make room for his passenger in the Tomahawk's cockpit. He nevertheless managed to take off and return to base, and Cameron went on to survive the war and become an ace in the process. For this and other achievements Jeffrey was awarded the Distinguished Service Order on 12 December 1941. As well as his rescue of the downed pilot, the citation paid tribute to his "great success" as wing leader, his "fine fighting spirit" in returning to base after having been shot down himself, and to his "magnificent leadership, fearlessness and skill" that had "contributed in a large measure to the successes achieved". At the end of the month, Jeffrey was posted back to Australia to serve in the South West Pacific. He was credited with a total of five aerial victories in the Middle East, plus one shared and one damaged, though he was considered to be "conservative" in his scoring.

=== South West Pacific ===
Jeffrey arrived in Australia in January 1942, and the following month briefly took charge of RAAF Bankstown, New South Wales. On 4 March he became the inaugural commander of No. 75 (Fighter) Squadron, operating newly delivered P-40 Kittyhawks. Forming the squadron in Townsville, Queensland, Jeffrey was responsible for readying it for the defence of Port Moresby, which would become one of the crucial early battles in the New Guinea campaign. Although it included two other veterans of No. 3 Squadron in the Middle East, Flight Lieutenants "Old John" Jackson and Peter Turnbull, most of the unit's pilots were untried, and Jeffrey had only nine days to instil in them basic principles of combat flying, gunnery and tactics. He handed over command to Jackson on 19 March, but assisted in ferrying the Kittyhawks to Moresby two days later, only to be fired upon by nervous anti-aircraft gunners as he came in to land with Turnbull and two other pilots. All four aircraft were damaged, and Jeffrey came within inches of death as a bullet flew past his skull and into the headrest of his seat. By 24 March, No. 75 Squadron had already shot down several Japanese raiders; having overseen its successful establishment, Jeffrey returned to Australia. He immediately began working up a second new Kittyhawk unit for service in New Guinea, No. 76 (Fighter) Squadron. Based in Townsville at this stage, it was subsequently commanded by Peter Turnbull and joined No. 75 Squadron in the Battle of Milne Bay.

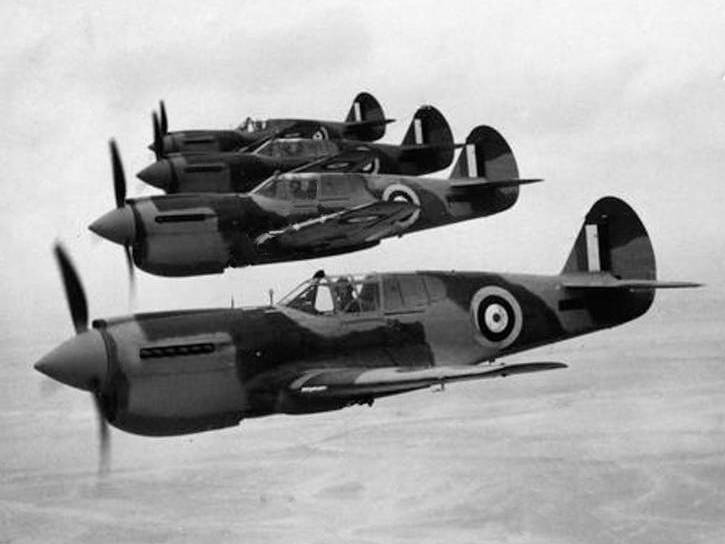
Jeffrey (front) leading a flight of P-40 Kittyhawk fighters, including one flown by Squadron Leader "Bluey" Truscott (second from rear), at No. 2 Operational Training Unit, Mildura, in June 1942.

In April 1942, Jeffrey was appointed to establish and command No. 2 Operational Training Unit (No. 2 OTU). Initially based at Port Pirie, South Australia, the unit relocated to Mildura, Victoria, the following month, training pilots for combat in such aircraft as Kittyhawks, CAC Boomerangs and Supermarine Spitfires. Its instructors under Jeffrey included aces Clive Caldwell and Wilf Arthur. Jeffrey married Colleen Crozier at Toorak Presbyterian Church in Melbourne on 14 May; his best man was fellow ace and No. 3 Squadron veteran Alan Rawlinson. The couple had two sons. In August 1943, Jeffrey took charge of No. 5 Fighter Sector Headquarters, based in Darwin, Northern Territory. On 25 September, he took over from Caldwell as Officer Commanding No. 1 (Fighter) Wing, comprising three Spitfire squadrons whose role was to defend North-Western Area (NWA) from air attack. By this time, Japanese raids had declined in strength and frequency, and Allied forces in the NWA shifted from a defensive posture to assaulting Japanese positions in the Dutch East Indies and Western New Guinea. No. 1 Wing intercepted some raiders in late September but none came in October; the last Japanese attack on northern Australia took place on 12 November. Jeffrey was promoted to temporary group captain in December.

On 8 March 1944, Jeffrey urgently dispatched two of his squadrons to the vicinity of Perth, Western Australia, in response to concerns that a Japanese naval force would raid the area, but it proved to be an abortive sortie; no attack ensued, and the squadrons were directed to return to Darwin on 20 March. He led the wing in its first offensive strafing operation on 18 April, attacking Japanese positions in the Babar Islands. The next month, he deployed his headquarters and two squadrons to Exmouth Gulf in Western Australia to protect facilities that had been established to refuel the British Eastern Fleet before Operation Transom. On 5 September 1944, Jeffrey led No. 1 Wing to the Tanimbar Islands and strafed targets in Selaru. Later he discussed the mission with Caldwell, who was then commanding No. 80 (Fighter) Wing and had tagged along to determine if such long-range operations might be worthwhile for his squadrons. Jeffrey declared that the trip was a wasted effort and he had only undertaken it to prevent, in Caldwell's words, "the morale of his pilots going completely down the drain". The following month, Jeffrey was recommended to be mentioned in despatches for "gallant and distinguished service" in North-Western Area; the award was gazetted on 9 March 1945. Departing No. 1 Wing, in November he returned to the command of No. 2 OTU, in which role he saw out the rest of the war.

== Post-war career ==
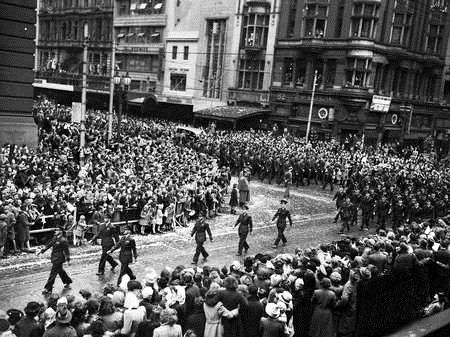
Group Captain Jeffrey (extreme left) leading the RAAF's contingent in the Victory in the Pacific Day parade through Melbourne, 24 August 1945

Following the cessation of hostilities, No. 2 OTU was reduced to the status of a care-and-maintenance unit, and Jeffrey's commission was terminated on 6 June 1946. Having been transferred to the RAAF reserve upon his demobilisation, he sought readmission to the PAF in August the same year, without success. He then took up farming, purchasing a property on the Murray River. In April 1951 he again applied to rejoin the PAF and this time was granted a commission as a wing commander. Over the next two years he held training posts in Victoria, firstly at the RAAF Staff College, Point Cook, and in 1952 at Central Flying School, East Sale. The following year he became Deputy Director of Operations at RAAF Headquarters, Melbourne.

Raised to acting group captain in February 1954, Jeffrey was appointed Superintendent, Air, with the Long-Range Weapons Establishment in Salisbury, South Australia. Coordinating weapons trials at Woomera Rocket Range, Jeffrey and his support staff were based initially at RAAF Base Mallala but later relocated to Edinburgh airfield, then part of Salisbury and owned by the Department of Supply. On 17 January 1955, he became the inaugural Officer Commanding RAAF Base Edinburgh, and oversaw the transfer of units from Mallala during the year. He handed over command of the base in April 1956, and resigned from the Air Force on 14 May. Returning to private life, Jeffrey settled in Queensland and became partner in a stock broking firm at Surfers Paradise. He later became a grazier, running a sheep- and cattle station near Emerald in Queensland's Central Highlands. In 1972 he moved back to Surfers Paradise, where he died on 6 April 1997 at the age of 83, survived by his wife and sons. His obituary in The Sydney Morning Herald on 10 April described him as the "archetypal Australian combat leader ... fearless, forthright, unpretentious, caring".
