= No. 1 Wing RAAF =

Australian Flying Corps and Royal Australian Air Force wing

- Active: 1917–1919; 1942–1945
- Country: Australia; United Kingdom
- Branch: Australian Flying Corps; Royal Australian Air Force
- Role: Training (World War I); Air defence (World War II)
- Size: Four flying squadrons (World War I); Three flying squadrons, one mobile fighter sector headquarters (World War II)
- Nickname: "Churchill Wing"
- Engagements: World War I World War II: North Western Area Campaign

Commanders
- Notable commanders: Oswald Watt (1918–1919); Allan Walters (1942–1943); Clive Caldwell (1943); Peter Jeffrey (1943–1944)

No. 1 Wing was an Australian Flying Corps (AFC) and Royal Australian Air Force (RAAF) wing active during World War I and World War II. The wing was established on 1 September 1917 as the 1st Training Wing and commanded the AFC's pilot training squadrons in England until April 1919, when it was disbanded. It was reformed on 7 October 1942 as a fighter unit comprising two Australian and one British flying squadrons equipped with Supermarine Spitfire aircraft, and a mobile fighter sector headquarters. The wing provided air defence to Darwin and several other key Allied bases in northern Australia until the end of the war, and was again disbanded in October 1945.

During its first months at Darwin, No. 1 Wing intercepted several of the air raids conducted against Northern Australia by the Imperial Japanese Army Air Force and Imperial Japanese Navy. Although the wing was hampered by mechanical problems with its Spitfires and suffered heavy losses in some engagements, it eventually downed more Japanese aircraft than it lost in combat. After the final Japanese air raid on northern Australia in November 1943, No. 1 Wing saw little combat, which led to its personnel suffering from low morale. The wing's two Australian flying squadrons were replaced with British units in July 1944, and subsequent proposals to move these squadrons to more active areas were not successful.

== World War I ==
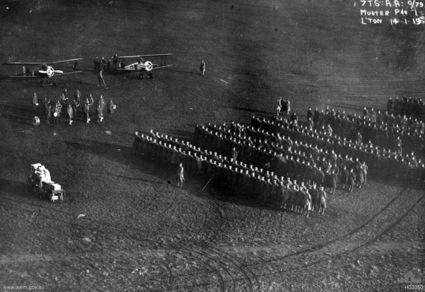
Members of the 1st Training Wing mustered at Leighterton, England to receive gifts from the Australian Comforts Fund

The 1st Training Wing was formed at Minchinhampton, England on 1 September 1917. It commanded No. 5, No. 6, No. 7 and No. 8 Squadrons of the AFC. The wing's role was to train replacement pilots for the four operational AFC squadrons in Palestine and France. Each of the training squadrons provided replacements to a specific operational squadron; No. 5 trained pilots for No.1 Squadron, No. 6 supported No. 2 Squadron, No. 7 was aligned with No. 3 Squadron and No. 8 supported No. 4 Squadron. By the time Lieutenant-Colonel Oswald Watt was appointed to command the wing in February 1918, its headquarters had moved to Tetbury. In keeping with their varied responsibilities, the 1st Training Wing's squadrons operated a wide variety of aircraft and most were split between several bases. From the spring of 1918 No. 5 and No. 6 Squadrons were stationed at Minchinhampton Airfield while No. 7 and No. 8 Squadrons were at Leighterton Airfield. Both facilities had been purpose-built for the AFC over the autumn and winter of 1917/1918. As of April 1918 the wing's units were manned by approximately 1000 personnel, making it the largest single body of Australian airmen anywhere in the world at that time. Watt proposed moving the 1st Training Wing to France, but this did not eventuate.

Following the war the 1st Training Wing continued to conduct pilot training courses in England. This activity was undertaken to strengthen the AFC and keep pilots and ground crew occupied until they were repatriated to Australia. Most of the wing's personnel were given leave in April 1919 and several of its pilots took part in a fly-past over London on Anzac Day. The four training squadrons were disbanded on 6 May 1919, the day the wing left Minchinhampton to begin the journey back to Australia. The last entry in the 1st Training Wing's war diary had been made in April that year. Watt placed a strong emphasis on safety, but the 1st Training Wing's trainee pilots inevitably suffered flying accidents, resulting in at least 17 fatalities between 1917 and 1919. At least 15 other members of the wing died from disease or were killed in accidents on the ground.

In 1919 the AFC was disbanded and succeeded by the Australian Air Corps, which was in turn replaced with an independent Australian Air Force on 31 March 1921 (the "Royal" prefix was added in August). The first proposal for the RAAF's force structure considered by the Australian Air Board included two fighter wings, designated No. 1 Wing and No. 2 Wing, each comprising two fighter squadrons. In July 1920 the Air Council, which oversaw the Air Board, approved the establishment of a base at Laverton, Victoria, to house No. 1 Wing and its component squadrons (No. 1 and No. 2 Squadrons) as well as No. 1 Aircraft Depot. No. 1 and No. 2 Squadrons were formed in January 1922, but in July that year No. 2 Squadron was disbanded and No. 1 Squadron reduced to a cadre. The RAAF's proposed force structure was subsequently amended in 1924 so as not to include any fighter squadrons or wing headquarters.

== World War II ==
=== Reestablishment ===
On 20 September 1939 the Australian War Cabinet approved the formation of a RAAF Expeditionary Force for overseas service which would have included a wing designated No. 1 Fighter Wing as well as two wings of bombers. Under the approved structure for the Expeditionary Force, No. 1 Fighter Wing was to command No.7 and No. 15 Squadrons. This plan proved short-lived as on 20 October the Government announced that the formation of the Expeditionary Force would not proceed, with the Empire Air Training Scheme instead being the RAAF's main contribution to overseas campaigns.

At the outbreak of the Pacific War in December 1941 the RAAF did not possess any modern fighters in or near Australia. Following the Bombing of Darwin on 19 February 1942, which caused heavy damage to the military installations at the town and ships in its harbour, the Australian Government began to urgently look for fighter aircraft. As the Australian aviation industry was not capable of producing fighter aircraft at the time, the government sought assistance from Britain and the United States. Britain was initially unable to allocate fighters to Australia due to its heavy commitments in the North African Campaign and elsewhere. The US Government responded by providing the RAAF with what became a steady flow of P-40 Kittyhawk aircraft.

Japanese air units attacked the Darwin area multiple times during 1942. The P-40 equipped United States Army Air Forces' (USAAF) 49th Fighter Group was deployed to Darwin following the 19 February raid, and its first squadron became operational there in mid-March. The group's three squadrons were ready for operations in late April, and subsequently intercepted all Japanese daylight raids on the area. The 49th Fighter Group began to withdraw from Darwin in August 1942 and was replaced by two Australian P-40 squadrons; No. 77 Squadron arrived in August and No. 76 Squadron in October. During its time at Darwin the 49th Fighter Group shot down 79 Japanese aircraft and lost 21 P-40s. As well as bombing targets near Darwin, Japanese air units also occasionally struck other small Australian towns, attacked shipping sailing off the north coast and flew reconnaissance sorties over Allied bases.

In May 1942 the Australian Minister for External Affairs H.V. "Doc" Evatt travelled to the United States and Britain to seek additional aircraft for the RAAF. Evatt first visited the United States, where the government agreed to increase the number of aircraft it would provide to Australia. He then travelled to London and met with Prime Minister Winston Churchill. In this meeting, Evatt requested that Britain provide an aircraft carrier to serve with the Royal Australian Navy, and an allocation of Spitfire fighters for the RAAF. Evatt had not received advice from the RAAF on the Spitfire's suitability for Australian conditions, and appears to have assumed that it would perform as well in Australia as it had in Europe. While Britain could not spare an aircraft carrier, after several days of discussions Churchill agreed on 28 May to send three fully equipped Spitfire squadrons to Australia. The squadrons selected were No. 452 Squadron RAAF, No. 457 Squadron RAAF and No. 54 Squadron RAF, all of which had seen combat over Europe against the Luftwaffe. Under the agreement each squadron would be initially equipped with 16 Spitfires and a further 15 aircraft would be sent to Australia each month as replacements. Churchill's role in sending Spitfire units to Australia led to No. 1 Wing often being referred to as the "Churchill Wing".

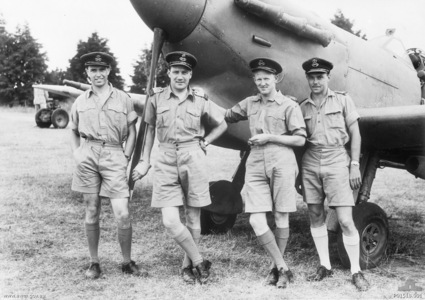
Four No. 54 Squadron RAF pilots standing in front of a Spitfire at Richmond

Delays in shipping Spitfires to Australia disrupted No. 1 Wing's formation. In late June 1942 the British Government diverted all but six of the initial 48 aircraft to Egypt to reinforce the three RAF Spitfire squadrons there after the German victory in the Battle of Gazala; most of these aircraft were allocated to No. 92 Squadron RAF with the remainder forming a reserve to replace future losses. The Australian Government protested against this action, but reluctantly accepted it after Churchill refused to counteract the diversion. During the same period, the men of the three Spitfire squadrons sailed from Liverpool on board the MV Stirling Castle on 21 June and disembarked at Melbourne with the six remaining Spitfires on 13 August. A shipment of 43 Spitfires left England on 4 August and arrived in Australia in late October, and further deliveries continued to be made until June 1945.

The deployment of Spitfires to Australia was kept secret so that the Japanese were not alerted to their presence, and the Australian Government directed that the aircraft be referred to as Capstans (after the brand of cigarettes) and their Merlin engines as Marvels. General Douglas MacArthur, the commander of Allied forces in the South West Pacific Area, agreed that the Australian Government could choose when to announce the presence of the Spitfires, but warned against exaggerating the impact they were likely to have.

No. 1 Wing was formed at RAAF Station Richmond on 7 October 1942. Its initial commander was Group Captain Allan Walters and the wing leader was Wing Commander Clive Caldwell, Australia's top-scoring flying ace of the war. At this time the RAAF had received 71 tropicalised variants of the Spitfire Vc and another 33 were en route to Australia. These aircraft differed from the standard Spitfire Vc in that they were optimised for use in desert and tropical areas and had been fitted with a Vokes air filter beneath their nose to reduce the amount of sand and dust which entered the engine; Caldwell believed that this modification reduced the Spitfires' performance. As well as the three Spitfire squadrons, No. 1 Wing also included No. 10 Mobile Fighter Sector Headquarters. Many of the squadrons' most experienced pilots were posted to other units before they departed Britain, and only 37 of the 95 pilots in the wing as at May 1943 had previously seen combat.

Following its formation the wing undertook training in the Richmond area until late December 1942. Its performance during these exercises was hindered by a lack of previous contact between the Australian and British pilots which was exacerbated by the three squadrons being based at different airstrips in the Sydney region. Several accidents occurred, resulting in the deaths of four pilots. Richmond's base commander, Group Captain Paddy Heffernan, found that the veterans of the European theatre of operations "tended to consider themselves invincible", and reacted with disdain when he warned them that the Japanese A6M Zero could outmanoeuvre the Spitfire. On 29 December the wing held a formal dinner at RAAF Station Richmond which was attended by H.V. Evatt, Minister for Air Arthur Drakeford, Chief of the Air Staff Air Vice Marshal George Jones, and Group Captain Heffernan.

=== Early engagements ===
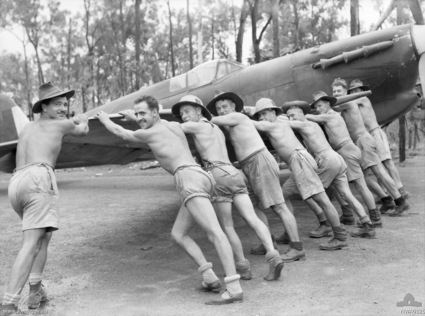
No. 457 Squadron ground crew push a Spitfire into its dispersal bay at Livingstone Airfield during February 1943

The wing was ready for combat operations at the end of 1942 and was assigned responsibility for defending Darwin against Japanese air attacks. The bulk of the units departed Richmond in air, land and sea parties during January 1943, following an advance party that had set out on 31 December. No. 54 and No. 452 Squadrons' air parties arrived at RAAF Station Darwin and Batchelor Airfield respectively on 17 January, and No. 457 Squadron began to operate from Livingstone Airfield on 31 January. No. 452 Squadron subsequently moved to Strauss Airfield on 1 February. The Darwin area had been attacked 50 times by the time No. 1 Wing arrived. Conditions at Strauss and Livingstone were primitive, with these airfields comprising narrow dirt runways and tree-lined taxiways. The pilots were not familiar with operating from such under-developed airfields, and the squadrons at Strauss and Livingstone suffered a high accident rate during February and March 1943. The airmen also found the region's hot and humid climate to be oppressive. This was the first time that Spitfires had operated in a tropical environment, and the aircraft were found to have lesser performance than in other climatic conditions. The region's remoteness also contributed to supply difficulties, and No. 1 Wing continually suffered from a shortage of spare parts for its Spitfires. Despite these limitations to Spitfire operations, the wing's arrival improved the morale of Allied military units near Darwin and allowed No. 77 Squadron to be transferred from Darwin to Milne Bay in New Guinea. No. 1 Wing first saw combat on 6 February 1943 when a No. 54 Squadron Spitfire shot down a Mitsubishi Ki-46 "Dinah" reconnaissance aircraft near Darwin. Another Dinah overflew Darwin the next day but was not intercepted, and no further Japanese aircraft ventured into the area during the month.

No. 1 Wing engaged in its first large-scale battles during March 1943. On 2 March, No. 54 and No. 457 Squadrons intercepted 16 Japanese aircraft, which had attacked Coomalie Creek Airfield. Four of the raiders were shot down, two of them by Wing Commander Caldwell. This engagement led Prime Minister John Curtin to announce on 4 March that Spitfires were operational in Australia. His statement in the House of Representatives was greeted with cheers from the members of parliament present and No. 1 Wing received positive media coverage. Winston Churchill also took an interest in the wing's operations and sent a cable expressing satisfaction with its combat debut. On 7 March four No. 457 Squadron aircraft intercepted and shot down a Dinah about 15 miles (24 km) from Darwin. The entire wing intercepted a force of over 40 Japanese bombers and fighters that attacked Darwin on 15 March, shooting down eight raiders but losing four Spitfires and three pilots. No. 452 Squadron's commander, Squadron Leader R.E. Thorold-Smith, was one of those killed. Thorold-Smith was leading the wing at the time, and its attacks were uncoordinated for the remainder of the engagement as none of the other pilots assumed his responsibilities. Nine military personnel and five civilians were also wounded by approximately 100 bombs dropped on Darwin during the raid. The Spitfires used dogfighting tactics during the battle, causing some to run dangerously low on fuel; the USAAF units previously based at Darwin had discovered that these tactics were not effective against the highly maneuverable Japanese fighters. No. 1 Wing did not see action again during March and April, and its flying was limited to training exercises which usually lasted for less than an hour.

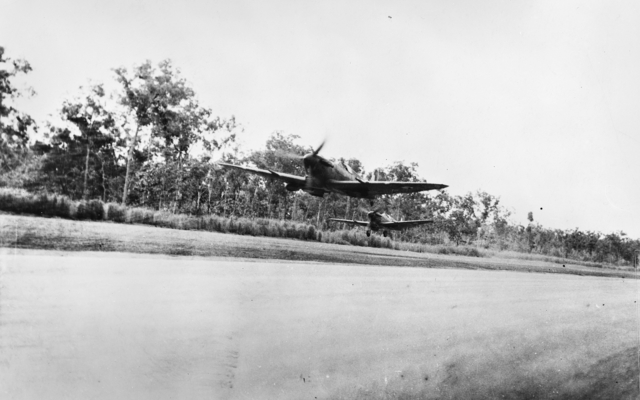
Two Spitfires taking off from Darwin on 24 March 1943

The wing's next battle on 2 May 1943 led to controversy. On that day, 33 Spitfires intercepted a force of 27 Japanese fighters and 25 bombers after they attacked Darwin. No. 54 Squadron engaged the fighters while the other squadrons attacked the bombers. In the 25-minute engagement, the wing shot down between six and ten Japanese aircraft for the loss of five Spitfires. Five more Spitfires also made forced landings due to fuel shortages and three broke off after suffering engine failures; all but two of these aircraft were later repaired. Following the raid, General MacArthur's General Headquarters stated in its regular communique that the Allied losses at Darwin had been "heavy", a term it had not previously applied to fighting in the North Western Area. This led to criticism of No. 1 Wing in the Australian media and the Advisory War Council requested that Air Vice Marshal Jones provide it with a report explaining the losses caused by mechanical problems and fuel shortage. In his report, Jones stated that the wing's equipment was in good condition and attributed its losses to tactical errors made by Caldwell, adverse weather conditions and the pilots' inexperience with their aircraft. Caldwell rejected this criticism of his leadership, and argued after the war that Jones had not properly investigated the engagement. To avoid further losses from fuel shortages the Spitfires were fitted with drop tanks and banned from dogfighting.

The raid of 2 May marked the start of an upsurge in Japanese aerial activity over northern Australia. A detachment of six No. 457 Squadron aircraft was deployed to Milingimbi Island on 9 May after the airfield there was attacked. This detachment intercepted subsequent raids on 10 and 28 May, shooting down four Japanese for the loss of three Spitfires. On 20 June No. 1 Wing intercepted two Japanese raids on Darwin. While the raiders bombed the suburb of Winnellie and RAAF Station Darwin, the Allied fighters shot down nine bombers and five fighters and damaged another ten aircraft for the loss of two Spitfires. This was the most successful engagement fought by the RAAF over Darwin up to that time, and General MacArthur sent a congratulatory message to the defenders. The battle also received positive media coverage which restored public confidence in No. 1 Wing. The facilities which housed No. 54 Squadron's photographic and parachute sections were badly damaged during the raid, but the unit's ground crew did not suffer any casualties. Several days after the engagement Group Captain Walters was posted to take command of No. 5 Service Flying Training School and Caldwell was appointed the wing's acting commanding officer. On 22 June No. 1 Wing was scrambled to intercept two large forces of incoming aircraft, but was subsequently directed by ground control to not engage them after it was determined that the Japanese force was made up only of fighters.

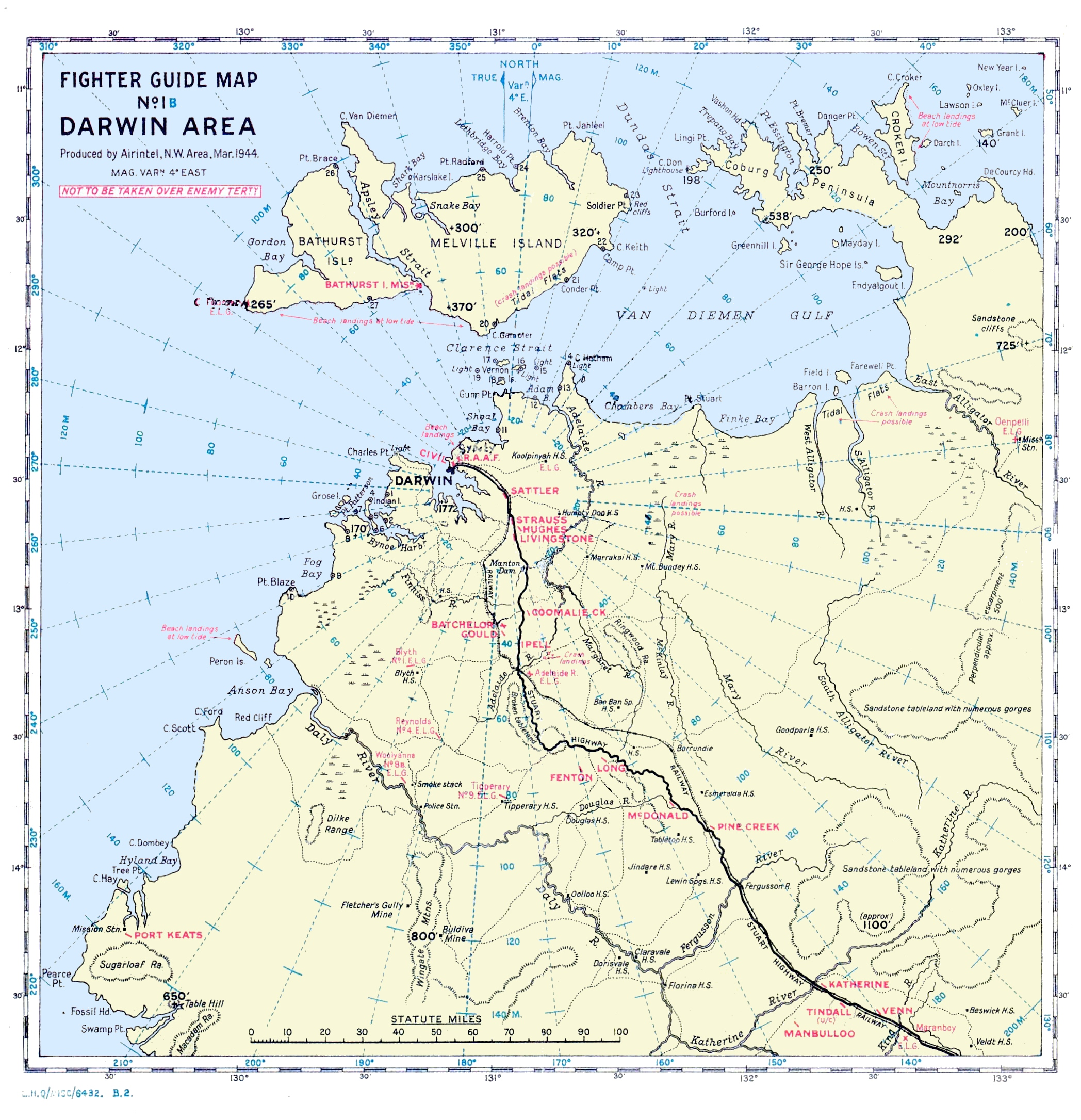
A map of the Darwin area showing the location of air fields and key geographic features as at March 1944.

Air combat continued over Darwin in late June. The wing intercepted a further raid on the town on 28 June when 42 Spitfires were scrambled to intercept nine bombers escorted by nine fighters. In the subsequent engagement four Japanese fighters and two bombers were shot down; Allied losses were limited to a single Spitfire destroyed during a forced landing. Two days later, No. 1 Wing intercepted a force of 27 Mitsubishi G4M "Betty" bombers escorted by 23 Zeros which was en route to attack the USAAF heavy bomber base at Fenton airstrip and shot down six bombers and two fighters. The wing lost six Spitfires during this battle, including three to mechanical problems. Enough of the Japanese force made it through the defences to attack Fenton, and three USAAF B-24 Liberators were destroyed and seven damaged. June had been the most successful month in No. 1 Wing's history, its strength declined considerably due to losses from combat and mechanical problems. At the end of June the commander of the North Western Area, Air Commodore Frank Bladin, requested 22 Spitfires from Vice Air Marshal Jones to bring the wing up to strength. In response, RAAF Headquarters stated that it would dispatch 17 Spitfires to Darwin during the next week and was preparing an additional 33 aircraft which had recently arrived in Australia.

No. 1 Wing saw further action in July 1943. On 3 and 4 July, Dinahs flew over the Darwin area without being intercepted. These preceded a major raid against Fenton on 6 July by 26 bombers and 21 fighters. The wing scrambled 33 aircraft to meet this force, and shot down nine of the raiders, losing seven Spitfires due to air combat or mechanical problems; a B-24 was also destroyed on the ground. The wing's high losses in this engagement were partially attributed to the worn state of the Spitfires' engines, and Bladin again signalled RAAF Headquarters to seek the immediate delivery of new aircraft. These began to arrive at No. 1 Wing's bases on 10 July. The attack on 6 July was the last major raid on the Darwin area, and the Spitfires saw little action during the remainder of the month and early August with flying operations limited to exercises and false alerts. By this time, the wing had been credited with 63 confirmed 'kills' and a further 13 probably destroyed. In exchange, it had lost 44 aircraft, though only 17 were due to Japanese action. The Japanese official history produced after the war praised the effectiveness of No. 1 Wing and the radar stations around Darwin, stating that from mid-1943 they were at "the highest level in the world". Nevertheless, Air Vice Marshal Adrian Cole, who replaced Bladin on 22 July, assessed the fighter force near Darwin as not being adequate to counter an invasion, and noted that the Spitfires had been forced to break off some engagements after running low on fuel. To counter these perceived shortfalls he requested units equipped with long ranged P-38 Lightning fighters. This request was not met, as all Lightning-equipped units were committed to the fighting in New Guinea and the Solomon Islands.

=== Final engagements ===
In late July 1943, No. 1 Wing's headquarters was disbanded to make it easier to deploy the Spitfire squadrons to different areas as the need arose. Under the new command arrangements, the squadrons reported directly to the North-Western Area's headquarters for administrative purposes and No. 5 Fighter Sector Headquarters controlled all fighter operations. This change also aimed to end the confusion which existed at the time between whether the wing leader or senior ground controller in the fighter sector headquarters was responsible for directing the Spitfires during battle. No. 5 Fighter Sector Headquarters was redesignated No. 1 Wing on 25 September when Wing Commander Peter Jeffrey assumed command from Caldwell, who had been appointed No. 2 Operational Training Unit's chief flying instructor. The headquarters' role remained unchanged.

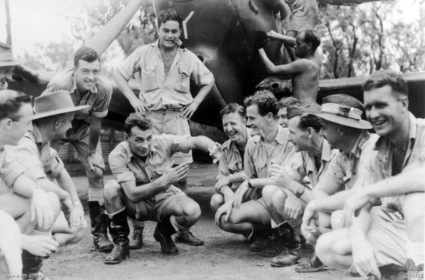
Flying Officer John Smithson demonstrating how he shot down two Japanese bombers on 12 November 1943

In the meantime, No. 1 Wing continued to respond to Japanese aerial activity over northern Australia. On the night of 13–14 August, eighteen Japanese aircraft raided Fenton and Coomalie Creek airfields. No. 57 and No. 452 Squadrons scrambled Spitfires but they were unable to intercept the raiders. At this time the remainder of the wing was holding a dinner at Darwin to celebrate the anniversary of its return to Australia. No. 1 Wing had greater success on 17 August when it shot down all four of the Dinahs dispatched to the Darwin area that day; three were destroyed by No. 457 Squadron and the fourth by Caldwell who was flying with No. 452 Squadron. This success led to celebrations within the wing and Baldin sent the pilots a message congratulating them for "100 per-cent de-lousing Fenton. Appreciate the pageant". Another night raid took place on 20/21 August, but the ten Spitfires scrambled did not make contact with the 18 raiders. From August the Japanese bomber units mainly conducted attacks on the Darwin area at night so that their aircraft were not intercepted by Spitfires.

No. 1 Wing fought its last major engagements during September and November 1943. On 7 September, the Japanese dispatched a twin-engined reconnaissance aircraft escorted by 20 fighters to the Darwin area. The 48 Spitfires scrambled in response to this force were led by Flight Lieutenant Bob Foster. This was Foster's first experience in leading the wing, and he misdeployed No. 54 and 452 squadrons' aircraft, leading to them being 'bounced' by Japanese fighters. In the subsequent combat three Spitfires were shot down while the wing claimed one fighter destroyed and two 'probables'. No. 457 Squadron was able to gain a height advantage on the Japanese and shot down four fighters without loss. A further two night raids were made against Fenton on 15 and 27 September but the Spitfires scrambled in response were unable to find the bombers on either occasion. No. 1 Wing experienced a major turnover of personnel during September as pilots completed their nine-month tours of duty. This led to a loss of experienced airmen, but the new pilots were often better trained than the men they replaced. No attacks took place during October, and the wing did not make contact with the Japanese until 6 November when a flight of six Spitfires which been deployed to Drysdale River Mission, Western Australia on the 3rd of the month failed in an attempt to intercept a reconnaissance aircraft near the settlement. In the early hours of 12 November nine Spitfires were scrambled to intercept nine Japanese aircraft which were bound for Darwin and Fenton. Two Betty bombers were shot down over Darwin Harbour by Flying Officer John Smithson and no Allied aircraft were lost. Both these aircraft were commanded by senior officers, and their deaths led to the cancellation of further Betty bomber operations in the Darwin area.

=== Garrison duty ===
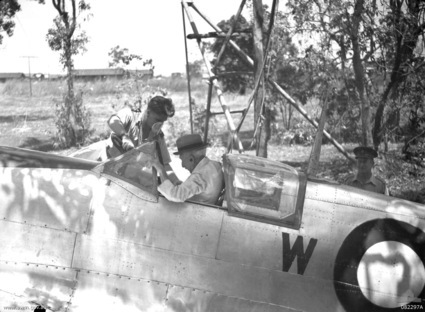
A RAF pilot explaining a Spitfire fighter's sighting mechanism to former Prime Minister Billy Hughes at Darwin in November 1944

The raid on 12 November 1943 was the last Japanese attack on northern Australia. In December the Japanese transferred several of the air units based in the islands north of Australia to New Guinea and the Solomon Islands to counter Allied offensives. Few Japanese aircraft were subsequently based within 600 miles (970 km) of Darwin, and the focus of the Allied forces in the North-Western Area shifted from defending northern Australia to attacking Japanese positions in the Netherlands East Indies (NEI) and western New Guinea. As a result, No. 1 Wing had little to do and morale declined. Spitfires were scrambled in response to several false alerts during the last months of the year, but flying was heavily curtailed by the monsoon from November. Most of the wing's veteran pilots were posted to other units at the end of 1943 and were replaced with less experienced aircrew.

On 25 February 1944 Wing Commander Dick Cresswell, who had previously commanded No. 77 Squadron, was appointed No. 1 Wing's new wing leader. Cresswell's posting to this role was made upon the request of Jeffrey, who tasked him with reducing the wing's rate of flying accidents. Cresswell achieved this through instructing pilots to make 'power on' approaches and landings and having the Spitfires' wheels modified. On 8 March, No. 1 Wing was ordered to urgently dispatch No. 452 and No. 457 Squadrons to the vicinity of Perth, Western Australia in response to concerns that a Japanese naval force would raid the area. Both squadrons arrived at RAAF Station Guildford on 12 March after a long flight in severe weather conditions during which one Spitfire crashed at Carnarvon and another made a forced landing at Gingin. On the day of their arrival the two squadrons assumed responsibility for air defence of the Perth-Fremantle area alongside the CAC Boomerang-equipped No. 85 Squadron RAAF. No attack eventuated and the Spitfire squadrons were directed to return to Darwin on 20 March. During this period the Kittyhawk-equipped No. 84 Squadron was transferred from Horn Island to Livingstone Airfield to replace the Spitfires while they were at Perth; this unit arrived at Livingstone on 12 March and departed twelve days later. On 18 April the wing made strafing attacks on Japanese positions in the Babar Islands. Later that month No. 452 Squadron converted to the more advanced Mark VIII Spitfire. In May 1944, No. 1 Wing's headquarters and No. 452 and 457 Squadrons were deployed to Exmouth Gulf in Western Australia to protect the facilities which had been established to refuel the British Eastern Fleet before Operation Transom, during which it attacked Surabaya in Java. This deployment was hampered by a shortage of transport aircraft and inadequate facilities at Exmouth Gulf and the airstrips en route to the area. Cresswell also left the wing in May to become the wing leader of No. 81 Wing. On 12 June No. 452 Squadron aircraft shot down a Dinah. Despite the limited Japanese air activity, Air Vice Marshal Cole continued to regard No. 1 Wing as being "essential" to the defence of the North Western Area and in May reported that he could not release it for other duties.

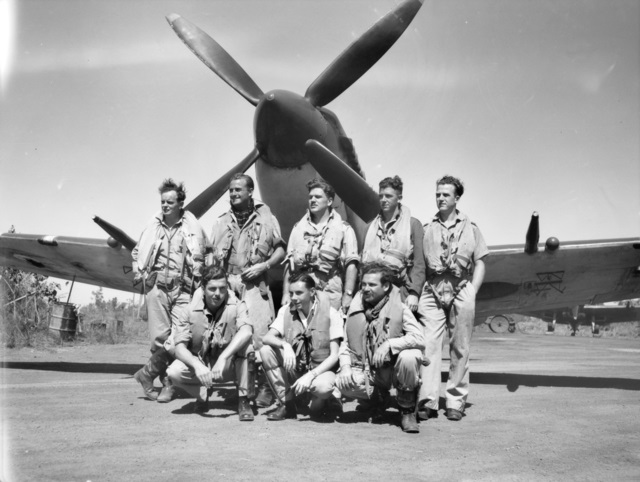
Several No. 549 Squadron pilots posing with a Spitfire in June 1945

No. 1 Wing was restructured from July 1944. On 1 July, No. 452 and No. 457 Squadrons were transferred to No. 80 Wing RAAF, which had been formed to conduct offensive operations in the NEI under the command of Clive Caldwell. They were replaced by two British units; No. 548 and No. 549 Squadrons RAF. This put the wing in a unique position: all of its flying squadrons were now British units. The new RAF squadrons had been formed in Australia, as a result of a further meeting between H.V. Evatt and Winston Churchill in July 1943, at which Evatt had requested additional RAF units. They were formed from British pilots and Australian ground crew at Lawnton, Queensland on 15 December 1943 but did not receive their Mark VIII Spitfires until April the next year. No. 548 Squadron was initially stationed at Livingstone Airfield, and its air echelon arrived there on 10 June after a flight in which four Spitfires made forced landings when they ran low on fuel. No. 549 Squadron's air echelon arrived at Strauss Airfield on 16 June and its rear echelon completed its movement from Queensland on 14 July. On 20 July, two No. 54 Squadron Spitfires operating out of Truscott Airstrip shot down a Dinah. This was the last Japanese aircraft to be destroyed over Northern Australia.

After July 1944, No. 1 Wing's combat flying was limited to occasional raids on Japanese positions. Aircraft from the wing strafed Selaroe in the Tanimbar Islands on 5 September. After the raid Jeffrey told Caldwell that it had been conducted only as a means of boosting his pilots' morale. Caldwell believed that the danger of flying Spitfires to the edge of their range in such operations outweighed the benefits which could be gained, and did not allow his pilots to participate in them. Group Captain Brian "Blackjack" Walker assumed command of No. 1 Wing in October; he had previously served at Darwin as No. 12 Squadron RAAF's commander. From 24 October the wing's three squadrons were all stationed at Darwin's civil airfield, which was located 1 mile (1.6 km) from RAAF Station Darwin. On 27 November seven Spitfires, five of which were drawn from No. 549 Squadron, escorted B-25 Mitchells to Cape Lore, Timor and strafed the area before the bombers made their attack. This was the longest operational flight made by Spitfire fighters during the war.

Boredom continued to be a major problem for No. 1 Wing, and morale declined sharply in 1945 after No. 80 Wing left Darwin for the NEI and most of the Spitfires were grounded due to cooling system problems. Frustrations caused by a lack of opportunities for air combat were a common problem across the RAAF's fighter squadrons in the SWPA, and contributed to the "Morotai Mutiny" of April 1945 when Caldwell and seven other officers attempted to resign in protest against their units being primarily tasked with attacking isolated Japanese garrisons. The Australian and British governments discussed replacing the RAF pilots with Australians or transferring the squadrons to a more active area, and in July 1945 Air Vice Marshal William Bostock, who led RAAF Command, proposed transferring two No. 1 Wing squadrons to Borneo to operate in the ground attack role. This did not eventuate and the only action undertaken by the wing during 1945 was an attack made by six Spitfires on Japanese positions at Cape Chater, Timor on 3 June. Following the end of the war, No. 1 Wing's headquarters closed at Darwin on 12 October 1945, and the three British squadrons were disbanded on 31 October.
