= Darwin Raid =

Darwin Raid may refer to various World War II Japanese air attacks against Darwin, Australia, between 19 February 1942 and 2 May 1943, most notably:

- Bombing of Darwin, the first and largest raids, on 19 February 1942
- Raid on Darwin (2 May 1943), the final raid, on 2 May 1943

For a complete list of air raids on Darwin, see Air raids on Australia, 1942–43.
