= Raid on Darwin (2 May 1943) =

Battle in the North Western Area Campaign of World War II

Coordinates: 12°27′S 130°50′E

Japanese raid on Darwin (2 May 1943)
- Part of the Pacific War
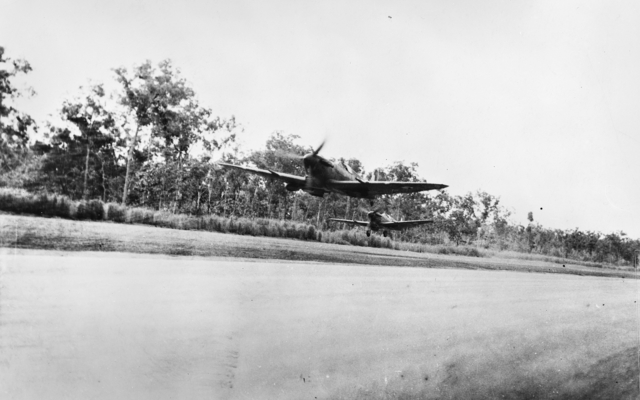
- Two Spitfires taking off from an airstrip near Darwin in March 1943
Date	2 May 1943
Location	Darwin, Northern Territory
Result	Indecisive

Belligerents
Japan	Australia; United Kingdom

Commanders and leaders
(Empire of Japan) Suzuki Minoru	(Australia) Clive Caldwell

Strength
27 Zero fighters 25 bombers	33 Spitfire fighters Darwin anti-aircraft guns

Casualties and losses
6–10 aircraft destroyed 8 aircraft damaged	2 pilots killed 1 soldier killed 14 Spitfires destroyed or damaged Minor damage to buildings

The Japanese raid on Darwin of 2 May 1943 was a significant battle in the North Western Area Campaign of World War II. During the raid a force of over 20 Japanese bombers and Zero fighters attacked the Australian town of Darwin, Northern Territory, inflicting little damage on the ground. This attack was the 54th Japanese airstrike over Australia.

The Royal Australian Air Force (RAAF) unit responsible for protecting the town, No. 1 Wing RAAF, intercepted the Japanese force after it had completed its attack, and suffered heavy losses from the Japanese fighters, aggravated by fuel shortages. The results of the battle led to public concern, and No. 1 Wing adopted new fighting tactics which proved successful in countering later raids.
