= Operation Transom =

1944 British-American air raid on Surabaya

- Part of the South-East Asian theatre of World War II
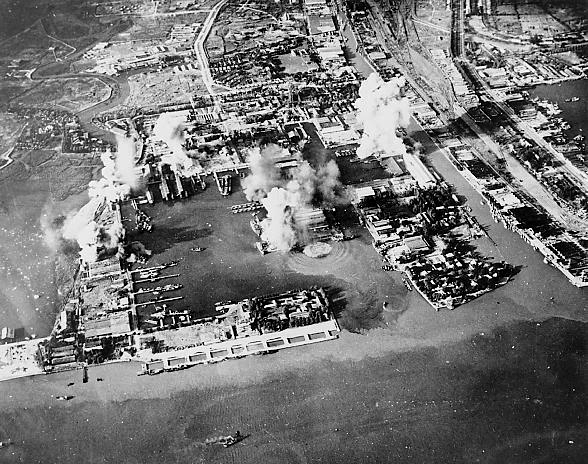
- Surabaya during the attack by Allied carrier aircraft on 17 May 1944
Date	17 May 1944
Location	Surabaya, Netherlands East Indies 7.211035°S 112.730260°E
Result	Allied victory

Belligerents
United Kingdom; United States; Australia; France; Netherlands; New Zealand	Japan

Commanders and leaders
(United Kingdom) James Somerville	Unknown

Strength
76 aircraft 2 aircraft carriers 3 battleships 1 battlecruiser 6 cruisers 14 destroyers 8 submarines	Anti-aircraft batteries

Casualties and losses
3 aircraft destroyed	Accounts differ
- Unknown civilian casualties
- Location of Surabaya in Java

Operation Transom was an attack by Allied forces against the Japanese-occupied city of Surabaya on the Indonesian island of Java during World War II. Conducted by the British-led Eastern Fleet, the operation took place on 17 May 1944 and involved American and British carrier-based aircraft bombing the city's docks and an oil refinery. An American torpedo bomber was shot down, and two British torpedo bombers were lost in accidents.

The attack on Surabaya was the second, and final, joint American-British aircraft carrier raid in the Indian Ocean during 1944. It was undertaken to divert Japanese forces from the Allied landing on Wakde island off New Guinea and make use of the American aircraft carrier on its return voyage to the Pacific. The warships involved in the operation sailed from Ceylon and refuelled in Western Australia before reaching the waters south of Java, where the carriers' aircraft were launched. On the morning of 17 May two groups of Allied aircraft made a coordinated attack on Surabaya's port and several industrial facilities that took the Japanese by surprise. American heavy bombers struck Surabaya that night and Australian aircraft laid mines in nearby waters; these aircraft operated from bases in northern Australia.

Estimates of the damage inflicted by the Allies differ. Some sources describe the results as modest, and others contend that they were significant. The number of civilian casualties caused by the raid is unknown. There is consensus that the operation provided the British Royal Navy with useful exposure to superior United States Navy carrier tactics. The attack had no effect on Japanese military deployments as the Eastern Fleet was not considered a serious threat.

== Background ==
=== Surabaya in World War II ===
Surabaya is a city in eastern Java that was part of the Netherlands East Indies (NEI) at the time of World War II. It became one of the main port cities in Asia during the late 19th century and was the centre of the NEI's sugar export industry. Surabaya's economy began to decline in the 1920s, but it remained an important commercial city.

Japanese forces invaded and conquered most of the NEI between December 1941 and March 1942. Surabaya was bombed on many occasions during the campaign, the first air raid focusing on the city's port and naval base. The Dutch garrison surrendered on 8 March. Like the rest of Java, Surabaya was administered by the Imperial Japanese Army during the occupation of the Netherlands East Indies.

Surabaya remained an important naval base and industrial centre during the occupation. Japanese anti-submarine forces based at Surabaya hunted Allied submarines operating in the Java Sea. The Wonokromo oil refinery located in the city was the only facility in Java that produced aviation fuel. Large numbers of Allied aircraft attacked Surabaya on 22 July and the night of 8/9 November 1943. Areas across the city were bombed during the first of these raids. Small raids took place during most months from February 1944 until the end of the war in August 1945. Consolidated PBY Catalina aircraft of the Royal Australian Air Force also periodically dropped naval mines in the entrance to Surabaya's port from August 1943. From the start of 1944 minefields laid by aircraft considerably disrupted movements of shipping in and out of Surabaya and sank several ships.

=== Allied and Japanese plans ===
From mid-1942 until early 1944 the Allies did not undertake any offensive naval operations in the Indian Ocean. Their main naval force there was the small British-led Eastern Fleet which was commanded by Admiral Sir James Somerville. From January 1943 the fleet did not include any aircraft carriers and its three elderly battleships were transferred elsewhere later in the year. The remaining ships were capable only of protecting Allied shipping. Fortunately for the Allies, the Japanese did not attempt any large-scale operations in the Indian Ocean after mid-1942. This allowed the Eastern Fleet to focus on countering German and Japanese submarines and using its own submarines to raid Japanese shipping.

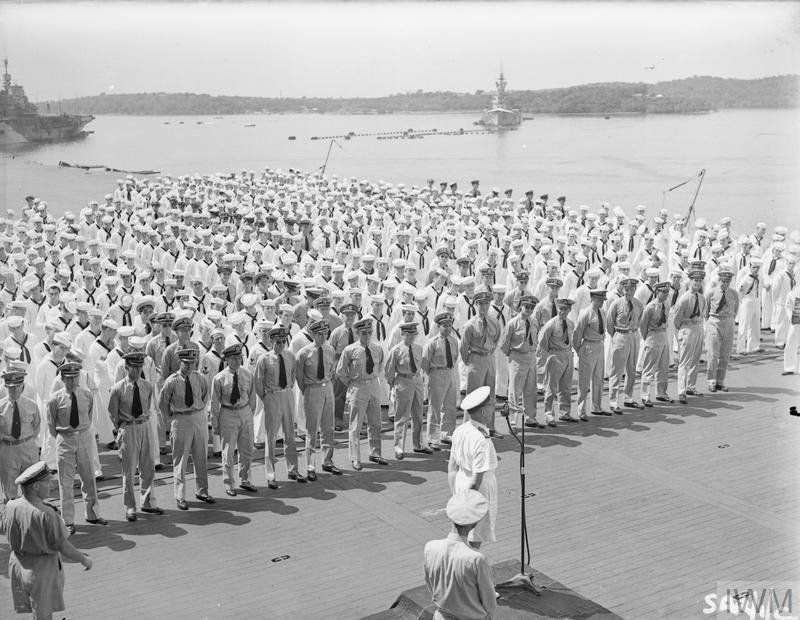
Admiral James Somerville addressing the crew of USS Saratoga on 3 April 1944

The plan adopted by the Allied leaders at the November 1943 Cairo Conference stated that "the main effort against Japan should be made in the Pacific", and that the Indian Ocean would be a subsidiary theatre. It was also decided that any offensive operations, including aircraft carrier raids, in the theatre would have the goals of "maintaining pressure on the enemy, forcing dispersion of his forces, and attaining the maximum attrition of his air and naval forces and shipping".

In January 1944 the Admiralty, the British government institution responsible for administering the Royal Navy, decided to substantially reinforce the Eastern Fleet. This had been made possible by the surrender of the Italian Navy in 1943, which removed one of the Royal Navy's main opponents and gave the Allies control over the Mediterranean Sea. A total of 146 warships were scheduled to arrive over the next four months. These included three battleships, two aircraft carriers, fourteen cruisers and large numbers of destroyers and other escort vessels. The first substantial group of reinforcements reached the Eastern Fleet's base at Ceylon on 27 January; these included the aircraft carrier HMS Illustrious, battleships HMS Queen Elizabeth and Valiant and battlecruiser HMS Renown. Many other ships arrived over the course of the year. Shortages of destroyers hindered the fleet's ability to conduct offensive operations until April, as priority was given to escorting convoys.

In early 1944 the Japanese military transferred its main naval striking force, the Combined Fleet, to Singapore. This change was made to evacuate the fleet from its bases in the central Pacific, which had become vulnerable to American attacks, and concentrate it at a location with good naval repair facilities and ready access to fuel. The Japanese did not intend to undertake any large-scale attacks into the Indian Ocean. Somerville believed that his force would be unable to counter the Combined Fleet if it entered the Indian Ocean, and more air units were dispatched to protect Ceylon. The United States Navy also agreed to temporarily transfer the aircraft carrier USS Saratoga and three destroyers from the Pacific to augment the Eastern Fleet.

Saratoga and her escorts joined the Eastern Fleet on 27 March 1944. Illustrious and Saratoga, accompanied by much of the Eastern Fleet, conducted a successful air raid against the Japanese-held island of Sabang in the NEI on 19 April as part of Operation Cockpit. The Allied aircraft sank one ship, drove another aground, damaged oil storage tanks and destroyed up to 24 Japanese aircraft on the ground. One Allied aircraft was shot down, and an attack on the fleet by three Japanese aircraft was defeated.

== Prelude ==
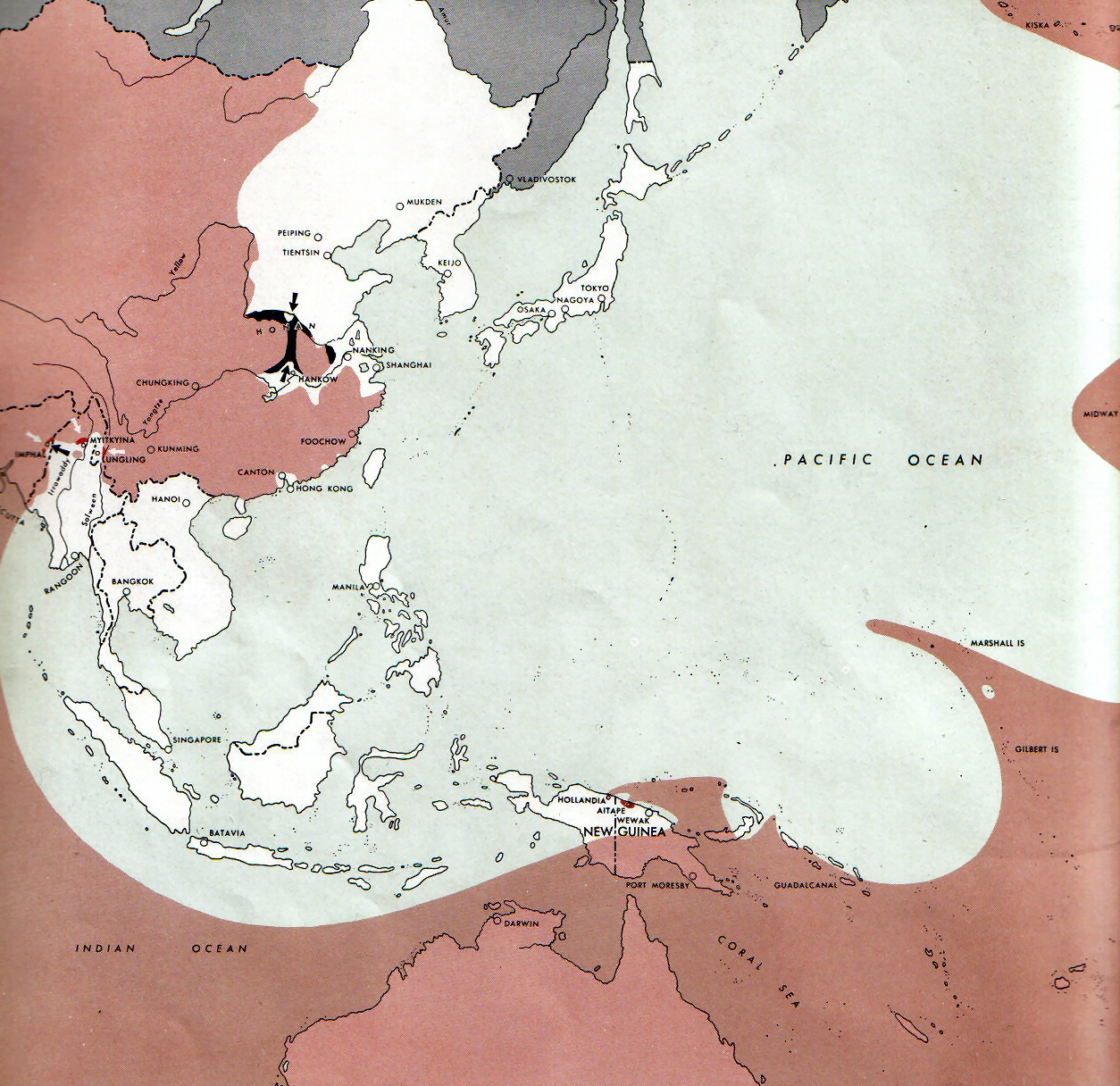
The strategic situation in the Pacific in mid-May 1944. The red shaded area was controlled by the Allies and the remainder was controlled by Japan.

Following Operation Cockpit, Saratoga was directed to return to the United States for a refit. The head of the US Navy, Admiral Ernest King, suggested to Admiral Lord Louis Mountbatten, the commander of South East Asia Command, that the carrier and other vessels of the Eastern Fleet strike Surabaya on her return voyage. King hoped that this would divert Japanese forces ahead of the Allied landing at Wakde island off New Guinea that was scheduled for 17 May. Mountbatten agreed to the proposal.

Somerville decided to conduct the attack using almost the same forces as had been involved in Operation Cockpit. One of the main differences was to substitute Grumman Avengers for Illustrious's usual air wing of Fairey Barracuda torpedo and dive bombers. This change was made because Surabaya's defences were expected to be stronger than those at Sabang, and Somerville had decided to launch the aircraft 180 miles (290 km) from the city, which was beyond the Barracudas' effective range. Because of the distance to be covered from Ceylon and the Royal Navy's lack of experience in underway replenishment, the final plans for the operation involved the Eastern Fleet refuelling at Exmouth Gulf in Western Australia before striking Surabaya. The 380th Bombardment Group of the United States Army Air Forces, based near Darwin in Australia, was to also bomb Surabaya on the night after the carrier raid to prevent the Japanese from dispatching aircraft to attack the Eastern Fleet as it withdrew. The Allies had good intelligence on the locations of Japanese facilities in Surabaya, which aided planning for air raids on the city. They lacked information on the strength of Japanese air forces in the region, which forced the Eastern Fleet to assign large numbers of fighter aircraft to escort the strike force and protect the fleet rather than attacking ground targets.

The Eastern Fleet was organised into three forces for Operation Transom. Force 65 comprised Queen Elizabeth, Valiant, Renown, the French battleship Richelieu, two cruisers and eight destroyers. Force 66 was made up of Illustrious, Saratoga, two cruisers and six destroyers. Force 67 was the replenishment group and comprised six tankers, a water distilling ship and two cruisers. Somerville commanded the fleet from Queen Elizabeth. The warships were drawn from six navies, the capital ships being accompanied by three American destroyers, four British cruisers and three destroyers, four Australian destroyers, a Dutch cruiser and destroyer and a New Zealand cruiser. The Australian light cruiser HMAS Adelaide also sailed from Fremantle in Western Australia to protect the tankers while they were at Exmouth Gulf; this allowed their two escorting cruisers to augment Force 66 during the attack. Two squadrons of Supermarine Spitfire fighters were transferred from No. 1 Wing RAAF at Darwin to Exmouth Gulf to protect the Eastern Fleet while it refuelled and Australian and American maritime patrol aircraft were assigned to operate offshore.

Each carrier had an air group made up of units from their parent navies. Illustrious embarked two squadrons equipped with 14 Vought F4U Corsair fighters each and two squadrons with nine Avengers. Saratoga's air group comprised a squadron with 26 Grumman F6F Hellcat fighters, a squadron with 24 Douglas SBD Dauntless dive bombers and a squadron operating 18 Avenger torpedo bombers, as well as a single Hellcat allocated to the Air Group Leader.

Surabaya's defences against air attack at the time of Operation Transom included a few anti-aircraft guns, whose crews were inadequately trained. Radar stations and a network of observer posts were also sited to detect minelaying aircraft. The Japanese forces stationed in the city included the Imperial Japanese Army's 28th Independent Mixed Brigade and the headquarters of the 2nd Southern Expeditionary Fleet of the Imperial Japanese Navy.

== Attack ==
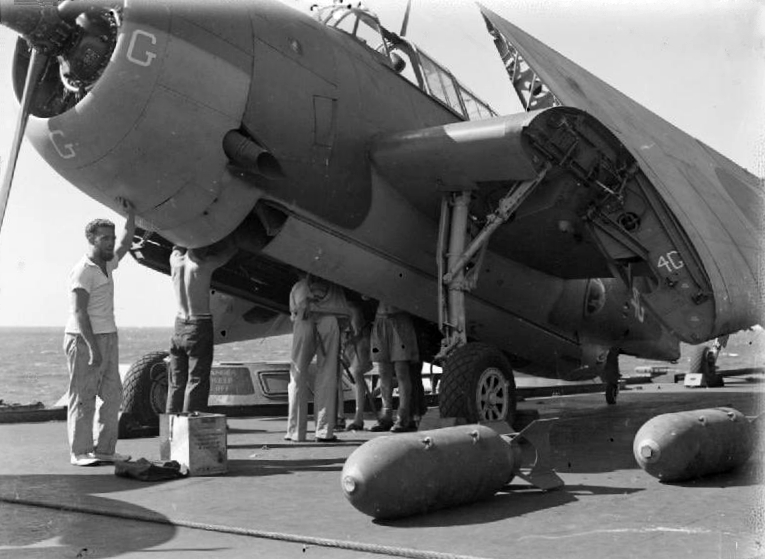
An Avenger being loaded with bombs on board HMS Illustrious before the raid on Surabaya

Force 67 was the first element of the Eastern Fleet to sail, departing on 30 April. Forces 65 and 66 sailed on 6 May. The Allied ships proceeded to Exmouth Gulf on a course that kept them at least 600 miles (970 km) from Japanese airfields to avoid being detected or attacked. The carriers' air wings practised the attack they would conduct on Surabaya three times during the voyage. The warships arrived at Exmouth Gulf on 14 and 15 May. While his ships were refuelling, Somerville met with the commander of the United States Seventh Fleet, Vice Admiral Thomas C. Kinkaid, Rear Admiral Ralph Waldo Christie who commanded the fleet's submarines, and the Naval Officer In Charge Fremantle, Commodore Cuthbert Pope, to discuss the most recent intelligence.

The Eastern Fleet departed Exmouth Gulf on the afternoon of 15 May and proceeded north. It arrived at the flying off point at 6:30 am local time on 17 May without being detected by the Japanese. One British and seven American submarines also took up positions near Surabaya, the southern entrance to the Strait of Malacca and the Bali, Lombok and Sunda Straits to support the Eastern Fleet. The submarines were positioned to rescue Allied aircrew that were forced down, attack ships that tried to escape from Surabaya and intercept any Japanese warships that attempted to attack the Allied fleet.

The aircraft launched by the carriers were organised into two strike forces. Force A was made up of nine Avengers from Illustrious, twelve Dauntless dive bombers and an escort of eight Corsairs. Force A's Avengers were to bomb the Braat Engineering Works and the Dauntlesses the oil refinery. Force B was to attack shipping and dock facilities in Surabaya's port. It comprised twenty-one Avengers and six Dauntlesses escorted by eight Corsairs and twelve Hellcats. The commander of Saratoga's air group, Commander Joseph C. Clifton, led both carriers' air wings during the attack. All of the aircraft were launched and formed up with the rest of their force by 7:20 am. Two British Avengers crashed during takeoff, their crews being rescued.

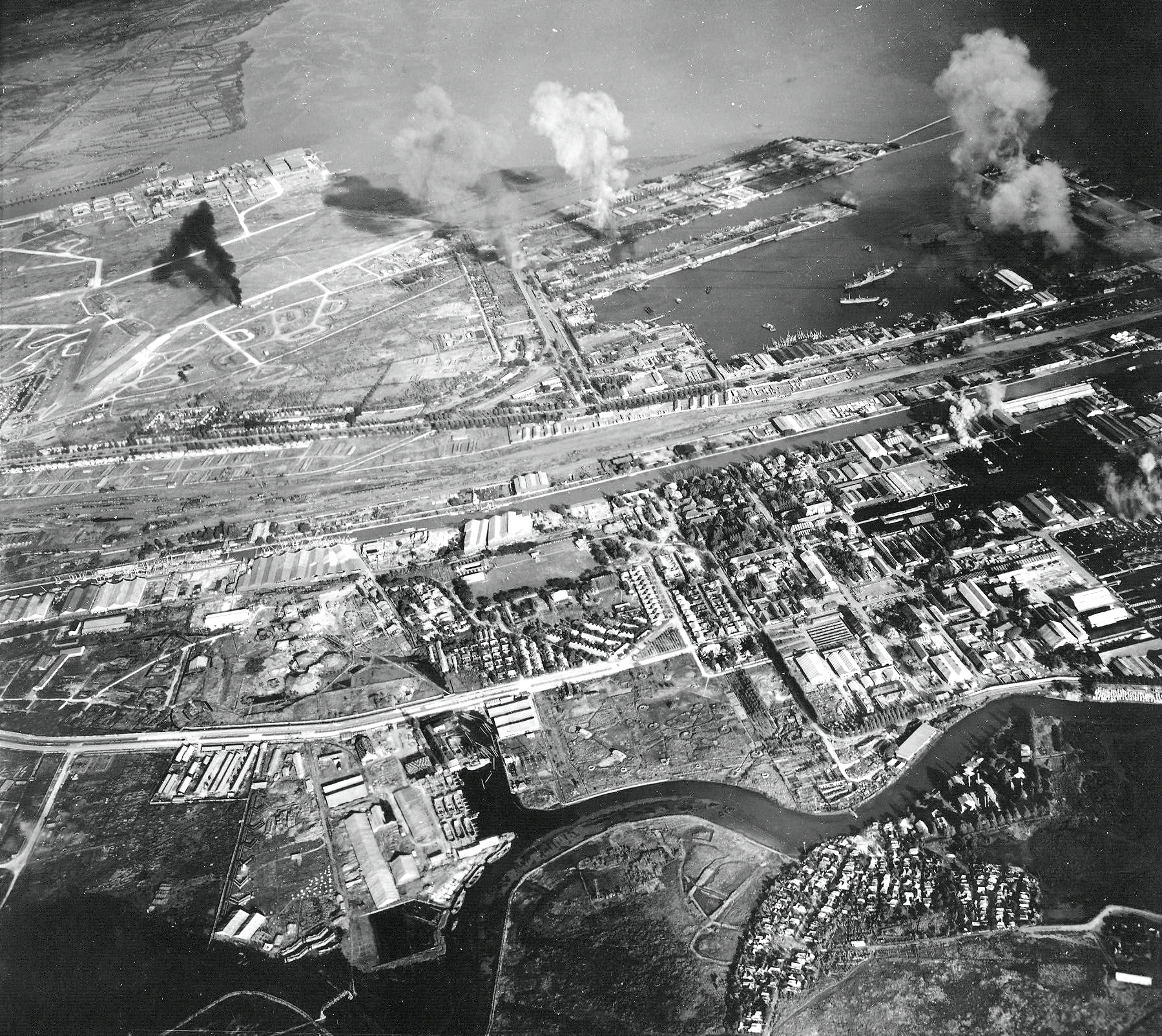
An airfield and port installations under attack during the raid

The attack on Surabaya commenced at 8:30 am. The Japanese had not detected the aircraft as they approached, and were taken by surprise. The two forces made a well-synchronised attack, Force A approaching Wonokromo from the south and Force B attacking the port from the north. No Japanese fighter aircraft were encountered, and the anti-aircraft guns were largely ineffective. One of Saratoga's Avengers was shot down, and both members of its crew became prisoners of war.

The Allied pilots believed that they had inflicted heavy damage. They claimed to have damaged ten ships, demolished both the Wonokromo oil refinery and the Braat Engineering Works and destroyed 16 aircraft and several buildings at an airfield.

After the strike force completed landing on the carriers at 10:50 am, the Eastern Fleet withdrew to the south-west in an attempt to obscure the fact that it was headed for Exmouth Gulf. Somerville's staff had not requested a debriefing from Clifton upon his return. As a result, they did not learn until photographs taken by one of Saratoga's photo reconnaissance aircraft were dropped onto Queen Elizabeth at 3:00 pm that many worthwhile targets, including Japanese submarines, remained in Surabaya's port. Somerville later regretted not ordering a second strike during the afternoon of 17 May.

The eight submarines that supported Operation Transom were not needed to rescue downed airmen, and none sank ships that were escaping from Surabaya. USS Rasher attacked a Japanese convoy near Ambon on 11 May while en route to take up station north of Surabaya, sinking one ship and damaging several others. USS Angler sank a cargo ship in Sunda Strait on 20 May but was counter-attacked by the ships escorting it. The submarine had to abort its patrol the next day after the crew became sick due to either contaminated drinking water or fumes from cleaning chemicals. The historian Clay Blair judged that the submarines would have likely achieved more if they had undertaken routine patrols or been stationed near the major Japanese naval anchorage at Tawi-Tawi.

The heavy bomber raid against Surabaya that had been planned to cover the Eastern Fleet's withdrawal took place on the night of 17/18 May. Seven Consolidated B-24 Liberators were dispatched from Darwin and refuelled at Corunna Downs Airfield in Western Australia. They then proceeded to Surabaya and attacked its port with demolition bombs. This caused further fires and damage. RAAF Catalinas flying from Yampi Sound in Western Australia also laid mines near the city during May to support the landing at Wakde. A minelaying mission conducted by Catalinas from Nos. 11 and 43 Squadrons on the night of 20/21 May encountered heavy opposition from the Japanese defenders who were still on high alert following the carrier and heavy bomber raids. One of the Australian aircraft was destroyed.

== Aftermath ==
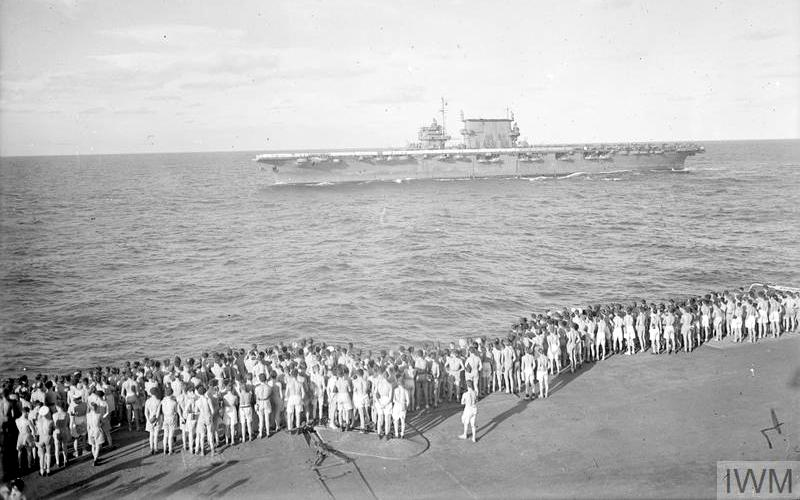
Illustrious's crew farewelling Saratoga on 18 May 1944

=== Subsequent operations ===
Saratoga and her three escorting American destroyers detached from the Eastern Fleet shortly before sunset on 18 May, and proceeded to Fremantle. The remainder of the Eastern Fleet reached Exmouth Gulf the next morning, and sailed for Ceylon before sunset after refuelling again. Adelaide and one of the Australian destroyers that had been attached to the Eastern Fleet left Exmouth Gulf bound for Fremantle after the tanker group departed on 19 May. The Eastern Fleet arrived back at Ceylon on 27 May. Saratoga reached Bremerton, Washington, on 10 June and after a refit re-joined the Pacific Fleet in September 1944.

As was also the case with Operation Cockpit and the several other carrier raids the Eastern Fleet conducted in 1944, Operation Transom did not have any effect on Japanese deployments. This was because the Combined Fleet did not regard the Eastern Fleet as a threat, and was under orders to preserve its strength to contest a major American offensive that was expected to take place in the central Pacific. The Japanese leadership incorrectly interpreted the American landing at Biak off the north coast of New Guinea on 27 May as being the main Allied effort, and the Combined Fleet dispatched a powerful force to make a counter attack on 10 June in what was designated Operation Kon. This attack was cancelled two days later when it became apparent that the Americans were about to invade the Mariana Islands in the Central Pacific, and the Combined Fleet was defeated during the Battle of the Philippine Sea fought between 19 and 20 June.

=== Assessments ===
Accounts of the damage inflicted during Operation Transom differ. Stephen Roskill, the official historian of the Royal Navy's role in World War II, wrote in 1960 that although the Allies believed during the war that "many of the ships in harbour had been sunk or damaged and ... severe destruction had been done to the oil refinery and naval base", Japanese records "do not confirm that either their shipping or the shore facilities suffered at all heavily". These records indicated that only a single small ship was sunk. Roskill judged that "fires started on shore" led the Allied aircrew to "report too optimistically on the results of the raid". The Australian naval official historian G. Hermon Gill reached an identical conclusion in 1968. He also noted that Admiral Guy Royle, the head of the Royal Australian Navy, told the Australian Advisory War Council on 23 May that Operation Transom had been of dubious value on military grounds as similar results could have been achieved by land-based aircraft without risking warships. More recently, a 1990 work by Edwyn Gray and a 2009 work by David Brown concurred with Roskill and judged that the raid had not been successful.

Other historians regard the attack as a victory for the Allies. The official historian of the overall British effort in South East Asia, Stanley Woodburn Kirby, wrote in 1962 that the Wonokromo oil refinery and other industrial facilities were set on fire, the naval dockyard and two other docks were bombed and twelve Japanese aircraft destroyed on the ground. H.P. Willmott noted in 1996 that the raid caused "severe damage" to the Wonokromo oil refinery, "damage to the dockyard" and the sinking of a minesweeper, a submarine chaser and a naval freighter. Jürgen Rohwer stated in 2005 that twelve Japanese aircraft were destroyed on the ground, a small freighter was sunk and a patrol boat damaged beyond repair. In 2011 David Hobbs judged that the operation was successful, the Wonokromo oil refinery being "burnt out", naval dock installations damaged and a merchant ship sunk. Marcus Faulkner wrote in 2012 that Operation Transom "inflicted considerable damage". As is the case for the other air raids on Surabaya during World War II, it is not known how many civilian casualties resulted from Operation Transom.

Both Roskill and Hobbs agree that the attack provided the Royal Navy with important experience of carrier strike operations and exposure to superior American carrier tactics. Roskill observed that Somerville decided to copy the way in which Saratoga's crew conducted flight operations. Hobbs identified other lessons the Royal Navy took away from the operation, including a need to plan to conduct at least two strikes against each target and the desirability of obtaining photo reconnaissance aircraft that could be flown from carriers. Gray also noted that the operation, and especially the need to refuel in Western Australia, illustrated to the Royal Navy that it required an improved ability to replenish warships while they were at sea. This contributed to the acquisition of many supply ships that later supported the British Pacific Fleet during its operations against Okinawa and Japan in 1945.
