= No. 5 Fighter Sector RAAF =

No. 5 Fighter Sector RAAF (5FS) was a Royal Australian Air Force unit formed at Sandfly Gully, Darwin, Northern Territory, on 25 February 1942. It was responsible for fighter aircraft control and coordination in the Darwin region.

5FS plotted and relayed the positions of enemy aircraft to put Allied fighters in an optimum position for interception, in cooperation with RDF and anti-aircraft defences. It was manned twenty-four hours a day.

Initially set up in tents near Sandfly Gully, south of the RAAF Darwin runway in early 1942, 5FS's position was deemed to be too exposed and the unit relocated to Berrimah, Northern Territory, near No. 119 Australian General Hospital, where an operations room had been constructed.

5FS was renamed No. 105 Fighter Sector on 24 October 1943, and again to No. 105 Fighter Control Unit (105FCU) on 7 March 1944.

The Fighter Sector complex encompassed 87 buildings by the end of World War II.

105FCU was disbanded at Darwin on 21 January 1945. It was reformed as Air Defence Headquarters (Darwin) on 21 January 1945, which disbanded on 18 April 1946.

== Commanding officers ==
- Wing Commander H.W. Miller – 25 February 1942
- Squadron Leader T. Primrose AFC – 27 April 1942
- Squadron Leader L.W. Law – 5 June 1942
- Flight Lieutenant F.H. Waters – 6 June 1942
- Squadron Leader T. Primrose AFC – 15 August 1942
- Squadron Leader C.E. Woodman – 19 May 1943
- Squadron Leader P. Jeffrey DSO, DFC – 3 September 1943
- Squadron Leader C.E. Woodman – 9 September 1943
- Squadron Leader J.D. Galvin – 14 November 1943
- Wing Commander R.H. Cox AFC – 15 June 1944
- Squadron Leader C.C. Loxton – 14 December 1944
- Group Captain B.R. Walker – 21 January 1945
- Squadron Leader B.L. Bracegirdle – 27 October 1945
- Wing Commander R.F. Wiley – 1 February 1946
