= Advisory War Council =

Australian Government body during World War II

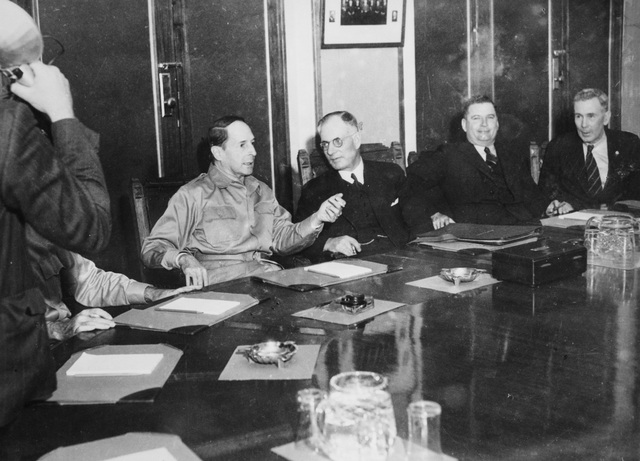
The AWC meeting with US General Douglas MacArthur on 26 March 1942. From left to right are MacArthur, Prime Minister John Curtin, the Country Party's leader Arthur Fadden and Treasurer Ben Chifley

The Advisory War Council (AWC) was an Australian Government body during World War II. The AWC was established on 28 October 1940 to draw all the major political parties in the Parliament of Australia into the process of making decisions on Australia's war effort and was disbanded on 30 August 1945.

== History ==
After the United Australia Party-Country Party coalition's narrow victory in the 1940 federal election Prime Minister Robert Menzies proposed establishing a government of national unity with the Australian Labor Party (ALP) opposition. The opposition leader John Curtin rejected this proposal but agreed to join an advisory body without executive powers. The council first met on 29 October and comprised four government Cabinet ministers, three members of the opposition and Frederick Shedden, the Secretary of the War Cabinet.

The AWC was retained after the ALP gained government in October 1941. The new government also adopted the principle that Cabinet would normally adopt any AWC recommendation supported by the majority of ministers. Labor's landslide victory in the 1943 federal election meant that the government did not need to reach compromises with the opposition, but the AWC was maintained as a courtesy. The AWC was disbanded on 30 August 1945 at the recommendation of the opposition members.

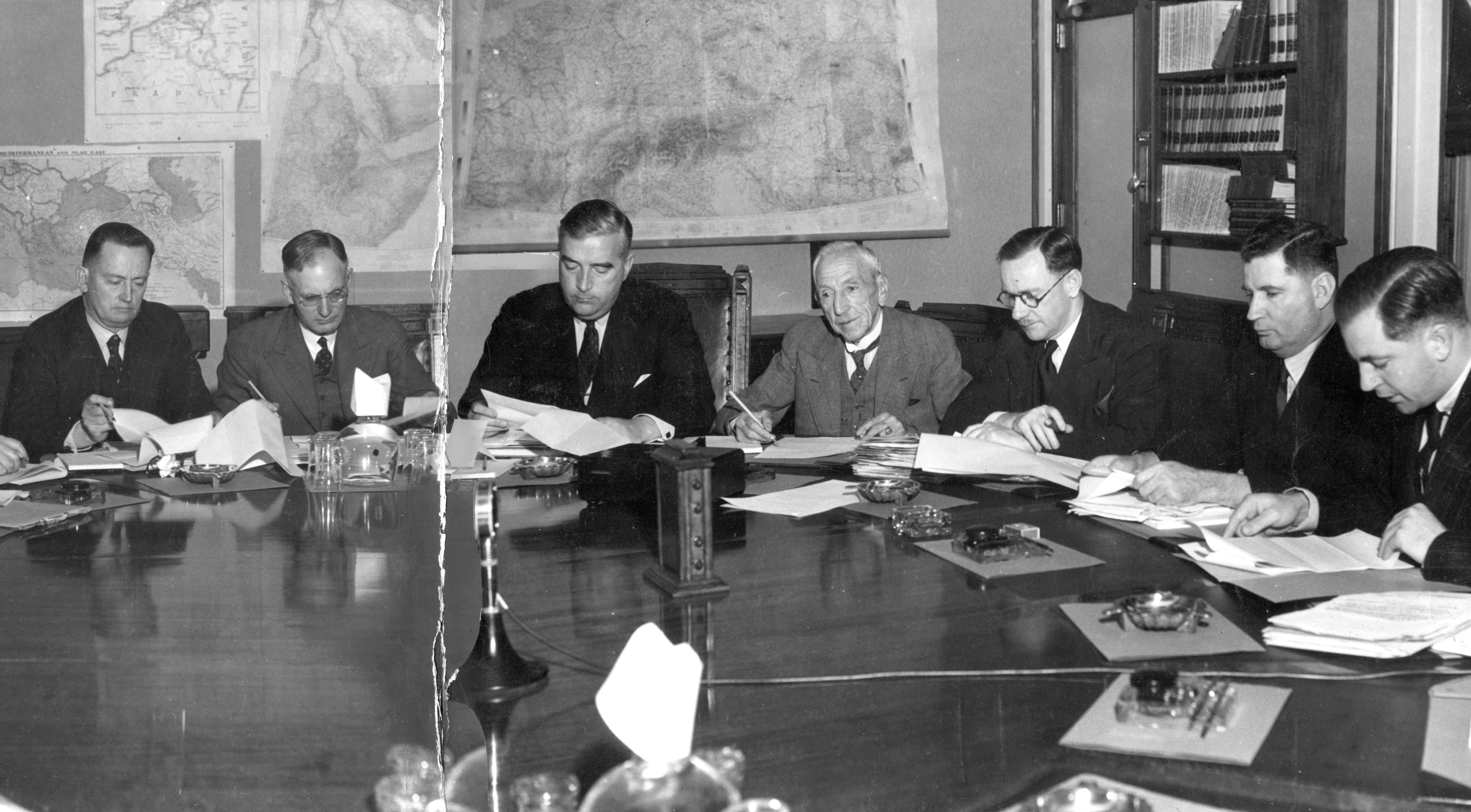
Meeting of the Advisory War Council shortly after its establishment, featuring six past, present, and future prime ministers seated together. From left to right: Frank Forde (Deputy Leader of the Opposition), John Curtin (Leader of the Opposition), Robert Menzies (Prime Minister and Minister for Defence Co-ordination), Billy Hughes (Attorney-General and Minister for the Navy), Percy Spender (Minister for the Army), Arthur Fadden (Treasurer), and Harold Holt (Minister for Labour and National Service). Spender was the only one who was never prime minister.
