= Supermarine Spitfire operational history =

Operational history for Supermarine Spitifire

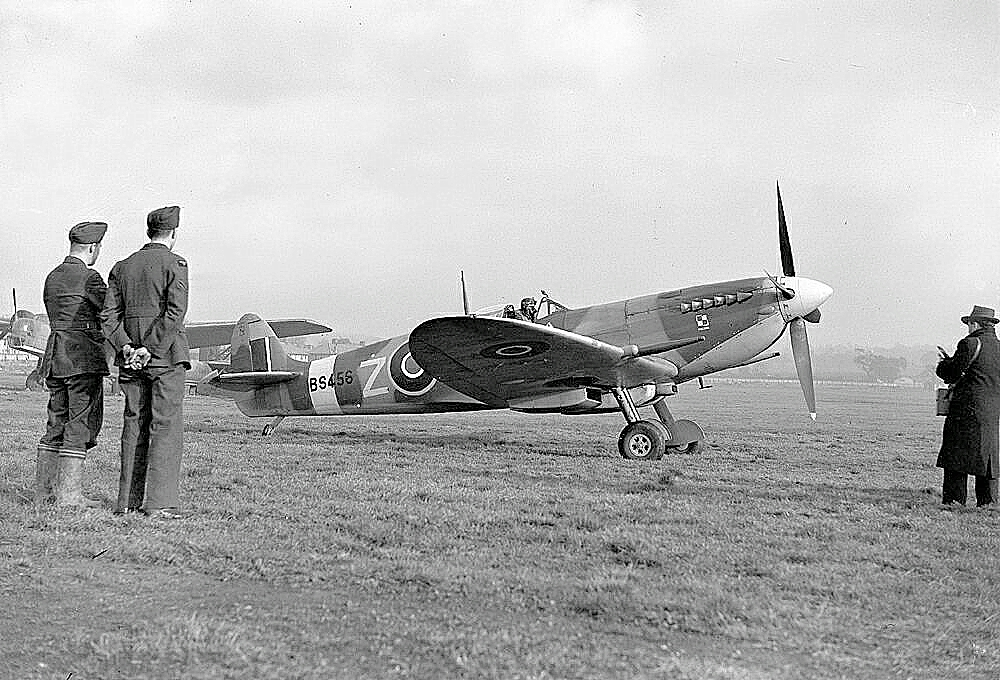
November 1942 photo of a very early Mk IXb of 306 (Polish) Toruński Squadron.

The Supermarine Spitfire, the only British fighter to be manufactured before, during and after the Second World War, was designed as a short-range fighter capable of defending Britain from bomber attack and achieved legendary status fulfilling this role during the Battle of Britain. According to fighter ace J.E. "Johnnie" Johnson it was the best conventional defensive fighter of the war.

The fighter evolved into a multi-role aircraft capable of operating in different environments. For example, the Spitfire was a pioneer in the role of the unarmed, photo reconnaissance (P.R.) aircraft that relied on high speed and high altitude to avoid detection and attack.

Post-war the Spitfire was to continue to serve as a front line fighter and in secondary roles for several air forces well into the 1950s. The last offensive sorties made by RAF Spitfires were flown by 60 Squadron Mk XVIIIs over Malaya on 1 January 1951.

== Early RAF service ==
=== Phoney War ===
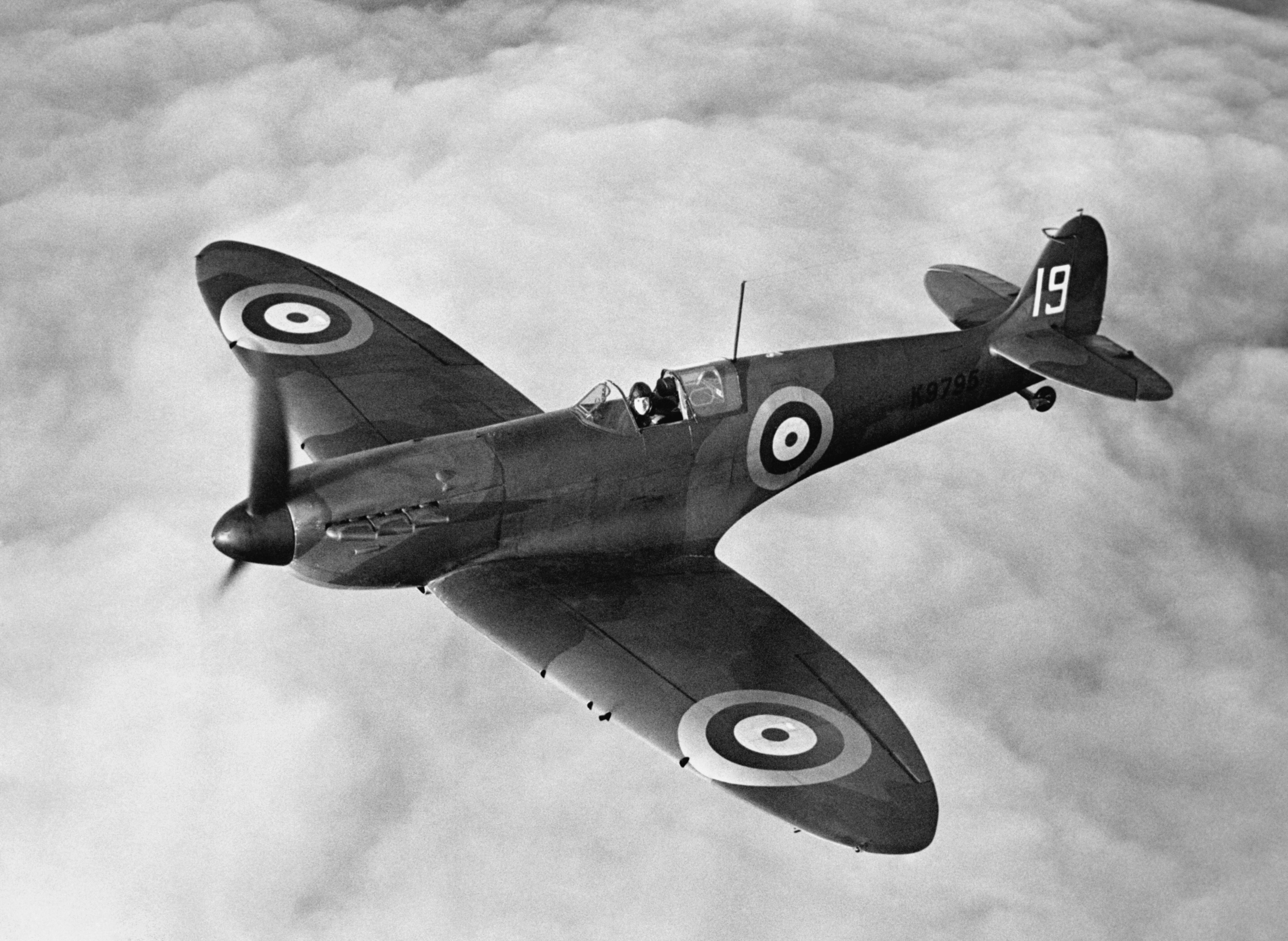
K9795, the ninth production Mk I, with 19 Squadron.

The first Spitfire I to enter service with the RAF arrived at 19 Squadron, Duxford, on 4 August 1938 and over the next few weeks aircraft were delivered at the rate of one a week to 19 and 66 Squadrons (also based at Duxford). The next to be equipped with Spitfires was 41 Squadron at Catterick, followed by a succession of squadrons stationed at Hornchurch in Essex. The public's first sight of the Spitfire in RAF colours was on Empire Air Day, on 20 May 1939, during a display at Duxford in which the pilot "belly-landed" his aircraft, having forgotten to lower his undercarriage and was fined £5 by the Air Ministry. By the outbreak of the Second World War, there were 306 Spitfires in service with the RAF, 71 in reserve and 2,000 on order; 36 had been written off in accidents.

On 6 September 1939, in a "friendly-fire" incident known as the Battle of Barking Creek, two 56 Squadron Hawker Hurricanes were shot down by Spitfires of 74 Squadron over the river Medway, in Kent. One of the Hurricane pilots, P/O Montague Leslie Hulton-Harrop, was the first British pilot fatality of the Second World War. As a consequence the development and manufacture of IFF equipment for RAF aircraft became a high priority.

On 16 October 1939, the Spitfire first saw action against the Luftwaffe when three aircraft each from 602 Squadron and 603 Squadron intercepted nine Junkers Ju 88s of 1./KG30, led by Hauptmann Helmuth Pohle, over Rosyth attempting to attack the cruisers HMS Southampton and HMS Edinburgh in the Firth of Forth. Two Ju 88s were shot down and another heavily damaged.

=== Western Europe ===
The first Spitfire operation over Western Europe took place on 13 May 1940, during the Battle of the Netherlands. German airborne forces had been pinned down in the Battle of the Hague by the Dutch Army. RAF Fighter Command sent 66 Squadron Spitfires to escort Defiants from 264 Squadron to support the Dutch. They encountered Junkers Ju 87s from IV(St)./Lehrgeschwader 1 (LG 1), and shot down four of them. They were soon intercepted by Bf 109s from 5 Staffel Jagdgeschwader 26 (JG 26) that shot down five Defiants and one Spitfire for the loss of one Bf 109.

On 23 May 1940, Spitfires of 54 Squadron were the first to shoot down Bf 109s, over Calais Marck airfield, on the coast of northern France; the first of these is usually credited to either Flying Officer Alan Deere who shot down two (according to other sources, one destroyed plus one probable), or Flg. Off. "Johnny" Allen who shot down one.

During this period 67 Spitfires were lost over France, most of them in the attempt to prevent the Luftwaffe from bombing the evacuation beaches at Dunkirk. While the Spitfires of Fighter Command continued to be based in Britain, at the insistence of Air Vice Marshal Hugh Dowding, from late 1939 there were early photo-reconnaissance Spitfires of "No 2 Camouflage Unit" operating from Seclin in France, gathering photo-intelligence of German defences and cities. (Note: Later 1 Photo Reconnaissance Unit (1 PRU)) Throughout the Second World War, photo-reconnaissance Spitfires kept up a constant flow of photographic intelligence, in a role far removed from that of short-range interceptor fighter.

== Spitfire night fighter ==
Spitfire Mark I of 602 Squadron at the gun butts having its eight .303 Brownings sighted in, early 1940.

The documentation to specification F.10/35, which was framed around the Spitfire, was headed "Requirements for Single-engine Day and Night Fighter" and stipulated that the aircraft be equipped with "night flying equipment".

In line with these requirements Spitfire Is, IIs, VAs and VBs were fitted with a powerful, retractable landing-light in each wing. Dorsal and ventral identification lights could be operated in Morse code by the pilot using a small morse key in the cockpit. In an attempt to shield the pilot's eyes from the bright exhaust flames many Spitfires were also fitted with rectangular light-alloy "blinkers" secured to light-alloy brackets fixed to the sides of the fuel-tank housing: these could be easily removed.

Spitfires were first used as night fighters during the summer of 1940: the most successful night interceptions took place on the night of 18/19 June 1940 when Flt. Lt. "Sailor" Malan of 74 Squadron shot down two Heinkel He 111s of Kampfgeschwader 4, while Flg. Off.s John Petre and George Ball of 19 Squadron each shot down one He 111 of KG 4. A week later, on the night of 26/27 June, Pilot Officers R. Smith and R. Marples of 616 Squadron shot down another He 111 of KG 4; Flt. Lt. H. MacDonald of 603 Squadron shot down an He 111 of KG 26 and another He 111 of KG 26 was shot down, possibly with the help of A.A guns by Flg. Off.s A. Johnstone of 602 Squadron and J. Haig of 603 Squadron.

Although Spitfires continued to be used on night patrols, the Luftwaffe bombers learned to fly well above the altitudes at which they could be effectively picked up by searchlights and the Spitfires were never to achieve the same success.

== Battle of Britain ==
=== Overall performance ===
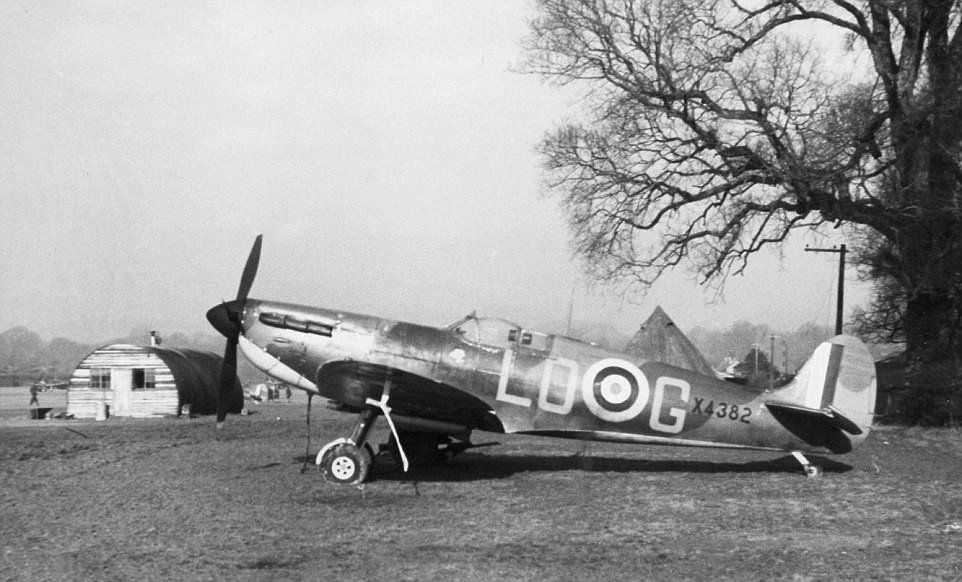
X4382, a late production Mk I of 602 Squadron flown by P/O Osgood Hanbury, Westhampnett, September 1940.

The Battle of Britain (which officially started on 10 July 1940 and ended 31 October) was the first major test of both the Spitfire and of Fighter Command. During the Luftwaffe's onslaught important lessons were learned about the Spitfire's capabilities and its drawbacks.

The combat performance of the Spitfire was frequently compared with that of the Hawker Hurricane, which was used in greater numbers during the critical stages of 1940. The Hurricane had thick wings and their structure was such that four .303-inch machine-guns were easily installed in each wing, grouped closely together, with 334 rounds per gun. Installing the guns in the Spitfire was more complicated, because it had a thinner wing and the armament and ammunition boxes had to be widely spaced. That dispersion of firepower was a weakness and at least in this respect the Hurricane – which was also a more stable gunnery platform – was better than the Spitfire. The pilots who fought over France had learned to get the armourers back at base to harmonise the Browning machine guns, so that their combined fire met their target in one concentrated burst 250 yards ahead of the wings, instead of the official 400 yards.

In total Hurricanes shot down more Luftwaffe aircraft of all types than the Spitfire, mainly due to the higher proportion of Hurricanes in the air. Seven out of every 10 German aircraft destroyed during the Battle of Britain were shot down by Hurricane pilots. Losses were also higher among the more numerous Hurricane units. Post-war analysis showed that the Spitfire's "kill ratio" was marginally better than the Hurricane's.

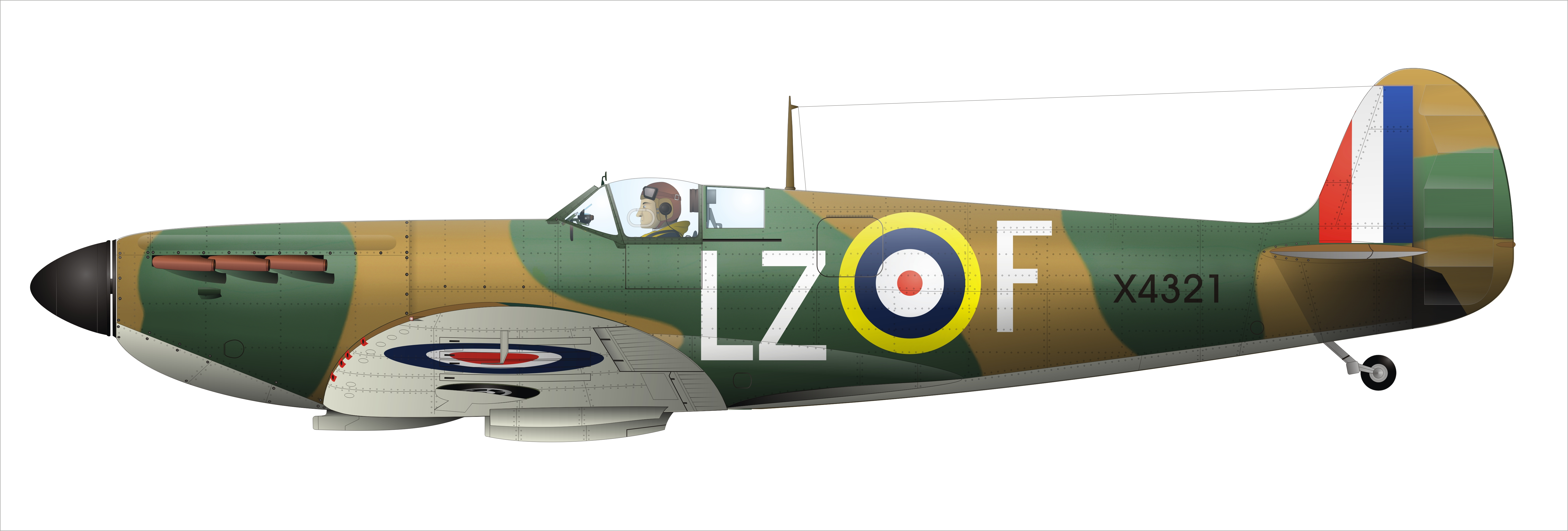
Spitfire Mk I, 66 Squadron, P/O Crelin Bodie. On 7 September 1940 "Bogle" Bodie was forced to belly-land X4321 following combat with Bf 109Es.

The majority of Mk Is and Mk IIs were armed with eight .303 Browning machine guns. Throughout the battle, Luftwaffe aircraft often returned to base with .303 bullet holes, but no critical damage as they had received armour plating in critical areas and self-sealing fuel tanks became common in bombers. Several Mark Is of 19 Squadron were fitted with two 20-mm Hispano-Suiza cannon in 1940. This early Hispano installation proved to be unreliable, with the cannon frequently firing just a few rounds or failing to fire at all. After numerous complaints from the pilots of 19 Squadron the cannon armed Spitfires were replaced by conventionally armed aircraft in September 1940. Supermarine and BSA, who manufactured the Hispano under licence, continued work on a reliable cannon installation. A number of Mk Is armed with two cannon and four .303 machine-guns entered operations by late 1940; this version was referred to as the Mk IB. The machine-gun-armed Spitfires were retrospectively called the Mk IA. (Note: Most Mk IBs were converted to the first Mark VBs which entered service in early 1941. The "B" configuration of two 20 mm cannon and four .303 machine guns was standard during the mid-war years.)

Although the Merlin III engine of Spitfire Is had a power rating of 1,030 hp (770 kW), supplies of 100 octane fuel from the United States started reaching Britain in early 1940. This meant that an "emergency boost" of +12 pounds per square inch was available for five minutes, with pilots able to call on 1,310 hp (980 kW) at 3,000 rpm at 9,000 feet (2,700 m). This boosted the maximum speed by 25 mph (40 km/h) at sea level and 34 mph (55 km/h) at 10,000 ft (3,000 m) and improved the climbing performance between sea level and full throttle height. The extra boost was not damaging as long as the limitations set forth in the pilot's notes were followed. As a precaution, however, if the pilot had resorted to emergency boost, he had to report this on landing and it had to be noted in the engine log book. The extra boost was also available for the Merlin XII fitted to the Spitfire II.

Between 1 August 1940 and 31 October, Spitfire losses amounted to 208 lost in combat, seven destroyed on the ground, and 42 in flying accidents.

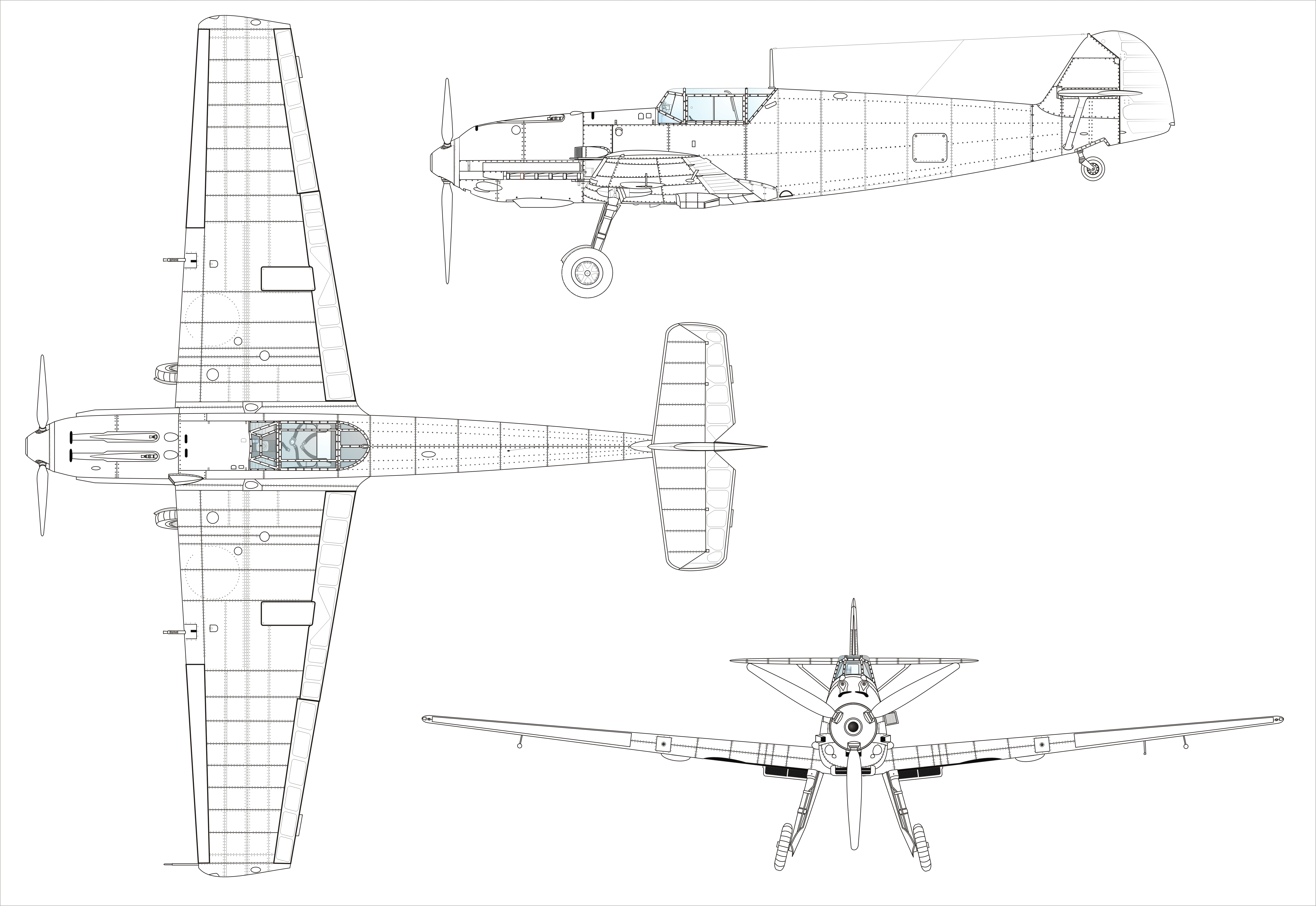
Three-view drawing of the Bf 109E-3 with the early style of cockpit canopy.

=== The Bf 109 and combat tactics ===
At the time, the Luftwaffe's main single-engine, single-seat fighter was the Messerschmitt Bf 109. Some advantages helped the Spitfires win dogfights, most notably manoeuvrability: the Spitfire had a higher rate of turn and a smaller turning circle than the Messerschmitt. There are several accounts of Bf 109 pilots being able to outturn Spitfires, mainly because inexperienced pilots did not turn as tightly as was possible through fear of getting into a high-speed stall. Overall, the aircraft were closely matched in performance and the outcome of combat was largely decided by tactics, position and the skill of the opposing pilots.

One major advantage enjoyed by the German Jagdgeschwadern was the use of better tactics. In the late 1930s Fighter Command were not expecting to be facing single-engine fighters over Britain, only bombers. With this in mind a series of "Fighting Area Tactics" were formulated, involving manoeuvres designed to concentrate a squadron's firepower to bring down bombers: with no apparent prospect of escorting fighters to worry about, RAF fighter pilots flew in tight, vee-shaped sections of three. The pilots were forced to concentrate on watching each other, rather than being free to keep a lookout for enemy aircraft. "Fighting Area Tactics" also stipulated that RAF fighter pilots were to open fire at long-range, usually 300 to 400 yards (274 to 365 m), and then break off without closing in. The usual practice was to bore-sight their guns on the ground to create a shotgun pattern at this distance.

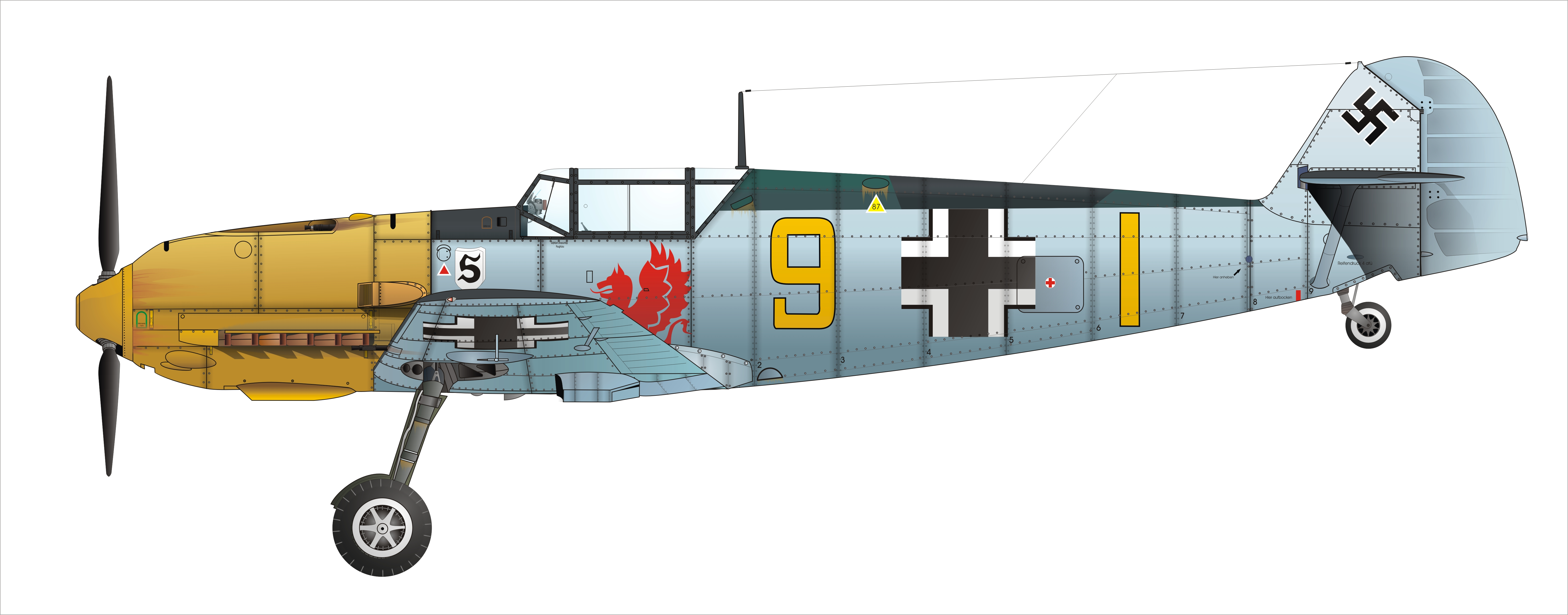
A Bf 109E-3 of III./JG 26.

Luftwaffe fighter pilots, flying combat formations perfected in the Spanish Civil War, and utilizing proved principles of the First World War, entered the Second using the basic unit of a pair (Rotte) of widely spaced fighters. They were separated by about two hundred yards. The leader was followed to starboard and to the rear by his wingman, who was trained to stay with his leader at all times. While the leader was free to search for enemy aircraft, and could cover his wingman's blind spots, his wingman was able to concentrate on searching the airspace in the leader's blind spots, behind and below. Two of these sections were usually teamed up into a flight (Schwarm), where all of the pilots could watch what was happening around them. Because the four 109s were spread out four-abreast the Schwarm was hard to spot, unlike the RAF vee formation, and all of the 109s were able to attack and defend, or retreat in pairs, whereas the RAF formations were often split up into individual aircraft which were then extremely vulnerable. The loose Schwarm, because of the reduced risk of collision between aircraft, were also able to climb faster and higher than the tightly grouped RAF fighters, which is one of the reasons why RAF formations often found themselves being "bounced" from above. When the Luftwaffe fighter units flew as a squadron (Staffel) the three Schwarme were staggered in height and wove back and forth as a means of mutual search and protection.

With the Germans able to base their 109s in the Pas de Calais, close to the English Channel the "Fighting Area Tactics" became obsolete. Many of the RAF fighter squadrons which had not been engaged in combat over Dunkirk were slow to adapt to the fact that they would be encountering the potent German fighter over Britain. Some RAF units adopted "weavers", a single aircraft which flew a pattern behind the main squadron, which still flew in vees. The weavers were usually the first to be picked off in a "bounce" by the German fighters: more often than not the rest of the squadron did not even know they were under attack. RAF squadrons that did not learn from the Luftwaffe and adopt similar tactics suffered heavy casualties during the Battle. Leaders like "Sailor" Malan were instrumental in devising better tactics for the RAF fighters. It is no coincidence that some of the most successful RAF pilots were the Polish pilots who had been trained pre-war by their air force to fly in loose formations and open fire from close-range.

The biggest disadvantage faced by Bf 109 pilots was that, without the benefit of long-range drop tanks (which were introduced in very limited numbers in the late stages of the Battle), the 109s had an endurance of just over an hour. Once over Britain the 109 pilots had to keep an eye on a red "low fuel" light on the instrument panel: once this was illuminated they were forced to turn back and head for France. With the prospect of two long over-water flights, and knowing that their range was substantially reduced when escorting bombers or in the event of combat, the Jagdflieger coined the term Kanalkrankheit or "Channel sickness".

=== The Bf 110 and the bombers ===
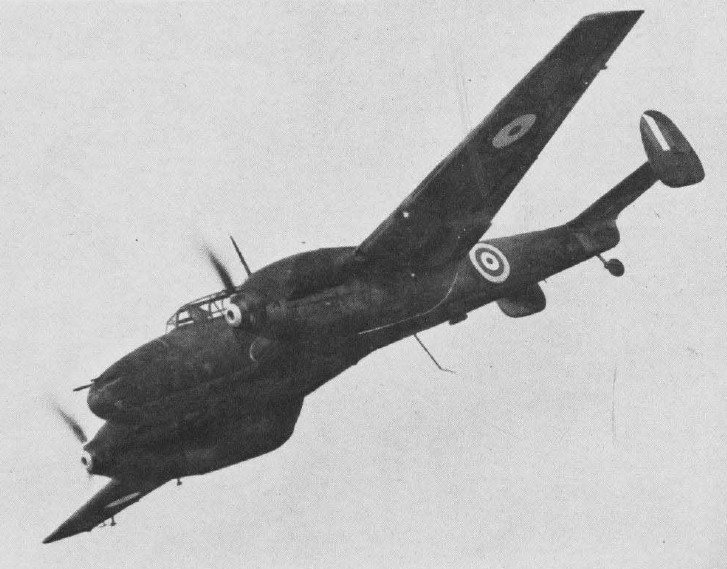
A captured Bf 110 C-4.

Another regularly encountered German fighter, the Messerschmitt Bf 110, was a larger, two-seat, twin-engined fighter which was designed as a long range "Destroyer" (Zerstörer). Although reasonably fast (Bf 110C about 340 mph (550 km/h)) and possessing a respectable combat radius as well as carrying a heavy armament of two 20 mm MG FF/M cannon and four 7.92 mm MG 17s concentrated in the forward fuselage, along with a single 7.92 mm MG 15 mounted for rear defence in the rear cockpit, the 110 was only slightly more manoeuvrable than the bombers they were meant to escort. Against modern fighters like the Spitfire and Hurricane the Zerstörergruppen (roughly "Destroyer Groups") suffered heavy casualties and, after 18 August, fewer of them were encountered over Britain because the rate of attrition was outpacing production.

Of the four types of Luftwaffe bombers, the Dornier Do 17, Heinkel He 111, Junkers Ju 87 and Junkers Ju 88, the Ju 88 was considered to be the most difficult to shoot down. As a multipurpose fighter-bomber it was relatively manoeuvrable and, especially at low altitudes with no bomb load, it was fast enough to ensure that a Spitfire caught in a tail-chase would be hard pressed to catch up.

The He 111 was nearly 100 mph slower than the Spitfire and did not present much of a challenge to catch, although the heavy armour, self-sealing fuel tanks and progressively uprated defensive armament meant that it was still a challenge to shoot down. The Do 17 was also easy to catch but, with its radial engines with no vulnerable cooling systems and self-sealing fuel tanks, it was capable of taking an amazing amount of punishment. The Ju 87 Stuka dive bomber was badly outclassed in all respects and, after taking some savage beatings, the Sturzkampfgeschwader were withdrawn from the Battle.

== European offensive 1941–1943 ==
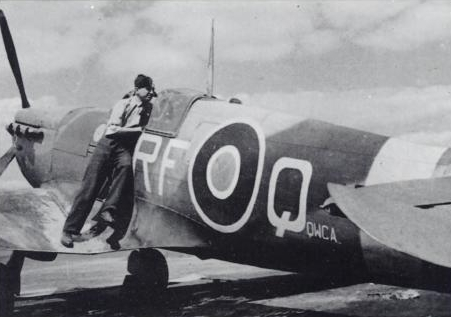
Spitfire Vb of Plt Off Antoni Głowacki of 303(Polish) Squadron based at Northolt in August 1942.

In early 1941 the 11 Group commander Air Vice-Marshal Trafford Leigh-Mallory inaugurated a policy of "leaning forward into France" With this new policy, fighter sweeps ("Rhubarbs") and bomber escort missions ("Circuses") were mounted over France and other occupied territories, with the express purpose of forcing a response from Luftwaffe fighters. Leigh Mallory was fully supported by Air Chief Marshal Sir William Sholto Douglas who had replaced Sir Hugh Dowding as Commander of Fighter Command in November 1940. As a result of Leigh-Mallory's experience in command of 12 Group during the Battle of Britain, RAF fighter squadrons were increasingly organised into "Wings" of two or more squadrons which flew together under the command of a Wing Leader).

With the change to offensive tactics the Spitfire, Hurricane and new Westland Whirlwind units found themselves facing the same disadvantages over France as the 109 units had faced over Britain. The limited combat radius of the RAF fighters meant that the Luftwaffe could engage in combat, or break off on their own terms, knowing that they were over friendly territory and with plenty of airfields at which they could land to rearm and refuel. The RAF fighters were the ones who were now having to face the prospect of two long over-water passages, returning in many cases with combat damage.

By late 1940, Luftwaffe fighter units were being re-equipped with the formidable new Bf 109F-1 and F-2, considered by many Luftwaffe pilots to be the best of the many variants of this fighter. The F-1s and F-2s easily outperformed the Spitfire Mk Is and IIs and it closely matched the Mk Vs which were just about to enter service. In the hands of pilots like Adolf Galland it was a daunting proposition to be facing this aircraft over France. On 10 July 1941, a 109 F-2 flown by Hauptmann Rolf Pingel of I./JG 26. followed a Short Stirling heavy bomber he had intercepted across the Channel. Return fire from the Stirling hit his fighter's cooling system, forcing him to "crash-land" in a field near Dover. The 109 was repaired and tested at Air Fighting Development Unit (AFDU) until it crashed, killing the pilot, on 20 October 1941. The results of these tests helped in the development of tactics to counter the new fighter.

Compared with the massive bomber raids mounted by the Luftwaffe in 1939 and 1940 the RAF Bomber Command Circus operations were very small and rarely damaging. Circuses consisted of one or at most two squadrons of Bristol Blenheims (later Short Stirlings were also used) which were usually escorted by large, conspicuous "Beehives" of five or more fighter squadrons. The primary intent was to lure the German fighters into combat rather than causing damage by bombing. The Luftwaffe, with the assistance of radar, could afford to oppose these "Circuses" with relatively small numbers of fighters, which could pick and choose whether or not to take on the escorting fighters. Douglas Bader, flying a Mk Va, (Note: Wg Cdr Bader preferred the eight .303 machine-gun armament to the two 20 mm cannon and four .303 machine guns which was the standard armament. His score while flying Spitfire Is and IIs was nine destroyed and four shared destroyed, five and one shared probably destroyed and seven damaged.) was shot down and captured on 9 August 1941 while leading the Tangmere Wing during a "Circus" raid.

Another type of operation flown by Fighter Command was the "Rhubarb": a low-level ground-attack mission by small numbers of fighters, usually under low cloud. Against aircraft flying these missions the 20 mm and 37 mm flak guns were the most successful opponents. Another well-known Wing Commander, "Bob" Tuck, was shot down by a multi-barrel, 20 mm Flakvierling 38 position and captured by German troops on 28 January 1942 while flying a "Rhubarb". Many other Spitfires were shot down by German fighters.

By mid-1941, with Operation Barbarossa soon to be under way, the only Luftwaffe fighter units left to guard against the RAF were JG 2 and JG 26. These two units, manned for the most part with experienced and aggressive pilots, were fully capable of mounting a highly successful defence, particularly when they started re-equipping with the Focke-Wulf Fw 190.

=== The Fw 190 challenge ===
The introduction of the Focke-Wulf Fw 190 in late 1941 along the Channel front came as a complete surprise to Fighter Command. At first it was assumed that the new radial-engined fighters were Curtiss 75-C1s which had been captured from the French. It soon became clear that the new aircraft easily outperformed the Spitfire V and appeared to be more heavily armed. Very little was known about this fighter until 23 June 1942 when Oberleutnant Armin Faber of JG 2 landed his Fw 190A-3 at RAF Pembrey by mistake. In comparison tests, the new German fighter proved superior to the then-current Mk Vb in all aspects except turning radius.

The Fw 190 was at least 25 to 30 mph faster than the Spitfire V, and could climb and accelerate to combat speeds more quickly. Spitfire pilots who flew over enemy territory using the standard technique of flying at low rpm and high boost pressures to economise on fuel often found themselves in trouble when intercepted by Fw 190s. If "bounced" while cruising at low speeds it could take a Spitfire up to two minutes to accelerate to top speed. The only way it was thought that a Spitfire could evade attack was to cruise at high speed and go into a shallow dive with the throttle open. Provided the Fw 190 was seen in time, it could be forced into a long stern chase. As a result of the high number of casualties being inflicted on Spitfires the Air Tactics Department (A.T.D) issued a guide on the optimum engine settings to use while flying over enemy territory; in part it read:

2. At the present stage of the war, the enemy in France is equipped with the Fw 190, a fighter with an excellent rate of climb and good acceleration. To defeat this aircraft and to avoid casualties on our side, our aircraft must fly as fast as possible whenever they are in the combat zone.

"The Focke-Wulf 190 certainly gave the British a shock", wrote Douglas Bader in his autobiography Fight for the sky; "it out-climbed and out-dived the Spitfire. Now for the first time the Germans were out-flying our pilots." They were also outgunning them. For the best part of the year, and until the arrival of the Spitfire Mk IX, the Fw 190 commanded the skies.

Spitfire L.F Mk Vb of 316 (Polish) "Warszawski" Squadron. This Spitfire has the "cropped" Merlin 45 series engine and the "clipped" wings.

From late 1942, in an attempt to achieve some degree of parity with the Fw 190, some squadrons received the L.F Mark VB. This version had reduced diameter supercharger impeller blades on the Merlin for optimum performance at lower altitudes and the wing-tips were removed and replaced by short fairings to improve their rate of roll. These aircraft were unofficially known by their pilots as "clipped, cropped and clapped" Spits, referring to the fact that many of these Spitfires, thus modified, had seen better days ("clapped out").

The flight performance of an early Mk IX, which was flown against the Focke-Wulf in July 1942, was found to be closely comparable. Still, at altitudes of 18,000–20,000 ft (5,500–6,100 m) and at 3,000 ft (910 m) and below, the AFDU noted the Fw 190 was "a little faster". Once again the Mk IX had a superior turning radius although it could be outdived and outrolled by the German fighter. The Spitfire being tested was hampered through being fitted with an old float-type carburettor: the great majority of Mk IXs were fitted with negative-G carburettors. These results contributed to the further development of the Rolls-Royce Merlin 61 series engine into versions optimised for High (70 series) Medium (63) and Low (66) altitude performance: this led to the use of the prefixes H.F, F, and L.F which were later applied to the Mks VII through to IX, depending on which version of the engine was installed, e.g., L.F Mk. IX.

The Spitfire V units continued to take heavy casualties, often inflicting little damage in return, throughout 1941 and well into 1942. Once the Mk IX started arriving in sufficient numbers this trend started to even out, although the 190s in particular continued to be a serious threat. Hans "Assi" Hahn claimed 53 of his 108 kills against Spitfires and Josef "Pips" Priller claimed 68 of his 101 victories against the type, making him the highest scoring "Spitfire killer" in the Luftwaffe. Most of these victories were against the Mark V.

"Operation Jubilee", the amphibious raid on Dieppe on 19 August 1942, was supported by 48 Spitfire squadrons and would prove to be a turning point in RAF operations over Europe. While Fighter Command claimed to have inflicted heavy casualties on the Luftwaffe, the balance sheet showed the reverse. Allied aircraft losses amounted to 106, including 88 RAF fighters and 18 bombers. Of the fighter losses 29 were from flak, one ran out of fuel, two collided, and one was a victim of friendly fire. Against this, 48 Luftwaffe aircraft were lost. Included in that total were 28 bombers, half of them Dornier Do 217s from KG 2. One of the two Jagdgeschwader's, JG 2, lost 14 Fw 190s and eight pilots killed. JG 26 lost six Fw 190s with their pilots. Spitfire losses stood at 70 destroyed and damaged to all causes. The Spitfire squadrons (42 with Mark Vs, and four with Mark IXs) were tasked with ground-attack, escort and air-superiority missions, so the exact number of Spitfire losses to the Fw 190 is unknown. The Luftwaffe claimed 61 of the 106 RAF machines lost, which included all types (JG 2 claimed 40 and JG 26 claimed 21 kills); (elsewhere listed as 69 and 38 respectively).

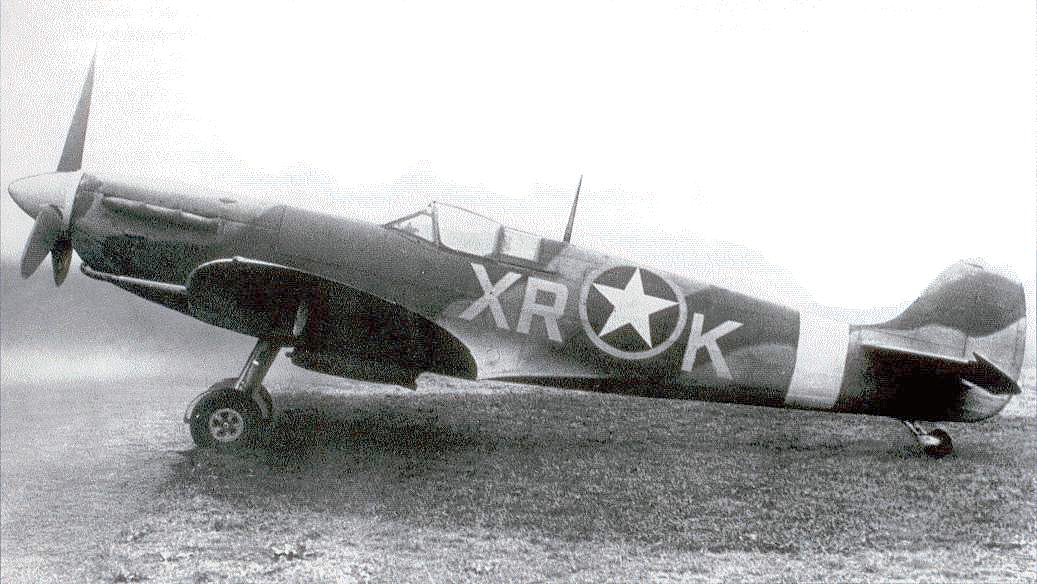
A Vb of 71 (Eagle) Squadron, a unit manned by volunteers from the USA. In September 1942 this unit was disbanded and its pilots and aircraft transferred to the USAAF, becoming the 334th Fighter Squadron, part of the 4th Fighter Group.

This operation saw the successful combat debut of the Spitfire Mk IX and the lessons learned from "Jubilee" would contribute to the formation of the 2nd Tactical Air Force (2 TAF). 2 TAF would combine RAF fighter, fighter/bomber and light and medium bomber squadrons into a powerful army support organisation which would help lead to the successful outcome of D-Day. Experience from the Desert Air Force in particular, had shown that the most successful and adaptable instrument of close support for the ground forces was the fighter-bomber. In accordance with this, many of the Spitfire squadrons incorporated into 2 TAF would later take on the fighter-bomber role as their primary mission.

Operating within the RAF were three "Eagle" squadrons: units manned by American pilots who had joined the RAF. First formed in 1940 and initially equipped with Hurricanes, these units converted to Spitfire Vbs in 1941. They were re-equipped with Spitfire IXs in early September 1942 and were disbanded in late-September 1942 as their aircrew and aircraft were transferred to the fledgling USAAF's Eighth Air Force to become the nucleus of the 4th Fighter Group.

=== The high-altitude bombers ===
Towards the end of August 1942, the Luftwaffe began launching high-level bombing raids against England. A unit called the Höhenkampfkommando der Versuchsstelle für Höhenflüge, equipped with a small number of Junkers Ju 86R bombers, was able to bomb England from above 40,000 ft (12,000 m) without impediment from RAF fighters, or from anti-aircraft guns. On one such attack on 28 August a single bomb dropped on Bristol killed 48 people and injured another 46. To counter the threat, the "High Altitude Flight" was formed at RAF Northolt; this unit used a pair of Spitfire Mk Vcs which were converted into IXs by Rolls-Royce at the Hucknall plant. These were stripped of everything not required for the role of high-level interception, lightening them by 450 lb each. On 12 September 1942 Flying Officer Emanuel Galitzine, flying BS273, (Note: The serial number BF273, which should have belonged to a Bristol Blenheim was applied in error by the groundcrew.) successfully intercepted a Ju 86R piloted by Fw Horst Göetz and commanded by Leutnant Erich Sommer (Note: Erich Sommer was later to command the first unit equipped with the Arado Ar 234 jet reconnaissance bomber.) above Southampton at 41,000 ft (12,000 m). The ensuing battle went up to 43,000 ft (13,000 m) and was the highest air battle of the war. However, problems were caused by the freezing air at that altitude and the combat was not decisive: the port cannon suffered a jam and, whenever the pilot fired a burst, the aircraft would slew and fall out of the sky. The bomber escaped safely with just one hit to its port wing, but having found it to be vulnerable to the RAF at high altitudes, the Luftwaffe launched no further high-altitude attacks against England.

=== Debut of the Griffon engine Mk XII ===
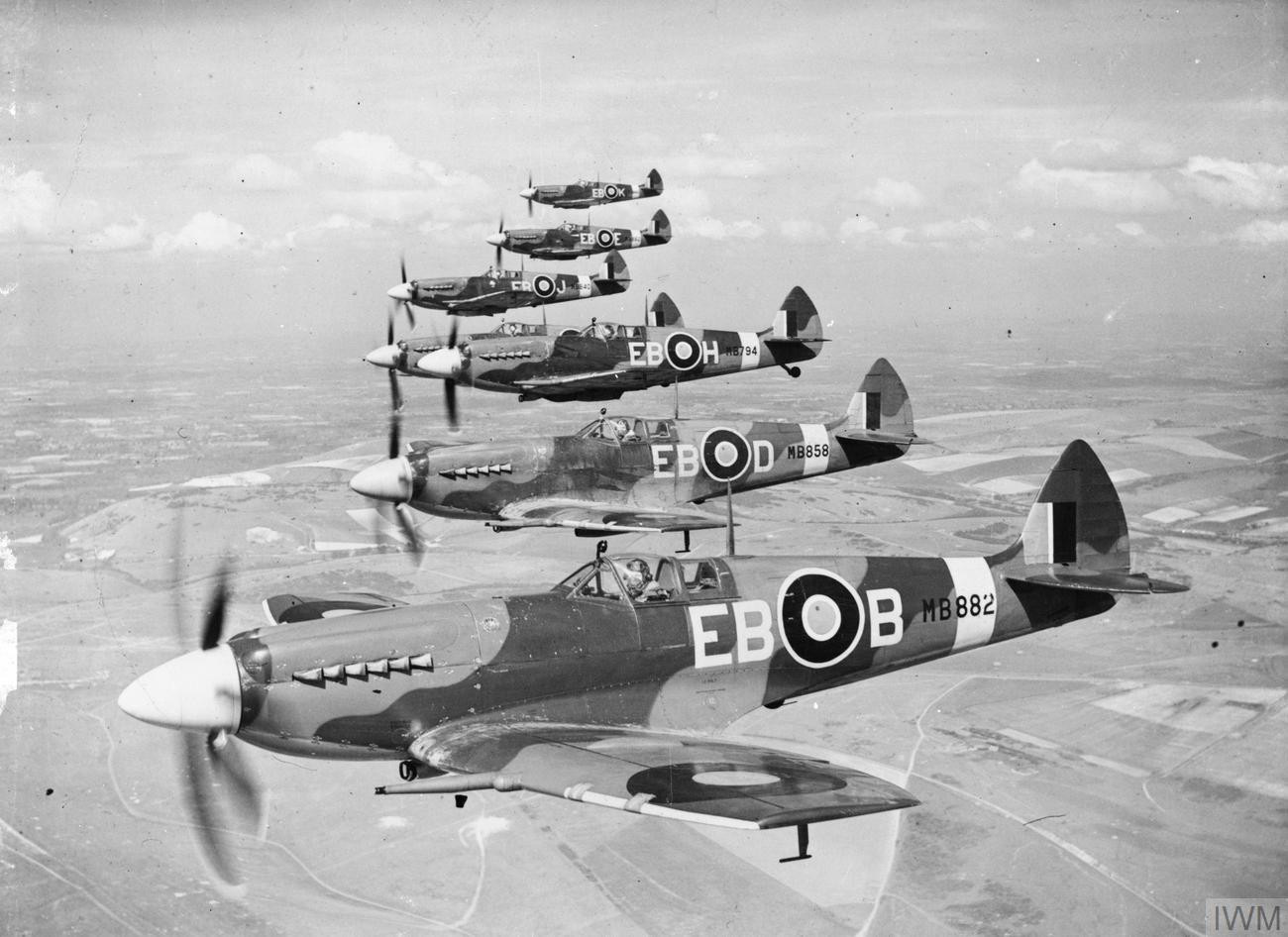
Spitfire F Mk XIIs of 41 Sqn. MB882, was flown by Flt Lt Donald Smith, RAAF.

On 24 February 1943, the first of the Rolls-Royce Griffon engined Spitfire variants, the F Mk XII was accepted into RAF service, with the first examples being delivered to 41 Squadron. The first operational flight was made on 3 April, with the Mk XII's first victory, a Junkers Ju 88 occurring two weeks later. The only other squadron to use the variant was 91 Squadron, which started re-equipping on 20 April; this unit's first XII victories were five Fw 190 fighter-bombers of SKG 10 which were claimed shot down during an attempted low altitude raid on Folkestone on the evening of 25 May.

The Mk XII had superb performance at low and medium altitudes, though the performance dropped away above about 15,000 feet. In spite of a reluctance on the part of German fighters to be drawn into low-altitude combat the Spitfire XIIs scored several successes against low-flying fighter-bomber Fw 190s and Bf 109 Gs attacking targets in and around the south-eastern coastal towns of Britain. In June 1943 41 and 91 Squadrons the only ones to be fully equipped with this version, moved to RAF Westhampnett and formed the Westhampnett Wing led first by Wng Cdr. Rhys Thomas and then, from August 1943, by Wing Cdr. Raymond Harries (Note: Raymond Harries was the most successful of the Griffon engined Spitfire pilots, shooting down 10 (some sources say 11) enemy aircraft, all while flying the F. Mk XII.).

As the American strategic (B-17 and B-24) and medium (B-26 and A-20) bombing campaigns gathered momentum in mid-1943, the need for fighter escort meant much of Fighter Command's Spitfire force was used, while the U.S. fighter groups worked up to operational status. The limited combat radius of the Spitfire meant the RAF support operations were restricted to the North Sea-coastal regions of Belgium and north-western France and across the English Channel to Normandy. As the battle intensified over occupied Europe, USAAF fighters like the P-47, P-38 and from early 1944 P-51 bore the brunt of bomber protection. Spitfire IX squadrons had to bide their time until the invasion of Europe, before fully engaging the Luftwaffe's Jagdwaffe.

=== Most successful Spitfire: EN398 ===
From surviving records it would appear that the most successful individual Spitfire was EN398, a Mk IX fitted with a Merlin 63. This aircraft was built at Chattis Hill, a Shadow factory run by Supermarine, making its first flight on 13 February 1943. Five days later EN398 was delivered to No. 402 Squadron RCAF which was part of the Kenley Wing. (Note: The four units which made up the Kenley Wing in March 1943 were all RCAF units: No. 403 Squadron RCAF and No. 416 Squadron RCAF with Spitfire XIs and No. 411 Squadron RCAF and No. 421 Squadron RCAF with Spitfire Mk Vbs. 411 and 421 Squadrons re-equipped with Mk IXs later in the year.) On 16 March Acting Wing Commander "Johnnie" Johnson arrived to take command of the four Canadian units based at Kenley. EN398 was still undergoing acceptance tests in a hangar:

I found the engineer officer and together we had a look at her, gleaming and bright in a new spring coat of camouflage paint. Later I took her up for a few aerobatics to get the feel of her, for this was the first time I had flown a [Mark] 9. She seemed very fast, the engine was sweet and she responded to the controls as only a thoroughbred can. I decided she should be mine, and I never had occasion to regret the choice.

As a wing commander, Johnson was allowed to paint his initials JE-J on the sides of the fuselage, in place of the usual squadron code letters AE- He also had the Spitfire's guns re-harmonised to converge their fire to a single point ahead of the aircraft, rather than the standard pattern which spread the rounds evenly over a circle a few yards across. The first successful engagement for Johnson in EN398 was on 3 April 1943 when he shot down an Fw 190. By the time Johnson relinquished command of the Kenley Wing in September 1943 he had shot down 12 enemy aircraft, shared in the destruction of five more, inflicted damage on six and shared in damaging one, all while flying EN398. Also, Squadron Leader Robert "Buck" McNair (Note: Robert "Buck" McNair of the RCAF ended the war with a total of 16 enemy aircraft destroyed, with five probably destroyed and 14 damaged.) shot down an Fw 190 while flying this Spitfire on 20 July 1943. EN398 was eventually sold for scrap in October 1949.

The next most successful Spitfire was EN572 FY-H, flown by New Zealander Flt. Lt Johnny Checketts of 611 Squadron (Biggin Hill Wing). This Spitfire was a Mk. VC converted to a Mk IX by Rolls-Royce and was powered by a Merlin 61; it was delivered to 611 Squadron in April 1943. When Checketts was posted to 485(NZ) Squadron in July 1943 he took EN572, which became OU-H. While flying EN572 Checketts shot down 13 enemy aircraft, with one probable and six damaged. Checketts was shot down over France in this Spitfire on 6 September 1943, but escaped, returning to England seven weeks later.

== D-day to VE Day ==
=== Normandy: June–August 1944 ===
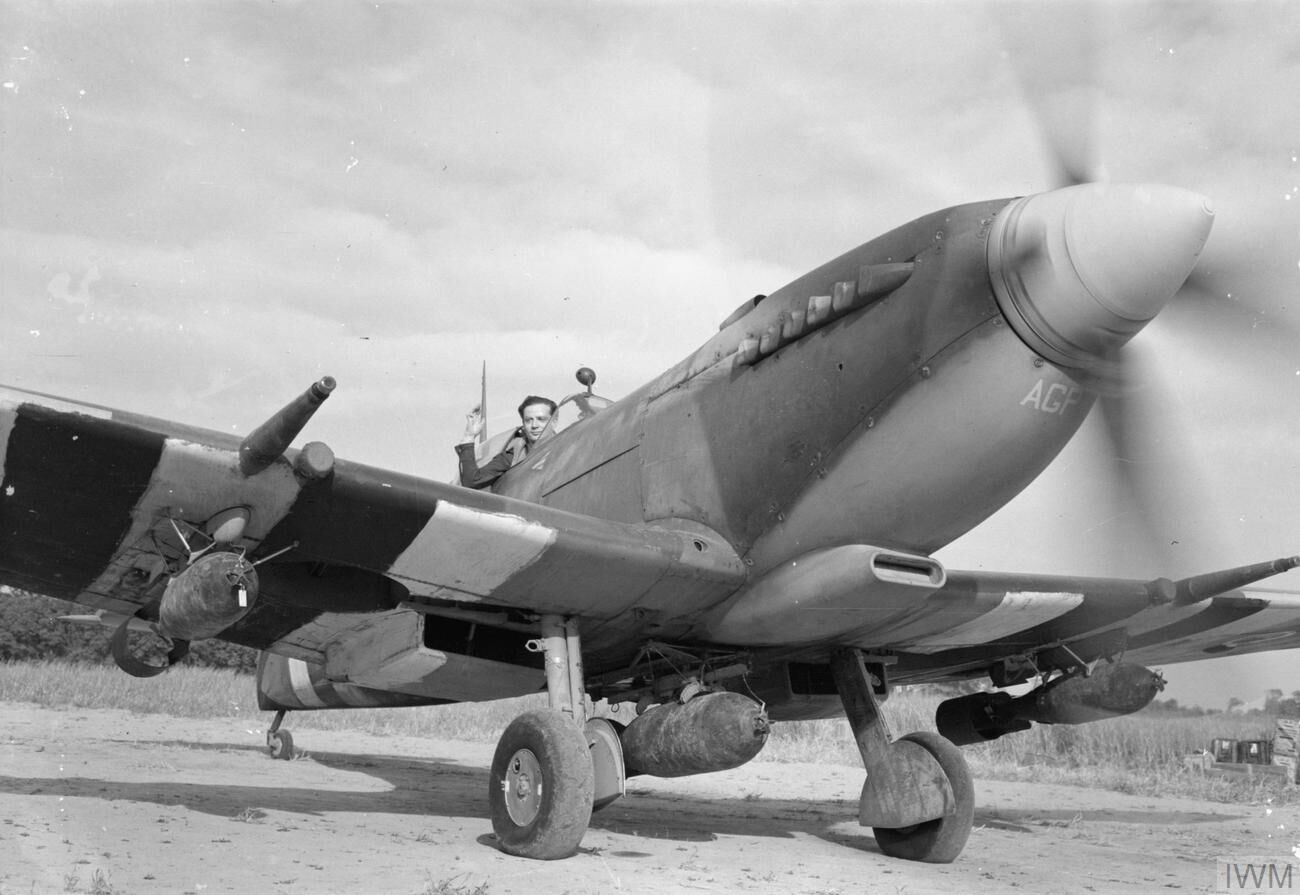
Geoffrey Page, commander of 125 Wing of the Second TAF, about to take off on a sortie from Longues-sur-Mer, Normandy in his Spitfire Mk IXE 'AGP' with a 500-lb GP bomb under the fuselage and two 250-lb GP bombs on wing racks (1944)

After the Normandy landings, some Spitfires (Griffon and Merlin engine marks) were retained in Britain to counter the V-1 flying bomb offensive in mid-1944 as part of the ADGB. Supplies of a new aviation fuel, which was called "150 Grade", arrived from America in March 1944 and sufficient quantities were available to be used by ADGB fighters as the V-1 offensive started. The new fuel enabled the Rolls-Royce Merlin and Griffon engines to operate at higher boost pressures, especially at lower altitudes, for the duration of the anti-V-1 campaign.

The bulk of the Spitfire squadrons, which by D-Day were incorporated into the Second Tactical Air Force, were progressively moved across the Channel, operating from advanced landing grounds in Normandy, close behind the front-lines. From late August 1944, as the Allied ground forces overran German forces in France and moved forward into Belgium and parts of the Netherlands, the Spitfire units of 2 TAF moved to new airfields in support. By this time, as air supremacy (as opposed to air superiority) had been achieved, and in line with 2 TAF's doctrine on the use of fighter-bombers most of the Merlin engined Mk IX and XVI units were used in the fighter-bomber role. This meant that these units concentrated on roaming over German territory, attacking ground targets of opportunity and providing tactical ground support to the army units. In this role there were fewer opportunities to engage Luftwaffe fighters. A notable incident occurred on 17 July 1944, when a Spitfire of 602 Squadron attacked the staff car of Generalfeldmarschall Erwin Rommel, wounding him and removing him from command of Army Group B.

One tactical innovation adopted by 2nd TAF Spitfires was the "Fluid Six"' formation, which had been developed through combat experience in Europe and North Africa. The first use of the tactic dated back to at least November 1941. It is known that No. 112 Squadron RAF used this in the North African campaign. This formation "was considered the best fighter formation of the war". It abandoned the leader-wingman combination that had existed before. Instead, it was based on three pairs of Spitfires which could provide mutual cover and support: the pairs were 'stacked' in altitude so that the pair (e.g.: 5 & 6) flying up-sun, and covering the tails of the leaders (1 & 2), flew higher, while the other pair (e.g.: 3 & 4) flew lower. Any attacking aircraft could be sandwiched between two pairs of Spitfires, no matter the direction or altitude of the attack. Another advantage of this formation was that when operating at squadron strength a flight commander was able to lead six aircraft of his own flight, "whereas, with formations of four there would more likely be one formation from each flight with the third consisting of aircraft from another flight."

Fluid Six formation as flown by Spitfires of 2nd TAF 1944–1945

The Merlin's water and glycol cooling system, as with all liquid-cooled aero-engines, proved vulnerable to small arms fire, with one hit in the radiator or coolant pipes often being enough to drain the system, eventually causing the engine to seize or catch fire. Although some pilots were able to gain enough altitude to glide back to a forward airfield, the low altitudes normally flown during ground attack missions meant that light (up to 30 mm) flak claimed most of the Spitfire IXs and XVIs lost while operating as fighter-bombers. Just 21 of the 152 Spitfires that were destroyed or damaged from all causes from 1–30 June 1944 were shot down by German fighters.

Flight Lieutenant Raymond Baxter, who had flown Spitfires almost continually since 1941, flew Mk XVIs on fighter-bomber operations while commanding 'A' Flight of 602 Squadron attacking V-2 rocket launching sites in the Netherlands:

The usual force to attack these small targets was four to six Spitfires, each with either one 500 and two 250 pound bombs or two 250 pounders and a long range tanks... As we crossed into enemy territory we were liable to be engaged with predicted fire from heavy 88mm guns. But in a Spitfire this was no great danger, provided one continually changed one's direction and altitude in a series of long climbing or diving turns... the V-2 targets were defended with light flak so when we reached the target area our approach tactics would vary...Accurate bombing was dependant on accurate flying during the dive...the speed would build up quite rapidly, to a maximum of about 360 mph before the release. When he judged the altitude to be about 3,000 ft each pilot let go of his bombs in a salvo, then did a 5G pull-up to bring the nose up to horizontal... the drill was to make a high-speed getaway using the ground for cover.

By the end of August, the German ground forces were in full retreat and the Jagdwaffe began pulling back to Germany to re-equip and train new pilots. The speed of the withdrawal meant that the Spitfire units of 2 TAF began to find themselves out of range of the front until new forward airfields could be built or those previously used by the Luftwaffe rebuilt. As a consequence there was little air-to-air combat involving Spitfires until mid-September, although flak continued to take a toll.

=== Spitfire Spotters ===
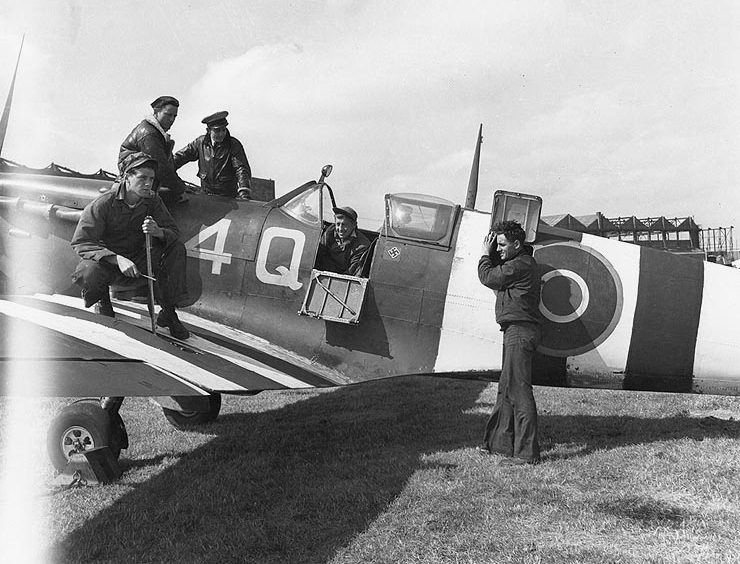
A Spitfire Mk. V being serviced by U.S. Navy groundcrew of VCS-7, RNAS Lee-on-Solent, June 1944

During D-Day, Spitfires were operated as Spotters by U.S. Navy Cruiser Scouting Squadron Seven (VCS-7) in support of United States Navy and Royal Navy cruisers and battleships bombarding land targets. In this role the Spitfires would locate targets and guide the fire of the ships onto the target. US spotting units normally used floatplanes, either SOC Seagulls or OS2U Kingfishers but because of their vulnerability against fighters, it was decided that 17 Cruiser Spotter (VCS) and Battleship Observation (VO) pilots aboard the heavy cruisers Augusta (CA-31), Tuscaloosa (CA-37) and Quincy (CA-71) and the battleships Arkansas (BB-33), Texas (BB-35) and Nevada (BB-36), would be trained to fly RAF Spitfire Mk Vbs and Seafire IIIs. This unit, along with two RAF squadrons, 26 and 63, also flying Spitfire Vbs and four FAA squadrons 808, 885, 886 and 897 Naval Air Squadrons flying Seafire IIIs and forming no. 3 Wing, provided valuable target coordinates and fire control during 20 days of operations. On D-Day "pooling" of the spotting units' aircraft meant that all units flew either Spitfires or Seafires.

Normally two aircraft were used; the lead aircraft functioned as the spotter while covered by a wingman, who kept a lookout for intruders. The standard altitude flown was 6,000 feet (1,800 m), although poor weather often meant that missions were flown at between 1,500–2,000 feet (460–610 m) or lower in some cases. Drop tanks were carried and a sortie could last up to two hours. Encounters against Luftwaffe fighters were rare, with four VCS-7 pilots able to evade attacks by Bf 109s and Fw 190s. Flak accounted for the only operational loss. After the bombardment of Cherbourg on 26 June Naval gunfire support missions were stopped because the battle had moved inland, out of the range of the battleships and cruisers. VCS-7 was disbanded.

During 20 days of combat operations, the aviators of VCS-7 were awarded nine Distinguished Flying Crosses, six Air Medals and five Gold Stars in lieu of additional Air Medals.

The Seafires of No. 3 Wing encountered German fighters on a number of occasions suffering 3 losses and achieving 2 victories.

=== September 1944 to May 1945 ===
In September 1944, with the end of the anti-"Diver" campaign, the Griffon-engined Mk XIV units 41, 350 and 610 Squadrons were transferred from the ADGB to 2 TAF and began operating from RAF Lympne. At about the same time 322 (Dutch) Squadron, which had been equipped with the Mk XIV, reverted to Spitfire IXs. On the last day of September 130 and No. 402 Squadron RCAF, also equipped with Mk XIVs, flew to airfield B.82, Grave. Their arrival was timely as they, along with the Hawker Tempest units, were needed to counter the Me 262 nuisance raids. In December the three Lympne based units flew to join the others on the Continent, eventually becoming part of 125 Wing. Further deliveries of the potent Mk XIV were made to fighter-reconnaissance units and in February 1945, 610 Squadron was disbanded to help maintain the level of aircraft and pilots of these units. Along with the Hawker Tempest squadrons, the Spitfire XIVs provided the 2 TAF with modern fighters for air-superiority, with the Spitfire being the primary high-altitude fighter, while the Tempest operated at low-to-medium altitude.

As events turned out, the only F.R. unit equipped with F.R. Mk. XIVs was No. 403 Squadron RCAF and although its primary role was tactical reconnaissance, the unit also engaged in fighter sweeps resulting in successful encounters with Luftwaffe aircraft, including the destruction of an Me 262.

Spitfires took part in the Defence of the Reich campaign, providing Avro Lancaster bombers with fighter escort. Targets were attacked over an area ranging from German-occupied Dutch territory into the heart of Germany. The Second Tactical Air Force notes identified flak and specialist "flak trains" as the main threat during this period. The Germans had developed special flak wagons to protect valuable transport trains from air attack and "set traps" for unwary Allied fighter pilots. The trains would be disguised to look like vulnerable and tempting targets, which when attacked, would open up its "wagons" to reveal anti-aircraft guns that inflicted losses on the Spitfire units.

Pilots still had to be aware that they were in hostile skies and care had to be taken to avoid being surprised. On 8 December the 2nd TAF swept the Dulmen-Munster area. While attacking a train they were bounced by a dozen German fighters, Fw 190s and Bf 109s. Flt Lt Harry Walmsley described the Spitfire XIV's performance against the Bf 109:

They definitely caught us by surprise. I think they had been on patrol, or had been scrambled, and when they saw the smoke from the train they knew where we were and attacked out of the cloud. The Spitfire XIV is definitely better than the Me 109, as I could do a better climbing turn even with my drop tanks still on!

During this engagement, Walmsley scored the third of his 12 kills. Spitfires were sometimes mistakenly attacked by USAAF P-51s. One such incident occurred on 31 December 1944, when 610 Squadron RAF was attacked. Using the Spitfire's "stunning" climb performance, pilots were "easily" able to escape and evade the Mustangs. In December 1944, RAF Fighter Command lost 53 Spitfires on the western front to all causes. Just eight fell to enemy aircraft. On 29 December Flt Lt Richard Audet, a French Canadian in No. 411 Squadron RCAF, shot down three Fw 190s and two Bf 109s during one sortie. Audet claimed a further five aircraft before he was shot down and killed in his Spitfire IX on 3 March 1945, while strafing a train. On 1 January 1945 the Luftwaffe launched Operation Bodenplatte. Spitfire units took part in the air fighting that day, destroying at least 32 German fighters for the loss of 13 Spitfires. Of these, seven were shot down in aerial combat, the remainder were strafed on the ground.

== Photo-reconnaissance ==
Before the Second World War, the RAF relied on Bristol Blenheims to carry out photo-reconnaissance as a secondary task as long range photographic reconnaissance was not considered important. Short range photo-reconnaissance was left to the Army Cooperation Command Westland Lysanders. Neither aircraft had the speed or altitude performance to avoid enemy fighters and their light armament meant that fighting their way to a target to take photographs was a forlorn hope. Both aircraft types had many losses when faced with modern fighters and A.A fire.

=== Early photo-reconnaissance Spitfires ===
Shortly before the Second World War started Flg. Off. Maurice Longbottom submitted a paper to the Air Ministry, in which he proposed that the RAF equip itself with small, unarmed aircraft, stripped of unnecessary weight and equipped with cameras and extra fuel, to rely on high speed, a fast climb and high altitude to avoid enemy defences. He was thinking primarily about the Spitfire as the ideal aircraft. Although his idea was received with interest, it was shelved because there were not enough Spitfires to divert from Fighter Command.

When early operations proved the vulnerability of the Blenheims and Lysanders, in October 1939 the Australian Sidney Cotton, Acting Wing Commander of the newly formed and highly secret "Heston Flight", met with Air Chief Marshal Hugh Dowding, AOC of Fighter Command and persuaded him to release two Spitfires to his unit. Cotton had already proved Longbottom's theory to be right by using a modified Lockheed 12A on clandestine photo-reconnaissance missions over Germany.

The two Spitfires were "Cottonised" by removing the radio, stripping out the armament and adding downward-facing F24 cameras with 5 in (13 cm) lenses to replace the inner-wing guns. All panel lines and the gun-ports were filled in with plaster of Paris and a special light "Camoutint Green" was applied to the aircraft and polished. Thus modified, the Spitfire was capable of reaching over 390 miles per hour (630 km/h).

While the fighter versions of the Spitfire stayed in Britain, the first PR missions were flown from bases in France by Cotton's unit which was renamed "No. 2 Camouflage Unit". The first RAF high-speed, high-altitude photo-reconnaissance mission of the war took place on 18 November 1939 when Flt. Lt. "Shorty" Longbottom took off from Seclin and attempted to photograph Aachen from 33,000 ft (10,000 m).

After the initial successes of these aircraft, more Mk I Spitfires were converted in different ways for different reconnaissance missions. On 17 January 1940, 2 Camouflage Unit was renamed the "Photographic Development Unit" (PDU), while another PR Unit, 212 Squadron was formed in France. Five months later, on 17 June 1940, Sidney Cotton was sacked from the RAF, for taking money to fly a French businessman to the UK, while he was evacuating British agents from Paris. The following year, he was awarded an OBE in recognition of his contribution to the development of photographic reconnaissance. The PDU was expanded, eventually becoming 1 Photographic Reconnaissance Unit (1 PRU) in November 1940, operating from RAF Benson as part of RAF Coastal Command.

On 3 June 1940, Hauptmann Werner Mölders of III./JG53 claimed a lone Spitfire shot down near Paris: it is more than likely that this was a Spitfire of 212 Squadron. On 13 June 1940, Flg. Off. George Patterson Christie, a Canadian pilot of the PDU, attacked a Fiat BR.20 bomber off the coast of Monaco and by repeatedly diving at it, forced it to land in the sea. Patterson was awarded the DFC for this feat. He was also reprimanded by Cotton for playing at being a fighter pilot when his primary duty was to bring back photographs.

On 22 February 1941, at the request of Dr R. V. Jones, a PRU type G Spitfire, flown by Flg. Off. W. K. Manifould, took the first clear photographs of a Freya radar. In retaliation for an incident six days earlier, when a Sgt Parrot failed to bring back photos due to heavy flak, Manifould also strafed the AA posts and radar station, rendering the latter useless. On 5 December 1941, again at the request of Dr Jones, a PRU Spitfire flown by Flt. Lt Tony Hill was able to photograph a Würzburg radar from 200 feet (61 m) at Bruneval on the French coast. This led directly to the Bruneval raid in which Würzburg components and radar operators were captured from the Germans.

Flying PR missions was not an easy occupation. Spitfire pilots often flew missions lasting seven hours or more; the cramped cockpit was uncomfortable, although the introduction of heating and, later in the war, pressurization, relieved some of the discomfort. Early PR Spitfires lacked radios and, in later versions which did have radio, the pilot was expected to maintain radio silence throughout the flight. The pilot of a high-flying Spitfire would keep constant watch on the rear- view mirror to make sure that a contrail would not betray its presence, and he also had to keep an eye out for enemy fighters trying to intercept. Without the help of another crew member a PR Spitfire pilot had to be a good navigator, usually relying on dead reckoning. Once over the target to be photographed, a precise course and altitude was set and maintained. Even a small deviation from straight and level flight could mean that the cameras would miss a small target by hundreds of yards. Several different paint schemes were used by the early photo-reconnaissance Spitfires until an overall "PRU Blue" was adopted for the majority of PR aircraft from late 1941.

Low-altitude ("dicing") missions, such as the one on the Bruneval Würzburg and Freya radar position, (Note: Freya and Würzburg were often used in complementary installations.) were usually flown under low cloud, with the pilot constantly on the lookout for enemy fighters and flak positions. These missions were much more dangerous than the high-altitude missions. At high speed and low altitude there was little time to aim the oblique camera: a tiny black + on the side of the canopy was lined up with a small black stripe painted on the aileron and, as the aircraft flew by the target, the pilot had to estimate when to start taking photographs. The only way to successfully take pictures and survive was to take the defences by surprise. Failing that the pilot was supposed to give up and fly home, and he was not allowed to fly over the same target again that day, or the next. Spitfires engaged in low-altitude "dicing" missions were often painted in either overall white or in a very pale "Camoutint Pink", which was an ideal colour against cloud cover. Low-attitude oblique missions also required great skill in timing the photographs. The camera, which was behind the pilot seat, would be pointed sideways on aircraft flying oblique missions. The object would disappear under the wing as the aircraft was flying by it, and during those moments of lack of eye contact, the photo had to be taken. The pilot had to guess when it would reappear behind the wing and fire the shutter accordingly.

PRU Spitfires also kept a constant watch on the German capital ships in based in Brest harbour throughout 1941 to February 1942, as well as maintaining operations over Norway.

The first Spitfire to be posted to the Mediterranean theatre was one operated by 1 PRU which arrived on Malta on 22 September 1941. This aircraft was then grounded for three weeks while awaiting replacements for its badly worn tyres. PR Spitfires continued to operate off Malta in ones and twos, usually being re-allocated while en route to North Africa.

Other overseas deployments of Spitfires had seen three Mk IVs being sent to Vaenga (renamed Severomorsk in 1951), in North Russia, to keep on eye on German warships during the operation to get Convoy PQ 18 through to Russia. While there, they carried Soviet markings. These aircraft were later formally handed on to the Soviet Air Force.

=== Late photo-reconnaissance Spitfires ===
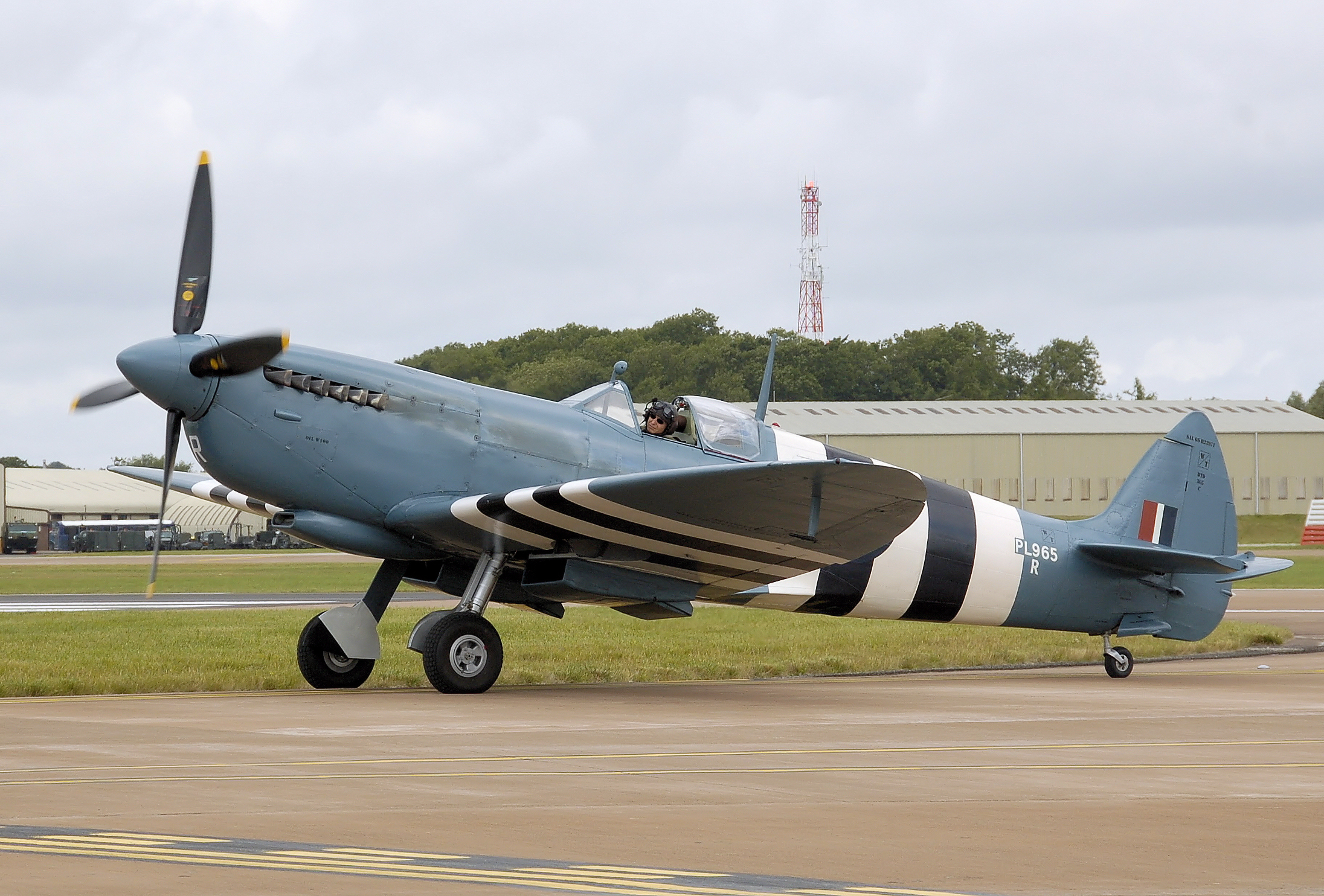
A preserved PR Mk XI Spitfire (PL965) in PRU Blue (2008)

In 1942, the two-stage Merlin 60 aero engine became available for reconnaissance aircraft. The first 15 Spitfires with the new engine were conversions of standard Mk IXs made by the workshops of 1 PRU at RAF Heston. One of the best known operations undertaken by the Mk IX conversion was to provide photographs of the four dams slated to be destroyed by Operation Chastise; a PR Mk IX flown by Flg. Off. F. D. Fray brought back a famous series of photos showing the Moehne and Eder dams the morning after the raid.

The PR Mk XI was the first version of the Spitfire to be built specifically as a photoreconnaissance (PR) aircraft and started replacing all of the earlier conversions of Mk Is, IIs and Vs from mid-1943. The PR Mk XIII replaced the PR Mk VII as a low-altitude tactical-reconnaissance aircraft at about this time. By late 1942, the early PRUs had been expanded and formalised into several squadrons, and with the formation of the Second Tactical Air Force (or 2nd TAF) in 1943, Army Co-operation Command was wound up and many of its units became dedicated PR Squadrons. The photo-reconnaissance squadrons, especially those units in theatres outside Britain, were self-contained intelligence units; not only did they have the usual aircraft and maintenance crews but they also incorporated a large photographic section, which processed the exposed film in mobile laboratories almost as soon as the aircraft had landed. There were also photo interpreters, photo-printing staff, an intelligence section plus communications staff.

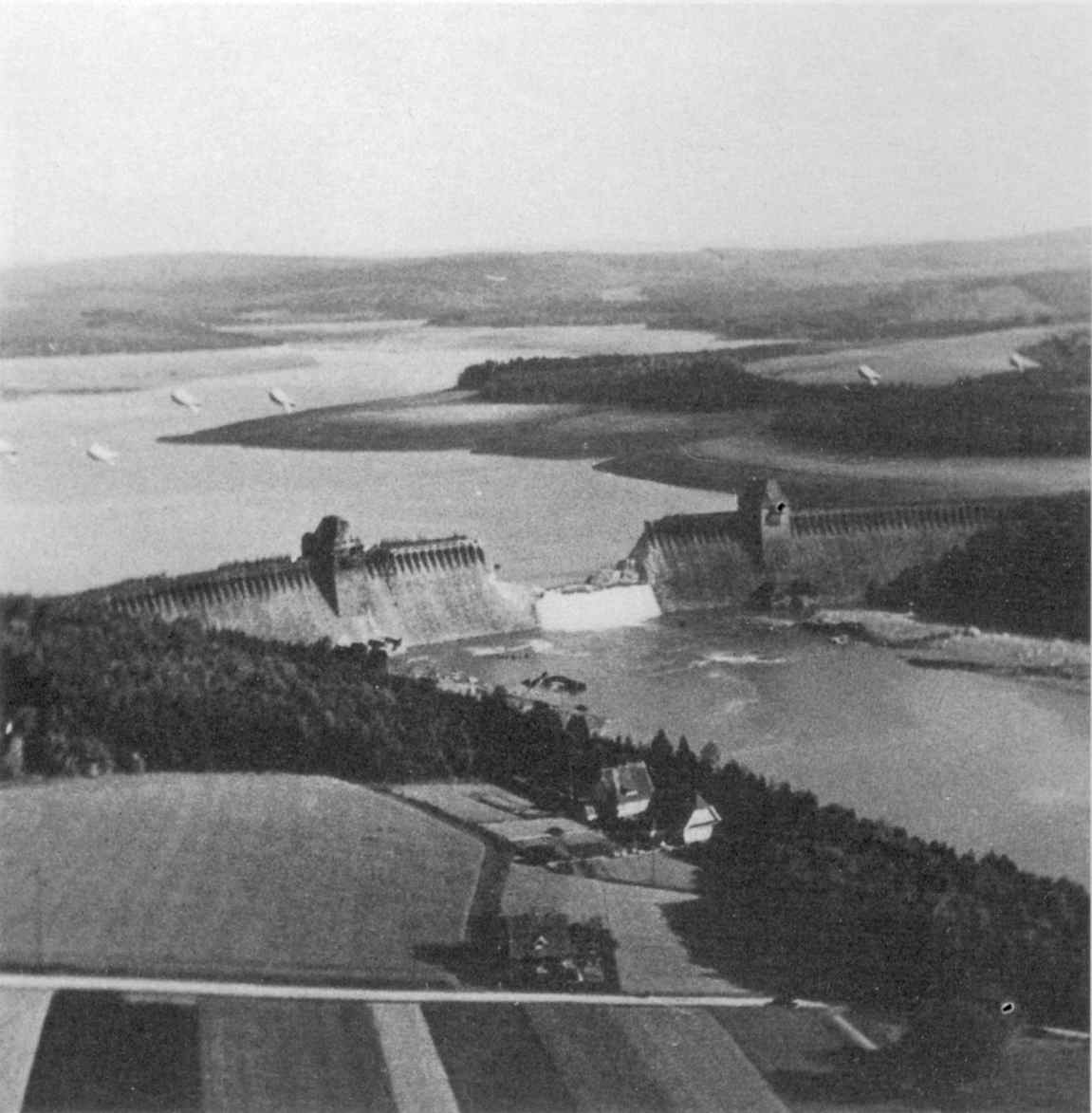
The breached Moehne Dam photographed by a PR Mk IX conversion of 542 Squadron RAF

After the Réseau AGIR reported construction in occupied France in September 1943, Spitfires and other reconnaissance aircraft (five British, five American and four Canadian squadrons) photographed V-1 facilities. A photo taken by a 542 Squadron Spitfire on 3 October 1943 depicted the Siracourt V-1 bunker (bombed January 1944), and sortie E/463 on 3 November 1943 over Bois Carré by a No. 170 Squadron RAF aircraft was the first to detect "ski-shaped buildings 240–270 feet long". As on 21 October, photo-reconnaissance sorties on 4 December 1943 to cover the whole of Northern France were conducted before the 5 December start of "Crossbow Operations Against Ski Sites". Despite Crossbow bombings, camouflaged "modified" sites were first discovered 26 April 1944 (61 modified sites were photographed by 6 June). Photos on 10 June depicting that the sites were being activated allowed image interpreters to predict the sites could launch within three days (V-1 flying bomb operations began on the night of 12/13 June 1944).

==== Combat support ====
During and after D-Day, PR Spitfires of the 2nd TAF supported the Allied armies, including strategic sorties by No. 16 Squadron RAF from 30,000 ft (9,100 m) or more using the PR Mk XI. The unit's secondary role was to provide tactical reconnaissance using the F.R Mk IX in low altitude "dicer" missions. 16 Squadron F.R Mk IXs photographed German tanks in the Arnhem area just before Operation Market Garden, and during the battle, Northolt based F.R IXs flew missions in support of the paratroops.

== Mediterranean service ==
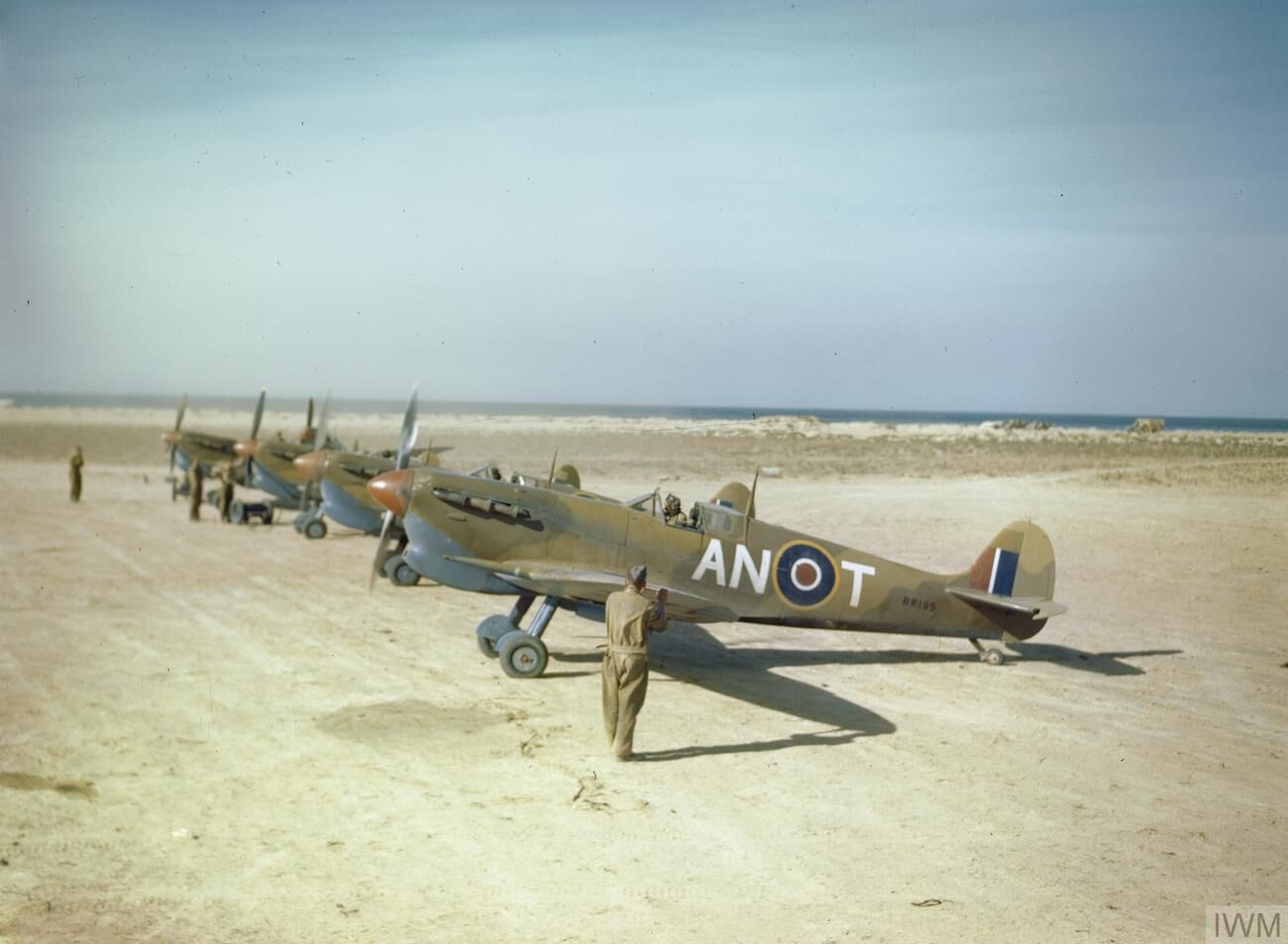
Spitfire Vc(trop) of No. 417 Squadron RCAF in Tunisia in 1943.

The Mk Vb was the first Spitfire to see extensive overseas service. On 7 March 1942, 15 Mk Vs carrying 90-gallon fuel tanks under their fuselages took off from HMS Eagle off the coast of Algeria on a 600-mile flight to Malta.

In the months that followed, some 275 Mk Vb and Vc Spitfires were delivered to the beleaguered island, with the Americans providing help by allowing the USS Wasp to be used to fly two lots of Spitfires to the islands. Wooden wedges were used to allow the Spitfires to leave the carrier with partial "takeoff" flap settings. (Once the aircraft had gained altitude, the pilot would open the flaps fully, the wedges would fall out and the flaps could then be closed.) In "Operation Calendar" on 20 April 1942, 47 Spitfires and pilots of 601 and 603 Squadrons flew from Wasp to Malta. In "Operation Bowery" on 9 May 1942, another 50 Spitfires flew from Wasp and 14 from Eagle. Sixty of them landed on Malta. One Spitfire with a defective long range fuel tank landed back on the Wasp, despite lacking a tailhook. In "Operation Style" on 3 June, a further 32 Spitfires flew to Malta from HMS Eagle, through they were intercepted en route and four were shot down. However, the carriers were thought to be vulnerable to attack from the Luftwaffe while out at sea so in late October through to early November, a total of 12 Spitfire Vcs, equipped with a single huge 170-gallon drop tank, flew direct from Gibraltar, a distance of 1,000 miles. This meant a flight time of more than five hours.

All of these Spitfires were involved in combating and finally blunting the constant air attacks being made on the island by the Luftwaffe and the Regia Aeronautica. The most successful Spitfire pilot was the Canadian Plt. Off. George Beurling of 249 Squadron who was credited with shooting down 26⅓ German and Italian aircraft between June and late October 1942.

The first Spitfire to be modified to carry underwing bombs was a Malta-based Mk Vc, EP201 X-V of 229 Squadron, which was adapted to carry one 250 lb bomb under each wing in September 1942. Many Mk V Spitfires equipped to carry a pair of 250-lb bombs attached beneath their wings were used as makeshift bombers, raiding Sicilian fortifications and air bases, and releasing their bombs at 7,000 feet as they dived at an optimum angle of 60 degrees.

To counter the prevalent dusty conditions, the Spitfires were fitted with a large Vokes air filter under the nose, which lowered the performance of the aircraft through increased drag. The Vb and Vc(trop) (fitted with large Vokes anti-sand air filters) would also equip units of the Desert Air Force during the North African campaign by August 1942.

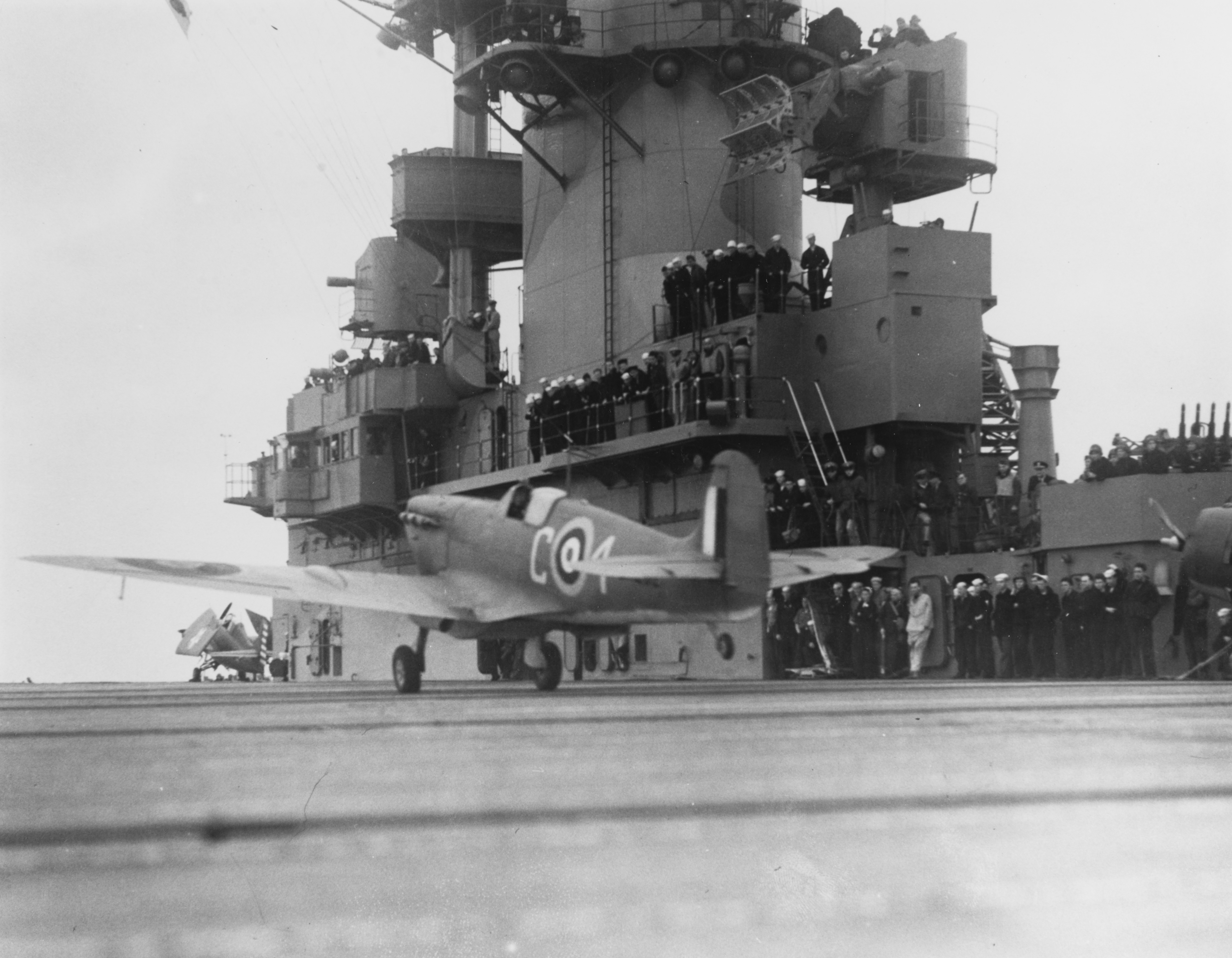
Spitfire Vc taking off from deck of USS Wasp, possibly during "Operation Bowery".

Here, the Mk Vcs were also used as tactical fighter-bombers, being equipped with a maximum load of 500 lb of bombs. Mark Vbs equipped the 4th, 31st and 52nd Fighter Groups of the USAAF in the summer of 1942, and the latter two groups continued flying them until succeeded by Mk VIIIs in mid-1943. By this time, Spitfire Mk Vcs with stronger wings and extra ammunition began to carry four 20 mm cannon. Many Mk Vs also had the new, smaller and much more efficient "Aboukir" filter instead of the ram air effect nullifying Vokes filter. The new filter was named as such due to its creation in Aboukir, Egypt by RAF mechanics.

The Spitfire V and, later, much-improved, longer-range Spitfire VIIIs also soon became available in the North African theatre and, henceforth, featured heavily with the RAF, South African Air Force and USAAF during the campaigns in Sicily and Italy.

In the Mediterranean theatre and in Italy, the Mk VIII also fought with the United States Army Air Force. The 31st and 52nd Fighter Groups operated the fighter for some time until, in March 1944, their aircraft were replaced by the P-51B/C Mustang, a change which did not thrill most of the pilots according to many 31st FG members. However, the American fighter was adopted because of its long-range escort capability. Over 300 kills were claimed by the two fighter groups while flying Spitfires.

=== Spitfire versus Italian fighters ===
In the Mediterranean theatre, the Spitfire VC encountered the Macchi C.202 "Folgore", an aircraft which was a close match. It was widely considered superior to both the Hawker Hurricane and Curtiss P-40 Kittyhawks it fought against, at first on the Libyan front from November 1941, and the equal of the Mk V. It was claimed that it was able to outturn all three, although the Spitfire had a superior rate of climb. In 1943 the C.202 was partly superseded by the Macchi C.205 "Veltro" which was an improved version of the "Folgore". The Veltro was much respected by Allied and Luftwaffe pilots alike. In action, the C.205s proved to be extremely effective. One of the top-scoring British fighter pilots of the Second World War, Grp Capt W.G.G. Duncan Smith, DSO DFC, greatly respected the Macchi fighters, stating: "In encounters with Macchi 205s particularly we were up against aircraft that could turn and dog-fight with our Spitfires extremely well."

Laddie Lucas recalled that the Reggiane Re.2001 could also be a difficult opponent for the Spitfire V, particularly when caught in a dogfight. Over Malta even able pilots could be outmanoeuvred by the nimble Italian fighter that was, on the other hand, slower and armed only with the "classical" couple of Breda-SAFAT 12.7 mm machine guns.

Another Italian fighter, the Reggiane Re.2005, although built in limited numbers, was occasionally encountered by Spitfires over Sicily. W.G.G. Duncan Smith considered: "The Re 2005 'Sagittario' was a potent aircraft. Having had a dog-fight with one of them, I am convinced we would have been hard pressed to cope in our Spitfires operationally, if the Italians or Germans had had a few squadrons equipped with these aircraft at the beginning of the Sicily campaign or in operations from Malta."

== Italian Cobelligerent Air Force ==
On 17 August 1944, after training at Canne airfield, 12 kilometres (7.5 mi) south of Termoli, an RAF Squadron with Yugoslavian pilots provided 53 Spitfire Vs to the Italian Co-Belligerent Air Force. Only 33 would be used in front service with 20° Gruppo of 51° Stormo becoming the first Italian unit to receive the Spitfire, with its first offensive mission on 23 October, over Albania. From then on, Italian Spitfire missions included escorting transport aircraft, reconnaissance flights and ground attacks. By 31 December 1944 there were 17 Spitfires Vs on charge (a total of 40 Mk Vs were eventually acquired). Two Spitfire Vs of 20° Gruppo flew the Regia Aeronautica's last wartime mission on 5 May 1945, a visual reconnaissance of Zagabria.

By 8 May, 13 Spitfires (eight of them operational) were at Canne airport with 356a and 360a Squadriglia of 20° Gruppo. Two more Spitfires were located at Frosinone airport, at Scuola Addestramento Bombardamento e Caccia.

== Spitfires of the USSR ==
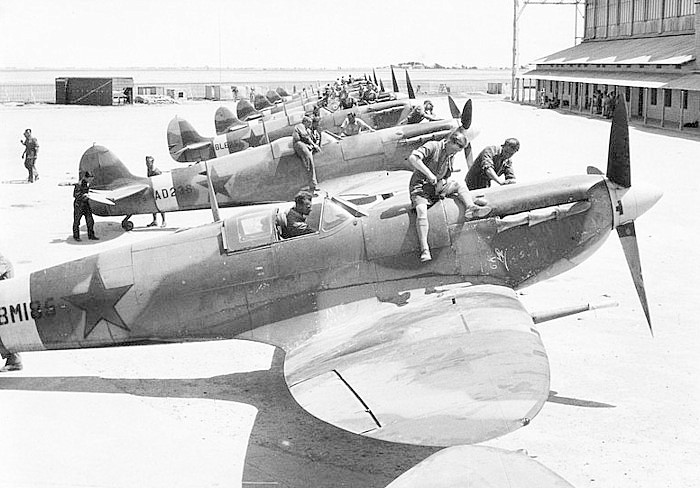
Ex-RAF Spitfire Vbs being prepared for delivery to the USSR at Abadan, Iran in early 1943. The two Spitfires in the foreground had already seen extensive RAF service.

In early October 1942, Josef V. Stalin wrote to Sir Winston Churchill, requesting the urgent delivery of Spitfires. Churchill agreed to send a batch of 150 Supermarine fighters, along with spares, equivalent to an additional 50 aircraft. Deliveries of Spitfire VBs to USSR started in the spring of 1943. These were the first official Spitfire export. Most of these Mk Vbs had already seen extensive service with the RAF. One of the first units to receive the Spitfire was the 36th Fighter Aviation Regiment, which was part of the Voyenno-Vozdushnyye Sily or VVS. Soviet pilots were very disappointed by the performance of the Spitfire V; they preferred, and made better use of, the Bell P-39 Airacobra. (Note: In some cases other VVS pilots mistook the Spitfires for Bf 109s.)

According to Senior Lieutenant Anatoli Ivanov "We knew that at the time the English had a better fighter, the Spitfire IX, and the word was that it was good. The aircraft our Allies had presented to us, however, were of a much older version ... and these Spitfires had taken some knocks before they were repaired and transferred to us ... Its speed was not much greater than that of the I-16 ... The Soviet fighters designed by Lavochkin and Yakovlev had significantly better performance". (Note: More details about Spitfires operating with the 5th GIAP can be found on the website Spitfires over the Kuban Retrieved: 8 February 2008.)

In the Soviet "open press" the trend of the times was that foreign-built items were never to be shown as better than home-built products.

But usually Soviet pilots agreed that the Spitfire Mk VB was easy to fly and that it was a magnificent compromise between manoeuvrability and stability. In this respect, the British fighter was superior to the Yak-1, to say nothing of the LaGG-3 and MiG-3. Other fighters could, however, outdive the British fighter, so a dive in order to break away when under attack – a tactic that worked well with other types – could be fatal on the Spitfire, because it picked up speed slowly due to the low wing loading. The armament was superior to that of any Soviet fighter and was only surpassed later by that of the Yak-9T. It is clear issues experienced were accepted as USSR did not object to receiving more Spitfires as 1200 Mk. IX were received.

However, the Spitfire did have serious defects for the rough conditions of Soviet operations. Because of the narrow track the undercarriage was ill-suited to Soviet grass airfields. The aircraft could start swaying dangerously while taxiing over uneven ground, and the wingtip could easily touch the ground. Moreover, the Spitfire had a centre of gravity positioned well forward and could easily stand on its nose while manoeuvering on soft or uneven ground; the flight manual expressly forbade taxiing in such conditions without a man sitting astride the tail for balance. Moreover, the widely spaced wing guns proved unfamiliar to Soviet pilots, as on Soviet fighters the armament was usually grouped around the engine. Considering this and Soviet tactics those who flew in combat the Spitfire found that hitting the target at close range or during violent manoeuvres in a dogfight was not easy.

Main operation issues was Soviet pilots and anti-aircraft gunners many times confused the Spitfire silhouette with the one of German Bf 109s, squared wing-tip configuration of Mk. IX Spitfire did not help. By 1943, the VVS was being re-equipped with Lavochkin La-5s and Yakovlev Yak-1s and Yak-9s which were extremely good low-to-medium-altitude fighters and, with their rugged construction and wide-track undercarriages, were well suited to operating from the frontline airfields. Spitfire IX became irreplaceable in a role of a high-altitude interceptor of air defence.

As far as can be ascertained the total numbers of Spitfire which were delivered are as follows:

- Vb: = 143
- PR IV: = 9 (number not confirmed)
- LF IX: = 1183
- HF XI: = 2
- LF XVI: = 9

== French Air Force Spitfires ==
In September 1938 two French Air Force pilots were allowed to fly a Spitfire Mk.I after France expressed official interest in purchasing a manufacturing licence. Air Ministry was reluctant to give up any of its Spitfires, but it eventually agreed to supply three examples to the French Air Force. This was later reduced to one example, and the 251st production aircraft was completed as 01 for the French Air Force and was supplied with a spare Merlin Ill. It made its maiden flight on 25 May 1939, going to France on 18 July. It was the only Spitfire ever built directly for an export customer, all other deliveries being ex-RAF aircraft modified for foreign service.

When the German forces invaded France the French Spitfire was at Orleans and was to have been burnt to stop it falling into enemy hands.

On 7 November 1941 No 340 Squadron was the first Spitfire unit to be formed in Free France Air Force. More squadrons were later formed.

The Free French and the Vichy French air force units in North Africa were merged in January 1943 and three former Vichy Squadrons re-equipped with Spitfires. In the end seven French Spitfire squadrons fought in western Europe and the Mediterranean.

== Luftwaffe Spitfires ==
There is evidence that the Luftwaffe used captured Spitfires to test and for operational training duties. Supermarine Spitfire in many versions were present in the Luftwaffe, making the largest fleet of captured aircraft in Germany. All Spitfires were recovered, if possible, after crash landing and dismantled for spare parts for the few flyable aircraft or sent to air depots (many almost intact). Its use in combat is not recorded.

German ace Heinz Bäer said "Of course the quality of the Spitfire needs no elaboration. They shot me down once and caused me at least six forced landings". Fellow ace Gunther Rall, who test flew captured versions of practically all of the top Allied fighters, stated that he preferred the Spitfire. This was a common sentiment among Luftwaffe fighter pilots, who regarded the Spitfire as their most dangerous foe. Some of these aircraft were used in the so-called Zirkus Rosarius – 2.Staffel Versuchsverband Oberkommando der Luftwaffe. Aircraft in this unit were used for combat training and for develop new dogfight techniques. Spitfires used in Zirkus Rosarius were reequipped with R/T FuG 7 or FuG 7a for better communication between instructor and pupil. At least one Spitfire MK V was re-engined with a DB-601 in the fall of 1942.

Germans captured many Spitfires that were flyable after few repairs. In the following cases it is documented they were used by Luftwaffe:

- Spitfire Mk IA, X4260, of No. 603 squadron was shot down on 16 May 1940 south of Calais, it was later tested by Fritz Wendel.
- Spitfire PR IB, P9331. On 7 June 1940 was forced to land at Reims/Champagne aerodrome during an abortive mission to photograph the railway line at Maastricht-Liege. This was the first PR Spitfire captured.
- Spitfire Mk IA, N3277, of No.234 Sqn force-landed near Cherbourg 15 August 1940. It was repaired, and tested at Rechlin, marked 5+2. Later it was tested by Luftwaffe Fighter units in France, being the latest JG.26 at Orleans-Bricy, in March 1943.
- Spitfire Mk IA, P9317, of No.222 Sqn force-landed at Le Touquet airfield on 1 June 1940. It was flown as "G-X" in a propaganda film, based in Kolberg.
- Spitfire PR IA, P9331, of No.212 Sqn, force-landed near Reims on 7 June 1940. It was repaired and flown to Rechlin, marked 2+ I.
- Spitfire Mk IA, K9791, failed to return from a sortie over the Ruhr on 17 August 1940. The captured Spitfire was displayed with other Allied equipment at the Victory in the West exhibition in Vienna towards the end of 1940.
- Spitfire Mk IA, X4260, of No. 603 Sqn force-landed near Calais on 6 September 1940. It was repaired and tested by 2/JG.54. later flown to Messerschmitt factory and marked 4+5.
- Spitfire PR C, X4385, of No.l PRU force-landed at Deelen airfield, Netherlands on 22 September 1941. It was repaired and flown to Rechlin.
- Spitfire Mk IA, marked 5+2, was used for comparison flying tests against Bf 109s and Fw 190s of 5/JG.2 in October 1942. Another Spitfire was used by 5/JG.2 in April 1943, marked 3+9.
- Spitfire Mk Vb, EN830, of No.131 Sqn force-landed on Jersey Island on 18 November 1942. It was flown to Messerschmitt factory where 24-volt electrical system and DB605A engine were installed. It was marked CJ+ZY. The aircraft flew comparison trials with a Bf 109G in 1943. Later, a DB601A engine was installed.
- Spitfire PR.X1, EN685, of No.542 Sqn force-landed on 13 May 1944 in Germany. It was repaired and joined Zirkus Rosarius, marked T9+EK.
- Spitfire LF 1XC, MK698, of No.412 Sqn force-landed near Wachtendonk (Krefeld) on 5 December 1944. It joined Zirkus Rosarius.
- Supermarine Spitfire PR XI MB945, T9+BB. Saw service with Versuchsverband Ob.d.L.

== Asia and the Pacific ==
In the Far East, the Spitfire found an adversary in the A6M "Zero" long-range fighter that, like most Japanese fighters, excelled in manoeuvrability. Although not as fast as the Spitfire, the Zero could out-turn the Spitfire could sustain a climb at a very steep angle, and could stay in the air for three times as long. To fight the Zero, Spitfire pilots had to adopt a "slash and run" policy and use their superior speed and diving superiority to fight, and avoid classic dogfights.

=== South West Pacific ===
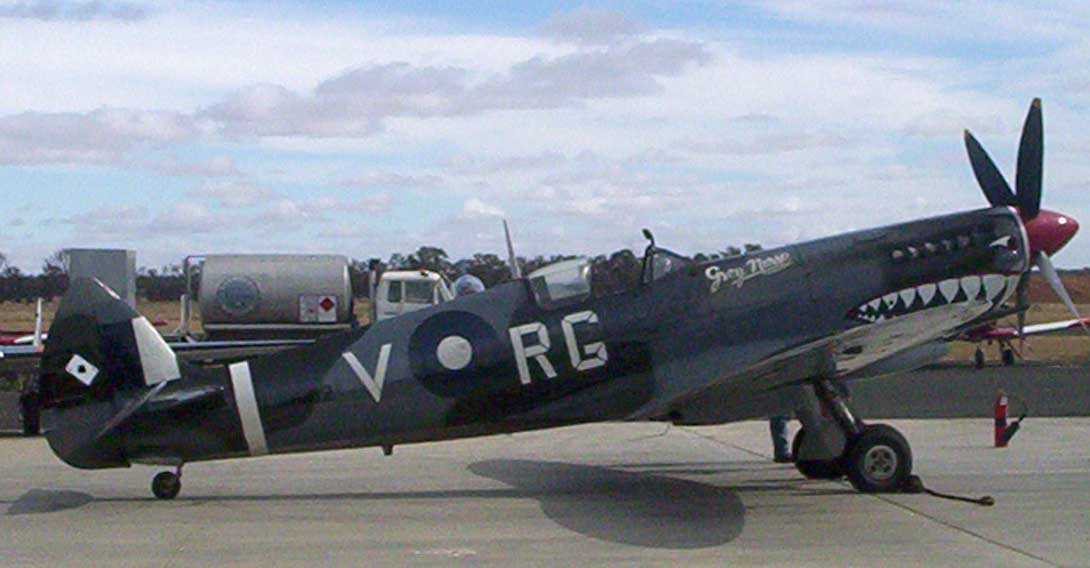
Supermarine Spitfire VIII in the markings of No. 457 Squadron RAAF

The Royal Australian Air Force, the Royal Indian Air Force and the RAF also used Spitfires against Japanese forces in the Pacific theatre. The first Spitfires in the Far East were two photo-reconnaissance (PR IV) aircraft which operated from airfields in India from October 1942.

Japanese air raids on Northern Australia hastened the formation in late 1942 of No. 1 Wing RAAF, comprising No. 54 Squadron RAF, No. 452 Squadron RAAF and No. 457 Squadron RAAF, under the command of Wing Commander Clive Caldwell, flying the Spitfire Vc(trop). The wing arrived at Darwin in February 1943, and saw constant action until September. The Mk Vc versions received by the RAAF proved unreliable and, initially at least, had a relatively high loss rate. This was due to several factors, including pilot inexperience, engine over-speed due to the loss of oil from the propeller speed reduction unit (a problem resolved by the use of a heavier grade of oil), and the practice of draining glycol coolant before shipment, resulting in internal corrosion of the Merlin engines.

Another factor in the initial high attrition rate was the relatively short endurance of the Spitfire: most of the sorties were, as a matter of course, flown over the wide expanse of ocean between Australia, New Guinea and Timor. Even when fitted with drop tanks the Spitfires could not afford to fly too far from base without the danger of running out of fuel over water. As a result, when an incoming raid was detected, the Spitfires were forced to climb as fast as possible in an attempt to get into a favourable position. In the prevailing hot, humid climate this meant that the Merlin engines were often overheating even before combat was joined. The Spitfires were fitted with the Vokes tropical filters which reduced performance: in an attempt to increase performance the filters on several Spitfires were removed and replaced by the standard non-tropicalised air intake and lower engine cowlings which had been manufactured by the base workshops. The experiment proved to be a failure and the Spitfires were quickly refitted with the tropical filters.

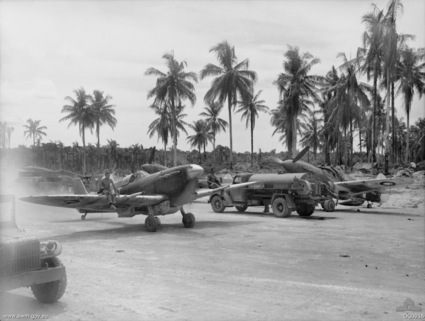
Two No. 79 Squadron RAAF Spitfire VCs and ground crew in April 1944

Many of the Australian and British airmen who flew in 1 Wing were experienced combat veterans, some of whom who had flown P-40s with the Desert Air Force in North Africa, while others had flown Spitfires over Europe. They were used to being able to outmanoeuvre opposing fighters and were shocked to discover that the Zeros they were now flying against were able to outmanoeuvre the Spitfire. Several Spitfires were lost before the pilots learned not to attempt to get into a turning dogfight with the agile Japanese fighters. In spite of these problems the Spitfires were reasonably successful and at times were able to catch the Mitsubishi Ki-46 reconnaissance aircraft which had flown fast enough and high enough to evade interception.

The first of 410 Spitfire Mk VIIIs started replacing the Mk Vcs from October 1943, although, in the event, they were to see very limited air-to-air combat. By mid-1943 the heavy losses imposed on the Japanese Navy in the Solomon Islands campaign and in New Guinea meant that the JNAF could not keep up its attacks on northern Australia. Other units equipped with the Spitfires in the South West Pacific Area included No. 79 Squadron RAAF, No. 85 Squadron RAAF, No. 548 Squadron RAF and No. 549 Squadron RAF.

Politics also played a part; the supreme commander of the South-West Pacific theatre Douglas MacArthur did not want Australians or any other non-Americans to share in his triumphant return to the Philippines. As a result of this, RAAF Spitfire Vs and VIIIs were increasingly used in the fighter-bomber role in mopping-up operations against the large pockets of Japanese forces still remaining in New Guinea, and some Australian based units did not get to see any combat at all. The Australian pilots regarded the situation as intolerable and saw this as a waste of effort and lives, especially as many of them were experienced and battle-hardened. By the end of the Pacific war No. 80 (Fighter) Wing was based on the Morotai Island in the Halmaheras Group assisting Australian ground troops in Borneo. It was here that the so-called Morotai Mutiny took place.

=== India-Burma ===
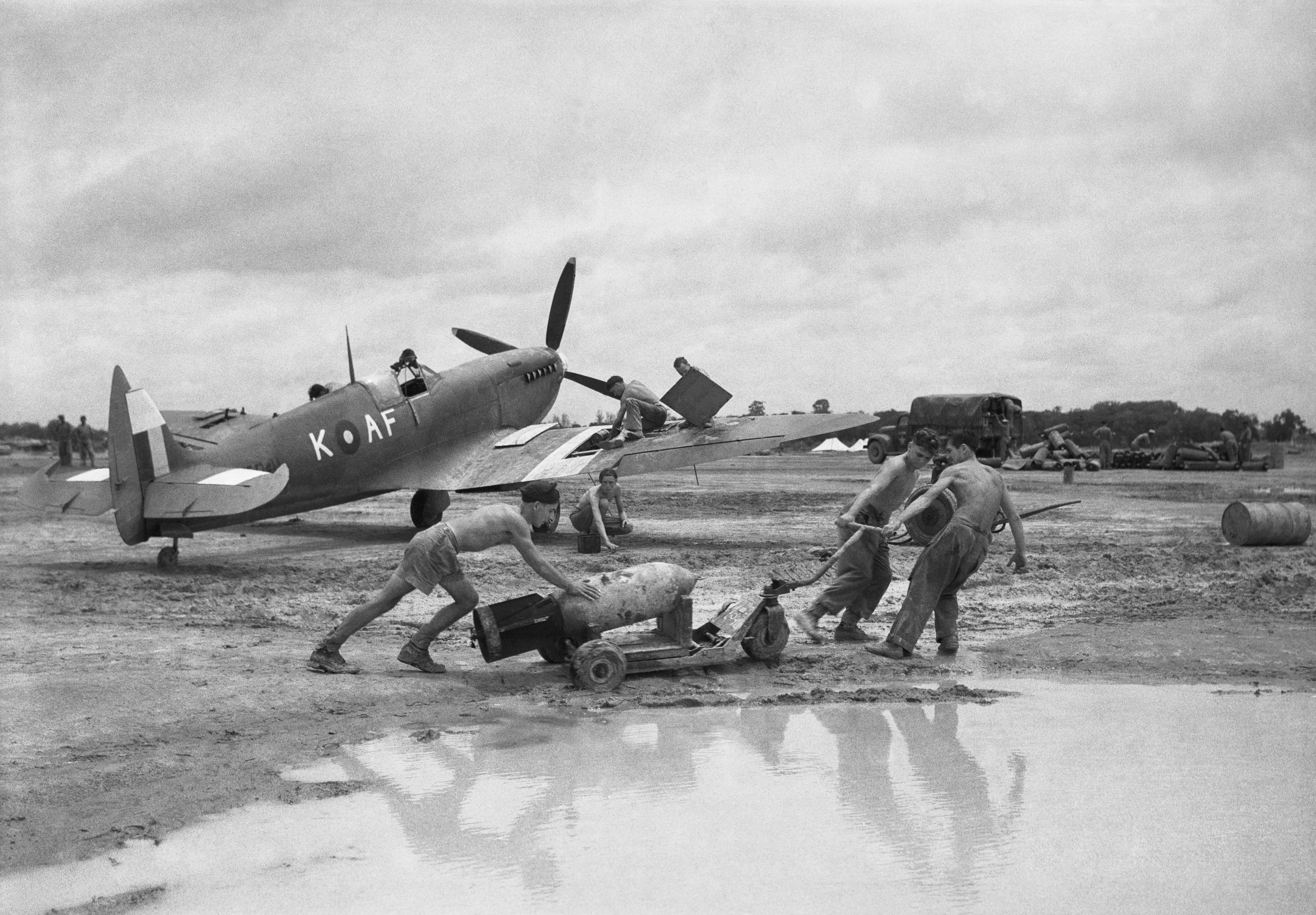
A Spitfire Mk. VIII of No. 607 Squadron RAF being prepared for a sortie at Mingaladon Airfield in Burma in August 1945

In the South East Asian theatre, the first Spitfire Vcs reached three squadrons on the India-Burma front in November 1943. Spitfire pilots met Japanese for the first time on Boxing Day, 1943. A pair of Spitfires piloted by Flying Officer Geoffrey William Andrews and Flight Sergeant Harry B. Chatfield attacked a formation of Japanese planes over Chittagong. Andrews destroyed a fighter and a bomber, damaging a second, while Chatfield shot down another two. On the last day of 1943, Royal Australian Air Force Spitfires destroyed eleven Japanese bombers and three fighters. Churchill complimented the Australian Squadron for their "brilliant exploit".

These aircraft were replaced by the first Mk VIIIs, beginning in February 1944. In late February, they played a major part in thwarting the Japanese Ha-Go offensive, an attack intended to isolate and destroy British Indian divisions in the Arakan Province of Burma. The Allies intended that transport aircraft (particularly the C-47) would drop supplies to surrounded formations, but in the early stages of the Japanese attack, large numbers of Imperial Japanese Army Air Force (IJAAF) fighter aircraft flying from the airfield on Akyab Island forced the first aerial resupply missions to turn back. Three squadrons of Spitfires operating from new airfields around Chittagong gained air superiority over the battlefield after days of battling with Ki-43 "Oscars" and Ki-44 "Tojos". Sixty-five Japanese aircraft were claimed shot down or damaged for the loss of three Spitfires. The Allies were able to parachute supplies to the isolated forward units and the Japanese offensive was defeated with heavy losses.

Spitfires ensured that the Allies gained and held air superiority during the battles of Kohima and Imphal from early to mid 1944, in which the Japanese attempt to destroy the British Fourteenth Army and invade India was also defeated. By 1945, when the Allies launched offensives into Burma, the Japanese were unable to challenge the Allies' air supremacy. Spitfires took part in the last major pitched battle of the war involving the Western allies – No. 607 Squadron and No. 273 Squadron flying the MKVIII armed with 500 pound bombs helped destroy a Japanese breakout attempt at the Sittang Bend in July and early August 1945.

== Post-war service ==
Following the Second World War, the Spitfire remained in use with many air forces around the world. The main foreign air force to use Spitfire was France's Armée de l'Air that ordered more than 500 Supermarine fighters, Mark V, VIII, IX, and XVI variants. Other main users were Dutch Air Force, which received 76 Mark IX; Turkey, with 273; Greece, with 242. The Belgian Air Force received 134 Mark XIV plus 69 Mark IX and XVI. The Indian Air force received 159 Spitfires and the Aeronautica Italiana, 140 Mk IXs. The Southern Rhodesian Air Force received 22 Spitfire XXIIs from surplus RAF stocks in 1951.

=== Europe ===
Soon after the end of the Second World War, the Swedish Air Force equipped a photo-reconnaissance wing, F 11 in Nyköping (just south of Stockholm), with 50 Mk XIXs, designated S 31. Several S 31 photographic missions in the late 1940s entailed flagrant violations of Soviet and, at least once, Finnish airspace in order to document activities at the air and naval installations in the Baltic and Kola regions. At that time, no Soviet fighter was able to reach the operational altitude of the S 31. No Swedish aircraft were lost during those clandestine operations. However, by the early 1950s, Soviet air defences had become so effective that such practices had to cease. The S 31s were replaced by jet-powered SAAB S 29Cs in the mid-1950s.

The Norwegian Air Force also used Spitfires for photo-reconnaissance in the late 1940s. but it also received 71 Mark IXs as well.

In the Greek Civil War, Spitfires played a major role, being flown by the RAF and SAAF during October–December 1944, and by the Hellenic Air Force that received 242 Supermarine aircraft from 1946 to the end of the war in August 1949.

On 9 February 1948 Bulgarian units shotdown two Turkish Air Force Supermarine Spitfire LF Mk IX which were trespassed Bulgarian airspace in near of Sozopol.

Of the 77 Mk IXs sold to Czechoslovakia in 1945, and flown there until 1951, a large number had been sold to Israel in 1948–49.

=== Italy ===
After the Second World War, eight flyable Italian Air Force Mk Vs were supplemented by 145 Mk IXs (obtained in two batches of 60 and 85 aircraft). The Spitfire went into service with 51° and 5° Stormo (wing) flying reconnaissance missions over the Balkans as well as acting in cooperation with the Italian Army and providing a defensive force. Well liked by pilots, the Spitfires were involved in several post-war air races and trophy competitions including the Zerbinati Trophy. Italian P-51s and Spitfires were entered in the handicap race with P-51s penalised by a minute for speed, and Spitfires penalised a similar amount in climb rate. The Spitfire Mk IX remained in service until 1950–1952 when 30 survivors were supplied to the Israeli Air Force (HHA). Eventually, these ex-Italian aircraft were sent to Burma in 1954–55. Today, one ex-Italian Air Force Spitfire Mk IX, MM4084, is on display at Vigna di Valle, Rome.

=== Middle East ===
Spitfires last saw air-to air combat during the 1948 Arab-Israeli War, when, in a strange twist, Israeli Air Force (IAF) Spitfires flown by former RAF pilots such as Ezer Weizman engaged Egyptian Spitfires and Royal Air Force Spitfires, the only recorded "Spitfire vs Spitfire" combats. A total of 59 Spitfire Mk IXs had been purchased by Israel in a controversial overseas transaction from Czechoslovakia, while 37 Mk IXs had been purchased by Egypt from retired RAF stocks.

On 22 May 1948, over Israel, a unique incident took place in the Spitfire's operational history when three Spitfire users came into conflict. On this date, five Egyptian Mk IXs attacked, by mistake, the RAF base at Ramat David, shared by 32 and 208 Squadrons. They destroyed a number of Mk XVIIIs on the ground, but the surviving Spitfires took off and shot down four of the Egyptian aircraft. One of the RAF pilots was Geoff Cooper who was, in turn, later in the year shot down by the American pilot Chalmers Goodlin, flying an Israeli Mk IX. On 21 October, IAF Spitfires shot down one Egyptian Spitfire and damaged two others. During this combat Jack Doyle, a Canadian pilot on the IAF's 101 Squadron, claimed the first ever aerial victory by the IAF.

In the last aerial combat of the war, on 7 January 1949, two IAF Spitfires attacked four RAF Mk XVIII Spitfires of 208 Squadron after an earlier flight of RAF Spitfires had allegedly infringed Israel's southern border. The IAF claimed three Mk XVIIIs destroyed, with another downed by ground fire. Later in the day, a Hawker Tempest Mk V was also shot down and the pilot killed. Two RAF pilots had been killed, one badly injured and with another two taken as a POW by the Israelis. The injured RAF pilot was given good medical treatment, but even so this combat caused an attitude of "stunned dismay" in the ranks of the RAF and was the cause of some tension between the Israeli forces and the RAF pilots until the war officially ended in July 1949.

=== South Asia ===
Spitfires were employed by the Indian Air Force in the 1947 Indo-Pakistan War against invading tribals in Kashmir. They remained in service with India until 1957.

Of the Spitfire Mk IXs that Israeli bought from Czechoslovakia in 1948–49, about 30 were purchased by the Union of Burma Air Force in 1954–55, where they joined 20 Seafire XVs, bought in 1952 direct from Vickers-Armstrong, and three Mk XVIIIs purchased from Air Command South-East Asia. They were used on counter-insurgency missions against separatist forces, to strafe Communist positions in the north of the country as civil war replaced the struggle between British and Japanese. The accident rate amongst local Spitfire pilots was exceptionally high. The aircraft remained in service until at least 1954.

=== Indochina war ===
French Armée de l'Air and Aéronavale received in Indochina a squadron of Spitfire Mk. VIIIs when RAF left Tan Son Nhut in 1946. They were supplemented by 12 Spitfire LF.IXs sent from Europe in 1947. At the beginning of the Indochina War the French possessed approximately sixty Spitfires that performed poorly in the close-support role and its availability was generally low.

=== Malayan Emergency: last offensive ===
RAF Spitfires based in the Far East saw action during the Malayan Emergency. When Malayan Communist Party (MCP) soldiers killed three British rubber-planters on 16 June 1948 at Sungai Siput, Perak, Great Britain declared a state of emergency. On 6 July, 81 Squadron Spitfire Mk XVIIIs attacked an MCP camp with rockets. The most intense attacks on enemy targets were made in late 1949; on 21 October, RAF Spitfires and Seafires from 800 RNAS flew 62 sorties. The 16 Spitfires from the two squadrons based in Singapore flew some 1,800 missions against Communist positions. On 1 January 1951 the last offensive sortie made by RAF Spitfires was flown by a flight of four 60 Squadron Mk XVIIIs, led by Grp Capt Wilfrid Duncan Smith, in a strike against a target near Kota Tinggi.

=== Private ===
One notable variant was the privately owned LV-NMZ (Argentine registration). This was a PR XI, PL-972, purchased by James Elwyn Storey and his brother Jack to undertake aerial photography for the Argentine government. Both served in the RAF during the Second World War. James flew his Spitfire from Bournemouth on the south coast of England to Gibraltar, on to Dakar in Senegal, from Dakar to Natal in Brazil, then Rio de Janeiro, Porto Alegre and finally Buenos Aires. Using external wing tanks and a belly ferry tank, he established two records: one for the heaviest fuel load ever carried by a Spitfire and one for the longest flight for a Spitfire, the Dakar to Natal leg of approximately 1,870 miles.

There are currently some 50 Spitfires flying today, a number that waxes and wanes as one aircraft is restored to airworthy condition and another crashes or retires for further restoration. A growing number of companies, based in England, France, Australia, Canada and the United States, manufacture replica Spitfires with engines of 650 hp or Chevrolets V-8 engines, or Japanese V-6s. There are even full-scale machines available, powered by 1,200 hp Allison V-12 offering considerable performance.

Some air forces retained Spitfires in service well into the 1960s.

== See also ==
- Military history of the Soviet Union
- Military history of the United Kingdom during World War II
