= No. 132 Squadron RAF =

Defunct flying squadron of the Royal Air Force

No. 132 (City of Bombay) Squadron RAF
- Active: 1 Mar 1918 – 23 Dec 1918; 7 Jul 1941 – 15 April 1946
- Country: United Kingdom
- Branch: Royal Air Force
- Nickname: City of Bombay
- Mottos: Latin: Cave leopardum ("Beware the leopard")

Insignia
- Squadron Badge heraldry: A leopard rampant.
- Squadron Codes: FF (Jul 1941 – Apr 1946)

No. 132 (City of Bombay) Squadron RAF was a Royal Air Force Squadron formed to be a bomber unit in World War I and reformed as a fighter unit in World War II.

== History ==
=== Formation and World War I ===
No. 132 Squadron Royal Flying Corps was formed on 1 March 1918 and became a unit of the Royal Air Force a month later, but it disbanded on 23 December 1918 without becoming operational.

=== Reformation in World War II ===
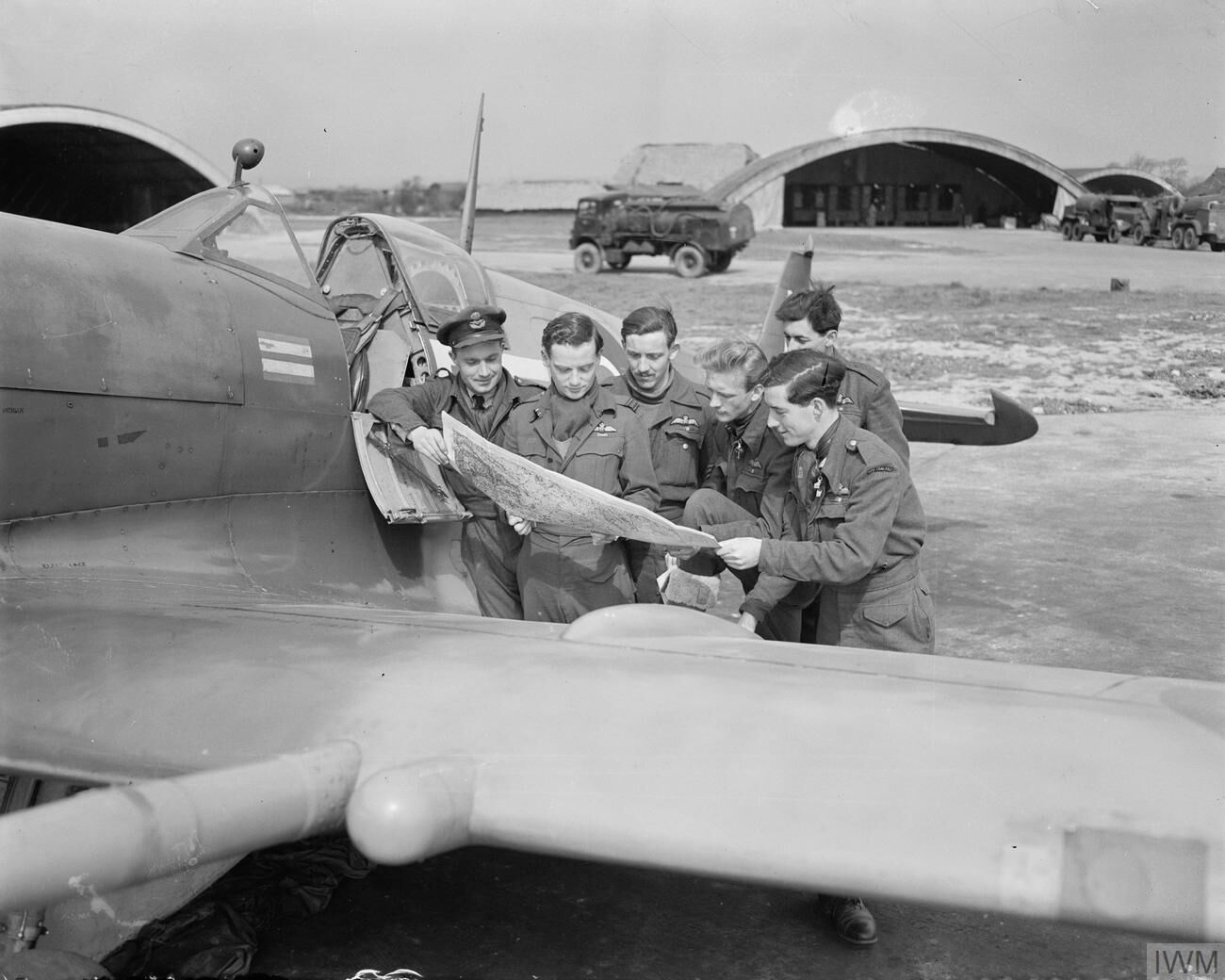
Squadron Leader Alan Page, with map, briefing pilots of No. 132 Squadron at Ford, 27 April 1944

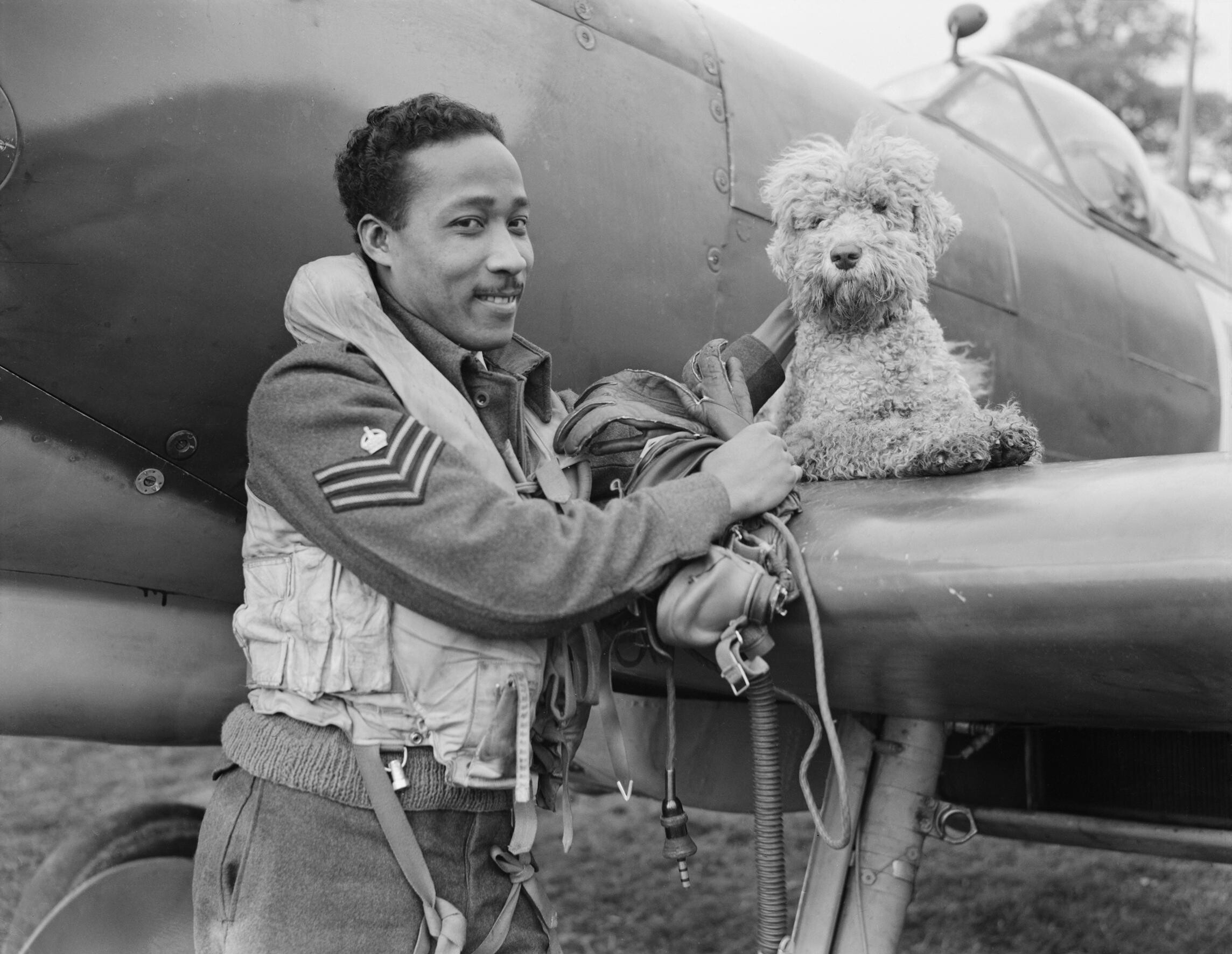
Flight Sergeant James Hyde, a fighter pilot serving with No. 132 Squadron, pictured by a Supermarine Spitfire with 'Dingo', the squadron commander's pet dog, c. 1944

The squadron reformed in 1941 as a fighter unit equipped with Spitfires and then provided air defence from Peterhead, Scotland, and Southern England. It then moved to Normandy after the D-Day landings. It returned to England in September 1944 before moving to Vavuniya, Ceylon, in January 1945. It was then based in Hong Kong, and was disbanded on 15 April 1946. The Squadron was a mixed RAF squadron meaning its members were from all over the world: The Caribbean, Poland, Canada, New Zealand etc.

== Aircraft operated ==
Aircraft operated by No. 132 Squadron RAF
From	To	Aircraft	Variant
Jul 1941	Nov 1941	Supermarine Spitfire	I
Sep 1941	Apr 1942	Supermarine Spitfire	IIB
Mar 1942	Jun 1943	Supermarine Spitfire	VB
May 1943	Jun 1943	Supermarine Spitfire	VC
Jun 1943	Oct 1943	Supermarine Spitfire	VB
Sep 1943	Jan 1944	Supermarine Spitfire	IXB
Jan 1944	Mar 1944	Supermarine Spitfire	VB
Jan 1944	Mar 1944	Supermarine Spitfire	VI
Mar 1944	Jul 1944	Supermarine Spitfire	IXB
Jun 1944	Sep 1944	Supermarine Spitfire	IXE
Sep 1944	Nov 1944	Supermarine Spitfire	IXB
Jan 1945	May 1945	Supermarine Spitfire	VIII
May 1945	Apr 1946	Supermarine Spitfire	XIV

== Combat ==
=== Pilots ===
132 Squadron had a number of prestigious pilots, many of whom received the Distinguished Flying Cross.

The commanding officers for the Squadron were: J.R Ritchie, F.F Colloredo-Mansfield, A.G Page, and K.L Charney.

Flight Commanders in the Squadron were: D. Fopp, G. StClair, B.Rein, H.L. Smith, H.E Walmsley, A.E Tomblin, R.L.F Day, J.D Carpenter, A. Hvinden, T. Johnson, M. Graham, H.C Prudman, and J.M Maynyard.

DFCs were awarded to: F.F Colloredo-Mansfield, H.E Walmsley, A.E Tomblin, A.G Page, D.J Hawkings, R.L.F Day, M. Graham, K.L Charney, and H.C Prudman.

A single Distinguished Flying Medal was awarded to F. Campbell.

Of the 130 pilots who served on the Squadron, 14 lost their lives and 4 went missing with unknown fates.

=== Combat roles ===
The Sqn started as a fighter unit before transitioning to a Fighter-Bomber role to support the D-Day landings. They were the first Spitfire Sqn to carry a bomb load of 1000lbs per aircraft and dropped 110 tons of bombs during the course of the war. The Sqn claimed 29 victories over enemy aircraft with a further 15 probable destroyed. They also destroyed 253 transport ground vehicles, and 15 midget submarines - "...another of the Flight Commanders who was Norwegian by the name of Hvinden spotted these whilst on a routine patrol on the Normandy Beaches. They were obviously trying to attack our shipping forces lying off the beaches, but unfortunately for them 132 Squadron arrived on the scene" - A.G. Page.
