= Harold Walmsley =

British WWII flying ace (1922–2021)

- Born: 14 December 1922; Preston, Lancashire, England
- Died: 2 April 2021 (aged 98)
- Military career
- Allegiance: United Kingdom
- Branch: Royal Air Force
- Rank: Group Captain
- Units: No. 611 Squadron; No. 132 Squadron; No. 130 Squadron
- Commands: No. 350 (Belgian) Squadron; No. 80 Squadron; No. 67 Squadron
- Conflicts: Second World War: Western Allied invasion of Germany; Cold War
- Awards: Distinguished Flying Cross & Bar; Croix de Guerre (Belgium)

Harold Walmsley, DFC & Bar (14 December 1922 – 2 April 2021) was a British officer who served in the Royal Air Force (RAF) during the Second World War as well as the Cold War. A flying ace of the Second World War, he was credited with having destroyed at least eleven German aircraft.

Born in Preston, Walmsley joined the RAF in 1940 and upon completion of his flying training was posted to No. 611 Squadron. Flying the Supermarine Spitfire fighter, he claimed his first aerial victories in early 1943 on operations to German-occupied Europe and more followed the next year while serving with Nos. 132 and 130 Squadrons. His successes saw him awarded the Distinguished Flying Cross (DFC). In late March 1945 he was appointed commander of No. 350 Squadron, which was operating over central Germany. He destroyed a number of aircraft in the final weeks of the war in Europe, for which he was awarded a Bar to his DFC.

Granted a permanent commission in the RAF after the war, Walmsley held a series of squadron commands. His later service career included staff postings at the Air Ministry and the Ministry of Defence and he left the RAF as a group captain in 1971. In civilian life, he held senior management positions at the British Defence Consortium in Saudi Arabia and Airwork in Oman until his retirement in 1975. He died in 2021 at the age of 98, one of the last surviving Spitfire flying aces of the Second World War.

== Early life ==
Harold Walmsley was born on 14 December 1922 in Preston, England. He was working as a metallurgical laboratory assistant when he joined the Royal Air Force (RAF) in December 1940, when he was 18 years old.

== Second World War ==
Walmsley's flying training was deferred for a time but in due course he was sent to Rhodesia, where he gained his wings. He returned to England in June 1942 for the final stages of his training at No. 61 Operational Training Unit (OTU). Holding the rank of sergeant pilot, he was posted to No. 611 Squadron three months later. Based at Biggin Hill, this unit operated the Supermarine Spitfire Mk. IX fighter on offensive operations to German-occupied Europe. Commissioned as a pilot officer on 4 January 1943, Walmsley made his first claim for an aerial victory five days later; this was for a Focke Wulf Fw 190 fighter probably destroyed near Abbeville.

=== Operations over France ===
On 17 January, also near Abbeville, Walmsley damaged a Focke-Wulf Fw 189 observation aircraft. A Fw 190 was damaged by Walmsley near Dungeness on 9 April, and he repeated the feat on 16 May, damaging a Fw 190 near Morlaix. Promoted to flying officer at the start of July, he destroyed a Messerschmitt Bf 109 fighter to the west of Amsterdam on 25 July. The same month, No. 611 Squadron moved to Matlaske where it began converting to the Spitfire Mk. LF. Vb fighter in preparation for low-level operations.

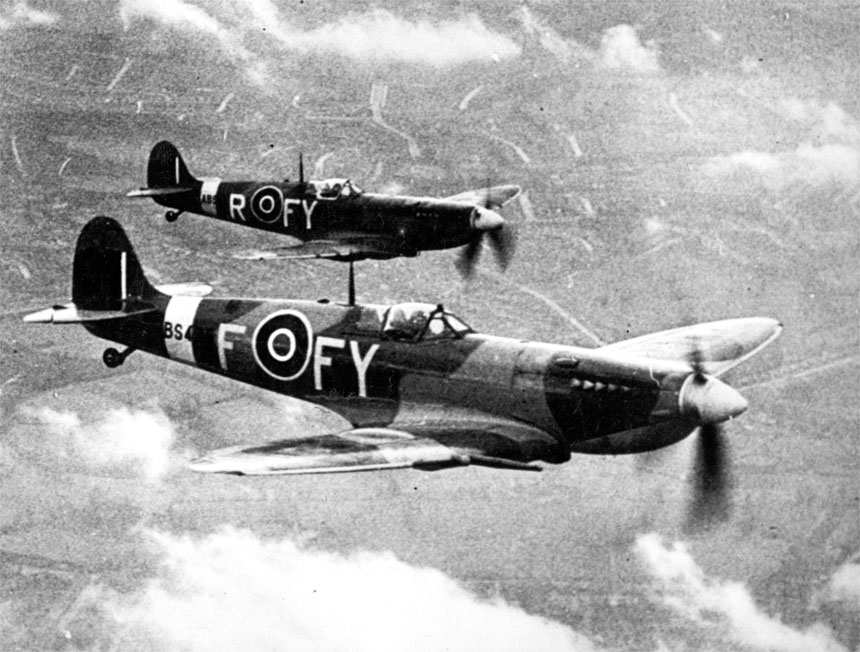
Supermarine Spitfires of No. 611 Squadron, 1943

In August Walmsley was posted to No. 132 Squadron to become one of its flight commanders. His new unit was commanded by Squadron Leader F. Colleredo-Mansfeld, Walmsley's former flight commander at No. 611 Squadron. Tasked with carrying out offensive sweeps and escort missions to France with its Spitfires, the intensity of operations increased as the year progressed. Walmsley damaged a Fw 190 near Courtrai on 21 December. In the New Year, on 7 January, he shot down a Fw 190 to the east of Abbeville. He was taken off operations for a rest in April and was awarded the Distinguished Flying Cross (DFC).

After attending the Central Gunnery School, Walmsley carried out instructing duties with No. 57 OTU at Eshott from May to October. He was then posted to No. 130 Squadron as a flight commander. Based at the Deurne airfield in Belgium, this was on ground attack duties, carrying out sorties with its Spitfire Mk. XIVs to support the Allied ground forces as they advanced into France and Belgium. While carrying on a strafing attack on a train near Münster on 8 December, Walmsley's section was intercepted by a section of Bf 109s. In the resulting engagement he shot down a Bf 109. During a sortie later in the month, he was shot down by friendly fire while flying over American lines. Taking to his parachute, he was caught up in a tree when he landed but with the assistance of locals, he was able to free himself and return to his unit.

=== Operations over Germany ===
Walmsley received a substantive promotion to flight lieutenant in January 1945. Poor weather inhibited the squadron's operations supporting the Allied advance into Germany until spring, at which time aerial engagements with Luftwaffe fighters became more frequent. Walmsley, who was for a time acting commander of the squadron, shot down a Fw 190 near Hamm on 13 March, and this was followed two weeks later by the destruction of another Fw 190, one of four intercepted by his section, to the south of Warendorf. A Junkers Ju 52 transport aircraft was shot down by Walmsley on 13 April over Vechlin and a week later he caught and destroyed two Fieseler Fi 156 Storch light aircraft on an airfield at Vechlin. he shot down a Fw 190 near Oranienburg on 20 April.

On 23 April Walmsley shot down a pair of Messerschmitt Bf 108 trainer aircraft over Parchim airfield. Later that day he was appointed commander of No. 350 Squadron. Based at Celle, this was a unit which was composed largely of Belgian pilots which had evaded the German occupation of their country. At the time Walmsley became commanding officer, it was flying Spitfires in the aerial fighting around Berlin. The day after taking command, he destroyed a Fw 190 at Klienen airfield. This was followed on 25 April by his shooting down of another Fw 190 near Rechlin. His final aerial victory was a share in the destruction of a Fw 190 near Plaver Lake on 26 April. By the time the war ended in Europe, the squadron was based at Fassberg in Germany. His successes were recognised with an award of a Bar to his DFC. The published citation read:

This officer has completed many sorties since being awarded the Distinguished Flying Cross and throughout has set a fine example of determination and devotion to duty. In air fighting, Squadron Leader Walmsley has been responsible for the destruction of 9 enemy aircraft and has also inflicted much damage on enemy transport despite heavy opposition. He has proved a most valuable asset to the squadron.

— London Gazette, No. 37182, 17 July 1945

== Postwar service ==
Walmsley remained in command of No. 350 Squadron, which was part of the British Air Forces of Occupation (BAFO) in Germany, until August. His leadership of the squadron was recognised with the award of the Belgian Croix de guerre. He then took up a staff post at No. 84 Group. From May 1946 to November the following year, he served as commander of No. 80 Squadron. This was another unit of the BAFO, stationed at Wunstorf and equipped with the Hawker Tempest fighter. Granted a permanent commission as a flying officer but with the rank of acting squadron leader for this appointment, he reverted to flight lieutenant for his next posting, a flying instructor's course at the Central Flying School (CFS) at Little Rissington. In May 1948, he returned to No. 611 Squadron, stationed at Woodvale, as its adjutant and one of three full-time RAF officers at the unit. The remainder of its officers were part-time reservists.

Returning to the CFS in March 1950 as an instructor, Walmsley was sent to No. 4 Flying Training School, in Rhodesia, as its chief flying instructor the following year. He was promoted to squadron leader on 1 July 1952. He went to the RAF Staff College in 1954 and, after completing a conversion course on the North American F-86 Sabre fighter, was appointed commander of No. 67 Squadron in April 1955. He served in this role for two years before becoming a wing commander at Tangmere, and oversaw the transfer of responsibility for the station to Signals Command. After a course at the Joint Services College, Walmsley was posted to the Air Ministry. In 1962 he was promoted to group captain and given command of RAF Boulmer, a radar station.

In 1965 Walmsley was sent to Singapore for three years as a planning officer at the RAF headquarters there. Once back in the United Kingdom, he was a staff officer at the Ministry of Defence, where he advised the parliamentarian Denis Healey. He finished his career with the RAF as an instructor at Greenwich, teaching on the Senior Officers' War Course.

== Later life ==
Recruited into the civil aviation industry, Walmsley went to Saudi Arabia as the deputy director of the British Defence Consortium. When his contract ended in 1973, he remained in the Middle East as the general manager of Airwork in Oman; this had the responsibility for servicing the Royal Air Force of Oman which used the BAC Strikemaster light attack aircraft. He retired to Suffolk in 1975, spending much of his leisure time sailing. Walmsley died on 2 April 2021; at the time of his death he was one of the last surviving flying aces of the RAF to have flown a Spitfire. He was survived by his two children, as his wife Jean, who he had married in 1945, had predeceased him.

Walmsley is credited with having shot down eleven aircraft, one of which was shared with another pilot. A further aircraft was probably destroyed and four more damaged. He is also credited with having destroyed two aircraft on the ground.
