= Uhr =

Uhr or UHR may refer to:

== Organizations ==
- Swedish Council for Higher Education (Swedish: Universitets- och högskolerådet, UHR), a Swedish government agency
- The Swatch Group, a Swiss manufacturer of watches and jewellery traded on the SIX Swiss Exchange as UHR

== People ==
- Clive Uhr (1903–1974), Australian radiologist
- John Uhr, Australian political scientist
- Leonard Uhr (1927–2000), American computer scientist
- Marie Louise Uhr (1923–2001), Australian biochemist and feminist
- Martina Uhr (born 1961), German politician
- Wentworth D'Arcy Uhr (1845–1907), Australian Native Police officer and drover

== Places ==
- Hastings Ranch, Pasadena, California, which includes the neighborhood of Upper Hastings Ranch (UHR)

== Science and technology ==
- Wi-Fi 8, an upcoming wireless networking standard dubbed Ultra High Reliability (UHR)

== See also ==
- Ur (disambiguation)
