= List of airports in Darwin =

This is a list of airports in Darwin Northern Territory.

== List of airports ==
The list is sorted by the name of the community served, click the sort buttons in the table header to switch listing order.

Community	Airport name	Type	ICAO	IATA	Coordinates
Marrara	RAAF Base Darwin	Military	YPDN	DRW	12°24′53″S 130°52′36″E
Marrara	Darwin International Airport	Public	YPDN	DRW	12°24′53″S 130°52′36″E
Noonamah	Hughes Airfield	Military			12°41′20″S 131°05′21″E
Noonamah	MKT Airfield	Private			12°36′31″S 131°03′17″E

== Defunct airports ==
Community	Airport name	Type	ICAO	IATA	Coordinates
Darwin	Sattler Airfield	Military			12°36′36″S 131°03′06″E
Noonamah	Strauss Airfield	Military			12°39′32″S 131°04′41″E

== See also ==
- List of airports in the Northern Territory
