= No. 549 Squadron RAF =

1943–1945 British fighter squadron

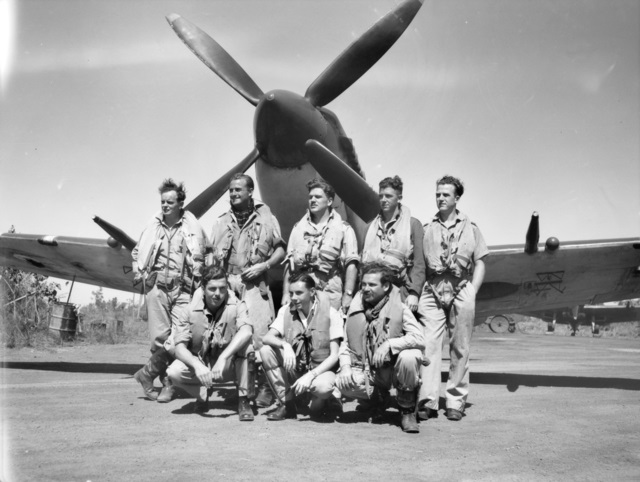
- Some of No. 549 Squadron's pilots and a Spitfire in June 1945 near Darwin, Australia
- Active: 15 Dec 1943 – 31 Oct 1945
- Country: United Kingdom
- Branch: Royal Air Force

Insignia
- Squadron Codes: ZF (Apr 1944 – Oct 1945)

No. 549 Squadron RAF was a fighter squadron of the Royal Air Force (RAF) operating in Australia from 1943 to 1945.

== History ==
The squadron was formed at Lawnton Airfield, Queensland Australia on 15 December 1943, made up of RAF Aircrew and RAAF groundstaff, to provide air defence duties with Spitfires, as the RAAF Kittyhawks were inadequate for interception missions. On 1 January they moved to Petrie Airfield, Strathpine, Queensland. In April 1944 the squadron's Spitfires arrived. May 1944 the unit moved to RAAF Base Amberley, Queensland, while June saw a move to Strauss Airfield, Northern Territory with a detachment at Truscott Airfield, Western Australia. On 5 September 1944 it joined sister unit No. 548 Squadron RAF on a sweep over Selaru Island, 300 miles north of Darwin. In October they went to Parap Airfield (Darwin/Civil), Northern Territory, maintaining their detachment in Truscott. On 27 November they went over Timor. Throughout its life the Squadron was commanded by Sqn Ldr E.P.W. Bocock. The squadron was disbanded, according to some sources, at Parap Airfield, Darwin, on 9 October 1945. However, a more recent source states that disbandment occurred on 31 October, at Melbourne. Afterwards, the RAF personnel returned to the United Kingdom.

== Aircraft operated ==
Aircraft operated by No. 549 Squadron RAF
From	To	Aircraft	Version	Remarks
December 1943	April 1944	CAC Wirraway		For training
December 1943	April 1944	de Havilland Tiger Moth		For training
April 1944	October 1945	Supermarine Spitfire	Mk.VIII	Tropicalised

== Squadron bases ==
Bases and airfields used by No. 549 Squadron RAF
From	To	Base	Remarks
15 December 1943	1 January 1944	Lawnton Airfield, Queensland	
1 January 1944	24 May 1944	Petrie Airfield, Strathpine, Queensland	
24 May 1944	16 June 1944	RAAF Base Amberley, Queensland	Detachment at RAAF Base Townsville, Queensland
16 June 1944	23 October 1944	Strauss Airfield, Northern Territory	Detachment at Truscott Airfield, Western Australia
23 October 1944	23 September 1945	Parap Airfield (Darwin/Civil), Darwin, Northern Territory	Detachment at Truscott Airfield, Western Australia
23 September 1945	31 October 1945	RAAF Base Melbourne (No. 1 PD), Victoria	

== Commanding officers ==
Officers commanding No. 549 Squadron RAF
From	To	Name
January 1944	October 1945	S/Ldr. E.P.W. Bocock, DFC

== See also ==
- List of Royal Air Force aircraft squadrons
