= No. 548 Squadron RAF =

- Active: 15 Dec 1943 – 31 Oct 1945
- Country: United Kingdom
- Branch: Royal Air Force

Insignia
- Squadron Codes: TS (Apr 1944 – Oct 1945)

No. 548 Squadron RAF was a fighter squadron of the Royal Air Force (RAF) from 1943 to 1945.

== History ==
The squadron was formed at Lawnton, near Brisbane, Queensland, Australia on 15 December 1943 to provide air defence duties with Spitfires, as the RAAF Kittyhawks were inadequate for interception missions. It was first formed under the command of Squadron Leader Dave Glaser, a RAF veteran of the Battle of Britain. The first months were spent training with Wirraways and de Havilland Tiger Moths, but in April 1944 the squadron's Spitfires arrived. The squadron was made up of RAF aircrew and RAAF groundstaff. On 15 June 1944 the squadron moved initially to Livingstone Airfield and Strauss Airfield in the Northern Territory of Australia. The squadron was then relocated in October 1944 to Parap Airfield in Darwin, Northern Territory.

Only two offensive operations were undertaken by the squadron before the Japanese surrender. A sweep was conducted over Selaru Island, 300 miles north of Darwin, on 5 September 1944, and the airfield at Cape Chater, Timor was attacked on 3 June 1945.

== Disbandment ==
There has been confusion regarding when the squadron disbanded. According to some sources, the squadron was disbanded at Parap Airfield (Darwin/Civil), Northern Territory on 9 October 1945. A more recent source states that it was disbanded on 31 October at Melbourne, Victoria. The confusion is likely the result of misreadings of the squadron's Operations Record Book, which includes a handwritten note that "Sqn disbanded on 9 Oct 1945", in line with Air Force Command Order B443/45; just above this note is what appears to be a correction, at first glance appearing to be the number 31 but more likely the numeral 3 followed by a correction mark.

The squadron's Personnel Occurrence Reports (POR) show that the squadron was wound down during September 1945, when RAAF ground staff were either posted to other units or demobilised. The squadron's RAF pilots meanwhile ferried their aircraft out of the Northern Territory and were posted to Melbourne, mostly during the period 16-23 September, and given permission to "live out" while the RAF organised for their return home to the United Kingdom. The squadron's final POR, dated 2 October 1945, notes that the last member, Flying Officer I. H. Lance, RAAF, a ground staff officer who was likely the Adjutant, was posted to another squadron with effect from 3 October. It would appear therefore that the disbandment process was completed on 3 October 1945, six days ahead of the scheduled date of 9 October.

== Aircraft operated ==
Aircraft operated by No. 548 Squadron RAF
From	To	Aircraft	Version	Remarks
December 1943	April 1944	CAC Wirraway		For training
December 1943	April 1944	de Havilland Tiger Moth		For training
April 1944	October 1945	Supermarine Spitfire	Mk.VIII	Tropicalised

== Squadron bases ==
Bases and airfields used by No. 548 Squadron RAF
From	To	Base	Remarks
15 December 1943	19 January 1944	Lawnton Airfield, Queensland	
19 January 1944	25 May 1944	Petrie Airfield, Strathpine, Queensland	
25 May 1944	15 June 1944	RAAF Base Amberley, Queensland	Det. at RAAF Base Townsville, Queensland
15 June 1944	22 October 1944	Livingstone Airfield, Northern Territory	Dets. at Strauss Airfield, Northern Territory and at Truscott Airfield, Western Australia
22 October 1944	23 September 1945	Parap Airfield (Darwin/Civil), Darwin, Northern Territory	Det. at Truscott Airfield, Western Australia

== Commanding officers ==
Officers commanding No. 548 Squadron RAF
From	To	Name
January 1944	July 1944	S/Ldr. W.H.A. Wright
July 1944	February 1945	S/Ldr. R.A. Watts
February 1945	October 1945	S/Ldr. E.D. Glaser

== See also ==
- List of Royal Air Force aircraft squadrons
