= Harold North =

New Zealand flying ace of World War II

Harold Leslie North
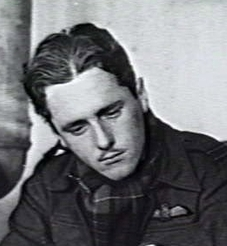
- Born: 31 October 1919; Dunedin, New Zealand
- Died: 1 May 1942 (aged 22); France
- Military career
- Allegiance: New Zealand
- Branch: Royal Air Force (1938–1942)
- Rank: Flight Lieutenant
- Nickname: Knockers
- Service number: 41608
- Units: No. 43 Squadron; No. 96 Squadron; No. 457 Squadron
- Conflicts: Second World War; Operation Dynamo; Battle of Britain; Channel Front
- Awards: Distinguished Flying Cross

Harold Leslie North, DFC (31 October 1919 – 1 May 1942) was a New Zealand flying ace of the Royal Air Force (RAF) during the Second World War. He was officially credited with the destruction of at least five German aircraft although postwar research indicates some uncertainty regarding his tally.

Born in Dunedin, North joined the RAF in 1938 and was posted to No. 43 Squadron. During the Second World War he flew Hawker Hurricane fighters extensively during the Battle of Britain, claiming a number of aerial victories. The following year, he was promoted to flight lieutenant and participated in several operations on the Channel Front with No. 457 Squadron, flying the Supermarine Spitfire. He flew a sortie to France on 1 May 1942 and was last seen in a dogfight with German fighters. Presumed killed in action, he was posthumously awarded the Distinguished Flying Cross.

== Early life ==
Born on 31 October 1919 in Dunedin, New Zealand, Harold Leslie North was the son of William Charles Dingey North and Ruby Rogers North. He was educated at Otago Boys' High School from 1933 to 1935, proceeding to Wellington Technical College the following year. He later worked as a law clerk for a barrister and solicitor in Wellington. In early 1938, and desiring a career in the Royal Air Force (RAF), he applied for a short service commission. His application was provisionally accepted, and he proceeded to the United Kingdom in September, travelling aboard the RMS Rangitane.

North, who was nicknamed 'Knockers', commenced pilot training on 31 October at No. 12 Elementary and Reserve Flying Training School at Prestwick, before going on to Uxbridge in mid-January 1939. He was confirmed in his short service commission, with effect from the date he began pilot training, and allocated the service number 41608. Further flight training was received at No. 9 Flying Training School at Hullavington, where he gained his wings in May. More advanced flying training followed, and he was granted a commission as a probationary pilot officer in early September.

== Second World War ==
With the Second World War now underway, North was posted to No. 43 Squadron, which was based at Acklington and operated the Hawker Hurricane fighter. From late 1939 to early 1940, it carried out convoy patrols, covering shipping making their way up and down the coast. By this time, North had been confirmed in his rank as a pilot officer. In February, the squadron was transferred to the north of Scotland, based at Wick, from where it protected the Royal Navy base at Scapa Flow until May. It then moved back south, where it was based at Tangmere. It was immediately in action as it helped cover the beaches at Dunkirk during Operation Dynamo, the evacuation of the British Expeditionary Force from France. The squadron's losses during this time were such that it was temporarily taken off active flying duties while it was brought back up to strength. Returning to operations in July and briefly based at Northolt, it escorted Bristol Blenheim light bombers on daylight raids to France while doing patrols at night. The following month it was back at Tangmere as the Battle of Britain escalated.

=== Battle of Britain ===
On 18 August, North was one of a number of pilots that engaged a large group of Junkers Ju 87 dive bombers that were assembling for an attack on the radar station at Poling. He shot down one Ju 87 over Thorney Island and was credited with another as probably destroyed. On 26 August, North was leading a section of the squadron as it engaged a number of Heinkel He 111 medium bombers and their escorting Messerschmitt Bf 109 fighters. He shot down one He 111 but was himself wounded when his Hurricane was damaged by cannon fire from a Bf 109. Despite this, he engaged another He 111 and probably destroyed it. He bailed out and landed at Birdham, breaking a finger. He was treated at Royal Sussex Hospital for his wounds, which were to his arm and shoulder; he also had shards of perspex from the shattered canopy of his Hurricane in his eyes.

North, newly promoted to flying officer, returned to No. 43 Squadron on 10 September. Already in poor health due to kidney troubles, his wounds would continue to trouble him. According to an acquaintance, Hector Bolitho, another New Zealander serving in the RAF, bits of shrapnel would regularly work their way through the skin of North's arms.

At the time North returned to No. 43 Squadron, it had been withdrawn from No. 11 Group and was based at Usworth near Newcastle. In mid-December, he was posted to No. 96 Squadron which was in the process of forming up at Cranage as a night fighter squadron, flying the Hurricane and tasked with the defence of Liverpool. As part of his training in night flying, North attended the Blind Approach School at Kidlington. In March 1941, the squadron began converting to the Boulton Paul Defiant. The following month, North was transferred to No. 3 Aircraft Delivery Unit, having been promoted to the rank of acting flight lieutenant.

=== Channel Front ===
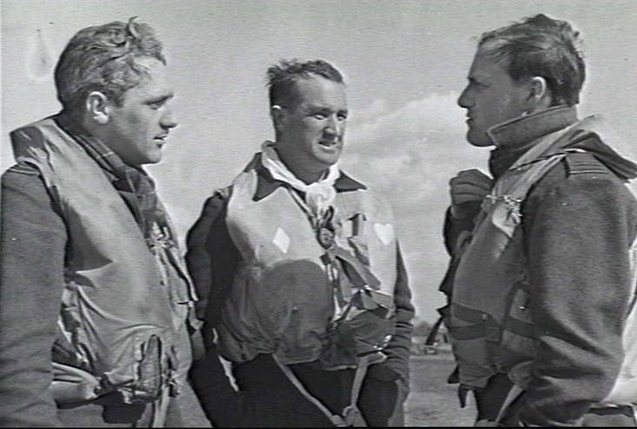
North stands on the left, next to another pilot of No. 457 Squadron; Peter Brothers, commander of the squadron, stands on the right

On 23 June, North returned to active duty as a flight commander in No. 457 Squadron, a newly formed Australian Article XV squadron. Most of its pilots were from the Royal Australian Air Force, although the commander, Squadron Leader Peter Brothers, and flight commanders were RAF personnel as were the ground crew. Based at Baginton and equipped with the Supermarine Spitfire fighter, it was in training at the time and became operational at the start of August. It was now operating from Jurby on the Isle of Man. For the next several months, it flew convoy escorts and patrols. It also served as a training nursery for pilots, and regularly saw experienced flying personnel transferred to other Australian fighter squadrons. During this time, North's rank was made substantive.

No. 457 Squadron was transferred to No. 11 Group in late March 1942, operating from Redhill. Fighter Command had switched to offensive operations, flying sorties to France. On one of its first sorties, on 26 March, North destroyed a Focke-Wulf Fw 190 fighter near Le Havre. He shot down another Fw 190 two days later, this time near Cap Gris Nez. Offensive sweeps to France continued into April, North claiming a Fw 190 as damaged on 4 April, a Fw 190 destroyed on 16 April, and another damaged on 27 April.

On 1 May, North was one of twelve No. 457 Squadron Spitfires providing cover for bombers attacking a munitions factory at Marquise. He was seen to be engaging German aircraft about 10 miles (16 km) inland from the coast, but failed to return to base. He is believed to have been killed in action. On 5 June, his award of a Distinguished Flying Cross was announced; the citation, published in The London Gazette, read:

This officer has commanded a flight since the squadron was formed. He has performed much valuable work both during the training of the squadron and in its operational activities. Displaying great courage and initiative, Flight Lieutenant North, who previously served with another unit and fought in the Battle of Britain, has destroyed at least 5 enemy aircraft.

— London Gazette, No. 35583, 5 June 1942

At the time of his death, North was credited with having shot down five German aircraft, two probably destroyed and two damaged. However, military aviation historians Christopher Shores and Clive Williams note that there may be some uncertainty around this tally, considering that two of North's confirmed victories during his service with No. 457 Squadron, those of 28 March and 16 April 1942, may instead be a damaged and a probable respectively. With no known grave, he is commemorated on the Runneymeade Memorial at Englefield Green.
