= Dave Glaser =

Ernest Derek 'Dave' Glaser
- Born: 20 April 1921
- Died: 4 July 2001 (aged 80)
- Military career
- Allegiance: United Kingdom
- Branch: Royal Air Force
- Service years: 1939–1953
- Rank: Squadron Leader
- Nickname: Dave
- Commands: No. 234 Squadron RAF; No. 548 Squadron RAF; No. 64 Squadron RAF
- Conflicts: Second World War: Battle of Britain
- Awards: Distinguished Flying Cross, Air Efficiency Award, Queen's Commendation for Valuable Service in the Air

Squadron Leader Ernest Derek 'Dave' Glaser DFC AE (20 April 1921 – 4 July 2001) was a British Royal Air Force officer of the Battle of Britain, and later a notable test pilot.

== Biography ==
Glaser was the son of a former Royal Flying Corps officer and brought up in Hampshire. He was educated at Lancing House and Bloxham School, before being accepted for flying training in the Royal Air Force Volunteer Reserve in April 1939.

=== World War II ===
In 1940, Glaser was attached to No. 65 Squadron RAF, where he flew Supermarine Spitfires alongside Jeffrey Quill and Franciszek Gruszka in the Battle of Britain. His plane became known for its nose art, representing The Laughing Cavalier. Glaser was promoted to Flight Lieutenant and in July 1940 transferred to No. 234 Squadron RAF as a flight commander. It was while serving with No. 234 that he was mistakenly shot down on 13 July 1940 by a Royal Navy warship off the English south coast. He was promoted to Pilot Officer in 1941.

He became temporary commander of the squadron in October. He was awarded the Distinguished Flying Cross in August 1942. In 1943, Glaser was posted to Australia as OC 'B' Flight of No. 549 Squadron RAF, a Spitfire squadron charged with defending Darwin against Japanese air attack. In early 1945 he was promoted Sqn Ldr and posted to command No 548 Squadron RAF, also at Darwin. In 1946 he was awarded the Air Efficiency Award.

=== Test pilot ===
After two years he returned home, was granted a permanent commission and posted to Linton-on-Ouse, Yorkshire. There he was flight commander of No. 64 Squadron RAF, a half-strength Hornet fighter squadron.

In 1949 Glaser passed the Empire Test Pilots' School and became a test pilot at the Royal Aircraft Establishment. He became a test pilot with Vickers Armstrong in 1952, and was involved in testing and developing planes such as the Vickers Varsity, Vickers Viscount and the Vickers Valiant. Glaser was also involved in testing the BAC One-Eleven. In 1979 he became flight operations manager and test pilot instructor of Rombac in Romania. In 1983 he retired from British Aerospace and worked as a successful aviation consultant. He had been awarded the military Queen's Commendation for Valuable Service in the Air in 1953, and was rewarded the commendation for civil test flying in 1968.
