= MacDonald Airfield =

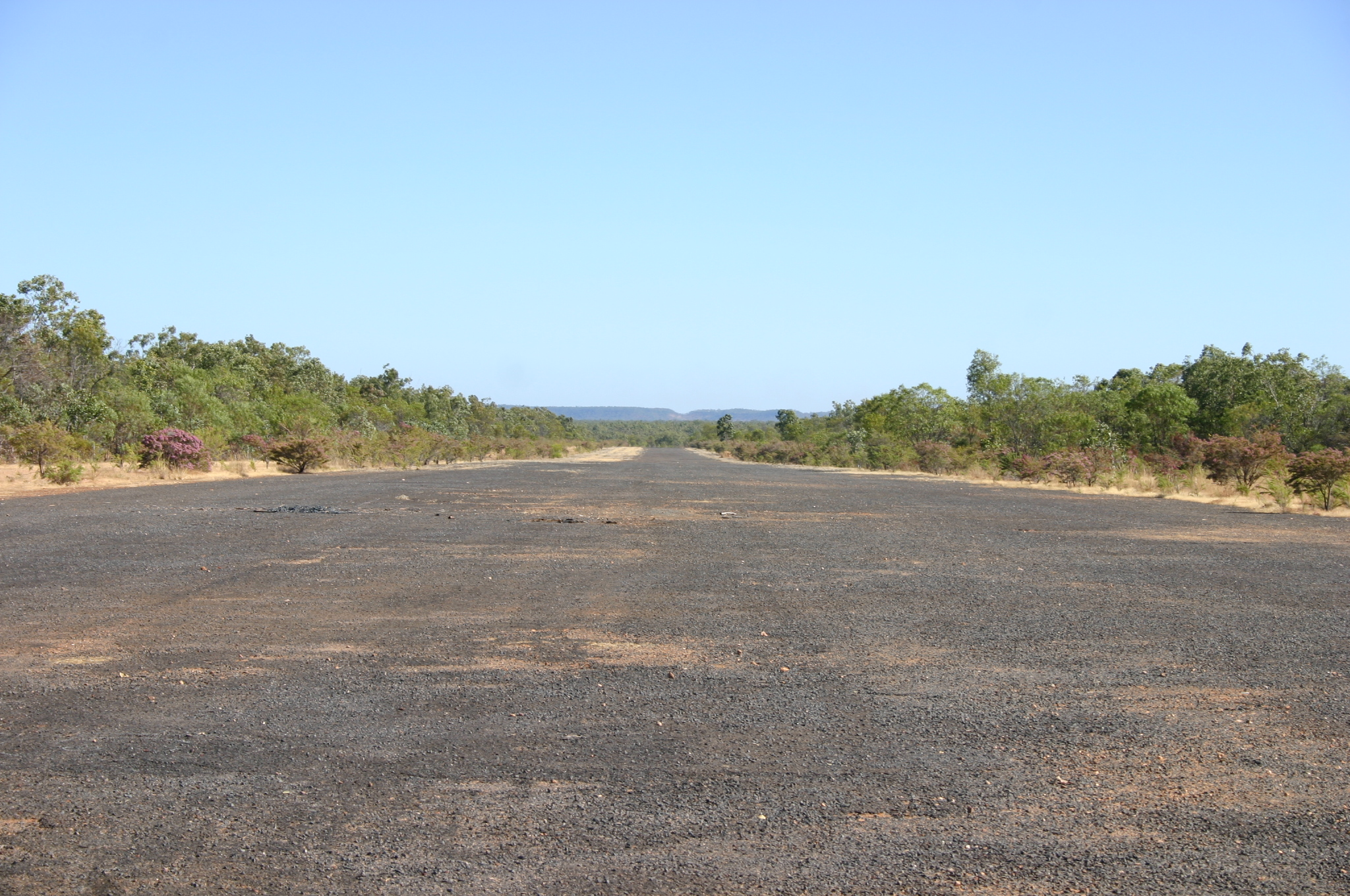
- MacDonald Airfield's Runway 2007
- IATA: none; ICAO: none

Summary
- Location: Pine Creek, Northern Territory
- Coordinates: 13°44′59.19″S 131°43′05.41″E

Map
- Location of airport in Northern Territory

Runways
Direction	Length		Surface
Direction	ft	m	Surface
	4,600	1,400	gravel

MacDonald Airfield, sometimes recorded as McDonald Airfield, was an airfield built alongside the former northern road, west of Stuart Highway, north of Pine Creek, Northern Territory, Australia during World War II. It is nearby to the Pine Creek Airfield.

== History ==
The airfield was constructed by the 43rd Engineer Regiment (US Army) in March 1942 with further improvements undertaken by the 808th Engineer Aviation Battalion between 11 May 1942 and 16 July 1942 and later by the Allied Works Council and No 1 Airfield Construction Unit RAAF.

Originally known as Burkholder Field, the runway was 6,000 feet (1,800 m) long and 100 feet (30 m) wide. Renamed MacDonald Airfield in honour of Wing Commander Joshua Roger Gray McDonald of No. 13 Squadron RAAF who was killed at Laha on 10 December 1941.

The Royal Australian Air Force occupied the base on 24 November 1942 when No. 54 Operational Base Unit administered the base.

The airfield became an Australian Army communication camp and was abandoned in 1945.

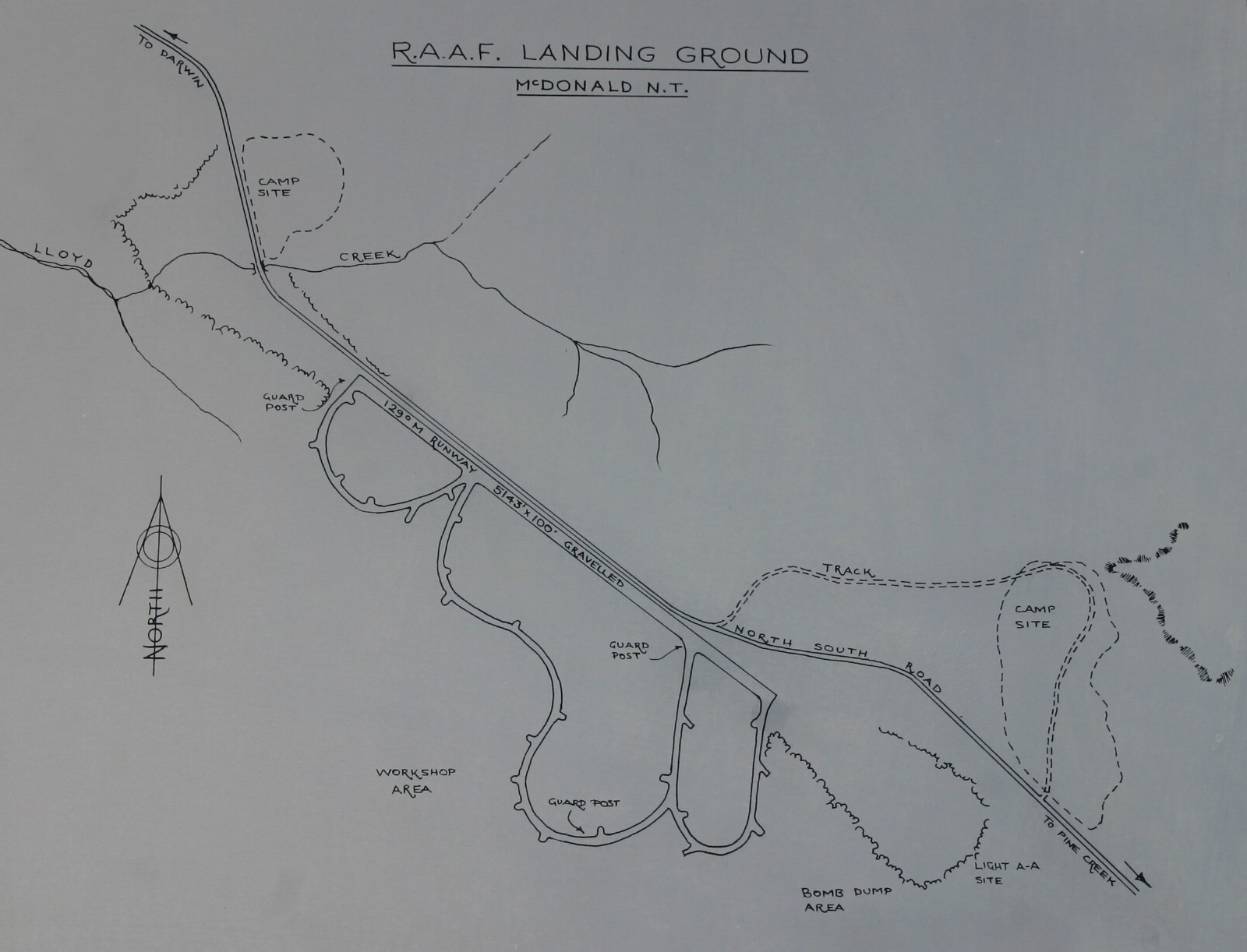
MacDonald Airfield Layout

== Units based at MacDonald Airfield ==
- 43rd Engineer Regiment (US Army)
- 808th Engineer Aviation Battalion
- No. 1 Airfield Construction Unit RAAF
- No. 18 (Netherlands East Indies) Squadron RAAF (B-25) – (18 January 1943 until 7 May 1943)
- No. 54 Operational Base Unit RAAF

== See also ==
- List of airports in the Northern Territory
