= List of airports in the Northern Territory =

This is a list of airports in the Australian territory of the Northern Territory.

== List of airports ==
Airports named in bold are Designated International Airports, even if they have limited or no scheduled international services.

Community	Airport name	Type	ICAO	IATA	Coordinates
Alice Springs	**Alice Springs Airport**	Public	YBAS	ASP	23°48′25″S 133°54′08″E
Angurugu	Groote Eylandt Airport	Public	YGTE	GTE	13°58′30″S 136°27′36″E
Batchelor	Batchelor Airfield	Military/Public	YBCR		13°03′21″S 131°01′41″E
Borroloola	Borroloola Airport	Public	YBRL	BOX	16°04′05″S 136°18′01″E
Coomalie Creek	Coomalie Creek Airfield	Military			13°00′35″S 131°07′49″E
Croker Island	Croker Island Airport	Public	YCKI	CKI	11°09′54″S 132°29′00″E
Daguragu	Kalkgurung Airport	Public	YKKG	KFG	17°25′55″S 130°48′29″E
Elcho Island	Elcho Island Airport	Public	YELD	ELC	12°01′12″S 135°34′12″E
Gapuwiyak	Lake Evella Airport	Public	YLEV	LEL	12°29′54″S 135°48′18″E
Katherine	**RAAF Base Tindal aka Katherine Tindal Civilian Airport**	Military/Public	YPTN	KTR	14°31′16″S 132°22′40″E
Lajamanu	Hooker Creek Airport	Public	YHOO	HOK	18°20′12″S 130°38′36″E
Maningrida	Maningrida Airport	Public	YMGD	MNG	12°03′22″S 134°14′03″E
Marrara, Darwin	RAAF Base Darwin	Military	YPDN	DRW	12°24′53″S 130°52′36″E
Marrara, Darwin	**Darwin International Airport**	Public	YPDN	DRW	12°24′53″S 130°52′36″E
McArthur River zinc mine	McArthur River Mine Airport	Private	YMHU	MCV	16°26′42″S 136°04′30″E
Milikapiti, Melville Island	Snake Bay Airport	Public	YSNK	SNB	11°25′22″S 130°39′13″E
Milingimbi Island	Milingimbi Airport	Public	YMGB	MGT	12°05′40″S 134°53′37″E
Nhulunbuy	Gove Airport	Public	YPGV	GOV	12°16′12″S 136°49′06″E
Noonamah, Darwin	Hughes Airfield	Military			12°41′20″S 131°05′21″E
Pirlangimpi, Melville Island	Garden Point Airport	Public	YGPT	GPN	11°23′57″S 130°25′31″E
Ramingining	Ramingining Airport	Public	YRNG	RAM	12°21′24″S 134°53′54″E
Ranger Uranium Mine	Jabiru Airport	Private	YJAB	JAB	12°39′30″S 132°53′36″E
Roper River	Ngukurr Airport	Public	YNGU	RPM	14°43′22″S 134°44′51″E
Tennant Creek	Tennant Creek Airport	Public	YTNK	TCA	19°38′04″S 134°11′00″E
Ti-Tree	Ti-Tree Airfield	Public	YTIT	-	22°07′38″S 133°25′21″E
The Granites	The Granites Airport	Private	YTGT	GTS	20°32′54″S 130°21′00″E
Victoria River	Victoria River Downs Airport	Private	YVRD	VCD	16°24′12″S 131°00′12″E
Wadeye	Port Keats Airfield	Public	YPKT	PKT	14°14′54″S 129°31′42″E
Weddell, Darwin	MKT Airfield	Private	YMKT		12°36′31″S 131°03′17″E
Wurrumiyanga	Bathurst Island Airport	Public	YBTI	BRT	11°46′09″S 130°37′11″E
Yulara	Ayers Rock Airport	Public	YAYE	AYQ	25°11′10″S 130°58′32″E

== Defunct airports ==
Community	Airport name	Type	ICAO	IATA	Coordinates
Batchelor	Gould Airfield	Military			13°05′11″S 131°02′14″E
Coomalie Creek	Coomalie Creek Airfield	Military			13°00′35″S 131°07′49″E
Daly Waters	Daly Waters Airfield	Military			16°15′42″S 133°22′50″E
Darwin	Sattler Airfield	Military			12°36′36″S 131°03′06″E
Hayes Creek	Fenton Airfield	Military			13°37′23″S 131°20′20″E
Hayes Creek	Long Airfield	Military			13°34′59″S 131°25′23″E
Katherine	Katherine Airfield	Military/Public			14°26′43″S 132°16′20″E
Katherine	Manbulloo Airfield	Military			14°35′58″S 132°11′24″E
Elsey	Gorrie Airfield	Military			15°29′14″S 133°10′49″E
Livingstone	Livingstone Airfield	Military			12°43′19″S 131°05′17″E
Noonamah, Darwin	Strauss Airfield	Military			12°39′32″S 131°04′41″E
Parap, Darwin	Parap Airfield	Military/Public			12°25′47″S 130°50′31″E
Pine Creek	MacDonald Airfield	Military			13°44′59″S 131°43′05″E
Pine Creek	Pine Creek Airfield	Military			13°49′31″S 131°50′44″E
Stuart Highway	Pell Airfield	Military			13°08′49″S 131°06′25″E

== See also ==
- List of airports in Darwin
- List of airports in Australia
