= Jabiru Airport =

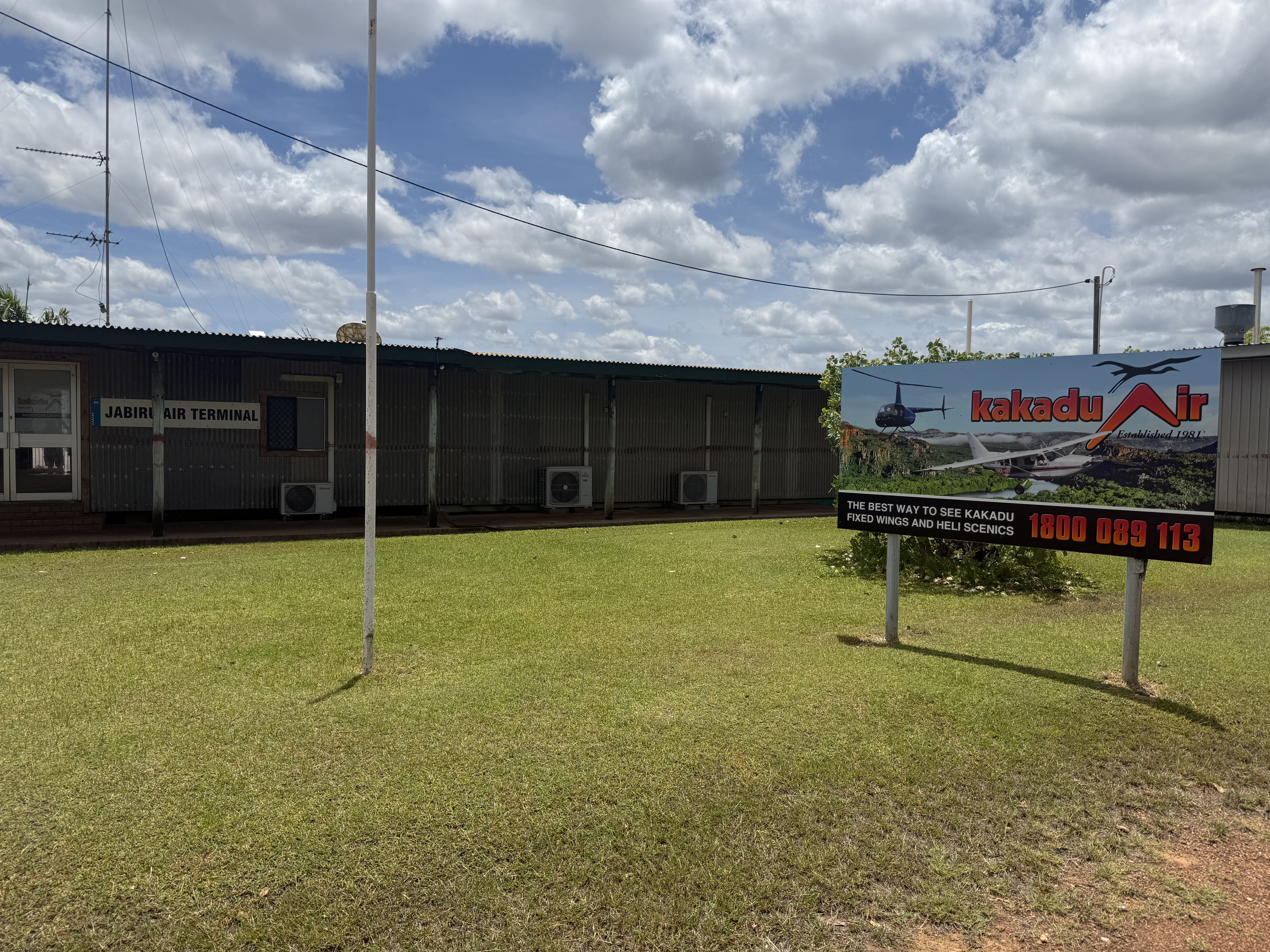
- Jabiru Airport, October 2025
- IATA: JAB; ICAO: YJAB

Summary
- Airport type: Public
- Operator: Energy Resources Australia
- Serves: Ranger Uranium Mine
- Location: Jabiru, Northern Territory, Australia
- Elevation AMSL: 85 ft / 26 m
- Coordinates: 12°39′30″S 132°53′36″E

Maps
- Location in the Northern Territory
- Interactive map of Jabiru Airport

Runways
Direction	Length		Surface
Direction	m	ft	Surface
09/27	1,402	4,600	Gravel
- Sources: Australian AIP and aerodrome chart

Jabiru Airport (IATA: JAB, ICAO: YJAB) is an airport located 1.5 nautical miles (2.8 km; 1.7 mi) northwest of Ranger Uranium Mine and east of Jabiru in the Northern Territory of Australia. Situated within the Kakadu National Park, it consists of one runway and five parking spaces for light aircraft such as Cessna 152s. Charter flight operators include AAA Charter, Kakadu Air and North Australian Helicopters.

In January 2026, Jabiru Airport was scheduled for closure and demolition as part of the rehabilitation of the former Ranger uranium mine lease, prompting concerns over the loss of essential air access for Kakadu National Park, Jabiru, and surrounding Aboriginal communities. In April 2026, the Gundjeihmi Aboriginal Corporation announced it would assume operation of the airport, preserving its continued use while longer-term arrangements for the site are negotiated.

== See also ==
- List of airports in the Northern Territory
