= Livingstone Airfield =

- IATA: none; ICAO: none

Summary
- Location: Livingstone, Northern Territory, Australia
- Built: 13 April 1942
- In use: 1942–1945
- Coordinates: 12°43′20″S 131°5′17″E

Map
- Location of airport in Northern Territory

Runways
Direction	Length		Surface
Direction	ft	m	Surface
145/215	4,700	1,450	Gravel / asphalt

Livingstone Airfield (34 mile) was an airfield at what is now Livingstone, Northern Territory, Australia during World War II.

The airfield was built by the 808th Engineer Aviation Battalion, less Company A and HQ Detachment, between 16 March 1942 until 13 April 1942. The runway was 5,000 ft × 100 ft (1,524 m × 30 m). The airfield was named after Lieutenant Livingstone of 9th Fighter Squadron of the 49th Fighter Group who was killed as result of friendly fire when he was hit by Australian anti-aircraft guns during a Japanese air raid near Cox Peninsula to the west of Darwin, Northern Territory on 4 April 1942.

== Units based at Livingstone Airfield ==
- 9th Fighter Squadron of 49th Fighter Group, Fifth Air Force, United States Army Air Forces
- No. 14 Repair & Salvage Unit RAAF
- No. 54 Squadron RAF
- No. 77 Squadron RAAF (Kittyhawk)
- No. 457 Squadron RAAF (Spitfire)
- No. 548 Squadron RAF
- 102nd Coastal Artillery Battalion (AA Separate), US Army
- 161st Light Anti-aircraft Battery, Australian Army
- H Company, 135th US Medical Regiment, US Army
- Security Guard Unit RAAF

== Japanese bombing raids on Livingstone Airfield ==
- 26 September 1942 (05:22 am)

== See also ==
- List of airports in the Northern Territory
