= Gould Airfield =

- IATA: none; ICAO: none

Summary
- Location: Batchelor, Northern Territory, Australia
- Coordinates: 13°05′11.42″S 131°02′13.88″E

Map
- Location within Northern Territory

Runways
Direction	Length		Surface
Direction	m	ft	Surface
	1,829	6,000

Gould Airfield was an airfield south of Batchelor Airfield at Batchelor, Northern Territory, Australia during World War II.

The runway was 6,000 ft × 150 ft (1,829 m × 46 m).

== History ==
In 1943, Gould Airfield and a camp was constructed by the No. 61 Works Wing RAAF, and was completed by 1944. The airfield played a key role in the Allied Forces' campaign to drive back the invading Japanese in the Southwest Pacific Region.

== Accidents & incidents ==
- On 27 January 1945, a RAAF Lockheed Ventura crashed 800 yards south-east of the airfield, killing all 6 crew members on board.

== See also ==
- List of airports in the Northern Territory
