= Petrie Airfield =

World War II military airfield in Queensland, Australia

- Queensland, Australia Petrie Airfield (Queensland)

Site information
- Type: Military airfield

Location
- Coordinates: 27°17′S 153°00′E

Site history
- In use: 1942-1945

Petrie Airfield was a World War II military airfield located just to the south of the North Pine River in what is now Lawnton, Queensland, Australia. After the war, the airfield was dismantled and the area is now part of the urban area of Petrie-Strathpine.

== History ==
The Petrie Airfield gets its name from its location in the Petrie region, in turn named after Thomas Petrie, who established his homestead Murrumba on the North Pine River In 1858.

=== World War II ===
- RAAF units based at Petrie Airfield:

83 Squadron (Boomerang)
12 Squadron (Vengeance)

- RAF units based at Petrie Airfield:

No. 549 Squadron RAF (Spitfire) Lawnton/ Strathpine December 1943 – July 1944
No. 548 Squadron RAF (Spitfire) Lawnton/ Strathpine December 1943 – July 1944

- USAAF based at Petrie Airfield:

80th Fighter Squadron (8th Fighter Group), 10 May – 20 July 1942, P-39, P-400 Airacobra

Dispersed from 8th Fighter Group HQ at Eagle Farm Airport.

== See also ==
- United States Army Air Forces in Australia (World War II)
- List of airports in Queensland
