= No. 14 Repair & Salvage Unit RAAF =

Maintenance unit of the Royal Australian Air Force during World War II

No. 14 Repair & Salvage Unit RAAF was a maintenance unit of the Royal Australian Air Force during World War II.

== History ==
Formed at Mount Druitt Aerodrome at Mount Druitt, New South Wales, Australia on 21 July 1943.

The unit was disbanded on 30 October 1945.

=== Aircraft Repairs undertaken upon ===
- Bristol Beaufort
- Curtiss P-40 Kittyhawk
- de Havilland Tiger Moth
- Lockheed Ventura
- CAC Wirraway

=== Locations ===
- Mount Druitt Aerodrome - 21 July 1943
- Pell Airfield - 19 March 1944
- Livingstone Airfield - 13 April 1944
- Ross River Aerodrome - 23 May 1944
- Woodstock Aerodrome - 8 October 1944
- Morotai Airfield - 12 March 1945

=== Commanding Officers ===
- Squadron Leader R.H. Foord - 3 August 1943
- Squadron Leader N.B. Tamlyn - 16 August 1943
- Squadron Leader O. Doutch - 19 October 1943
- Squadron Leader N.S. Lake - August 1945
