= Katherine Airfield =

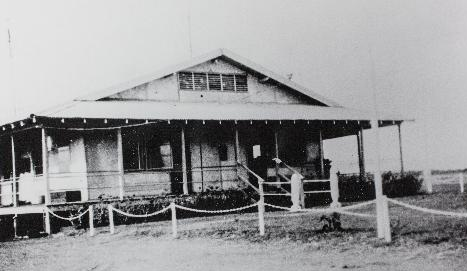
- Katherine aeradio building, 1950
- IATA: none; ICAO: none

Summary
- Location: Katherine, Northern Territory
- Opened: 1930
- Closed: 1978
- Coordinates: 14°26′43.06″S 132°16′20.31″E

Map
- Location of airport in Northern Territory

Runways
Direction	Length		Surface
Direction	ft	m	Surface
14/32	5,000	1,500

Katherine Airfield was an airfield in the town of Katherine, Northern Territory, Australia that closed in 1978 when civil operations moved to RAAF Base Tindal, 15 km (9.3 mi) south of Katherine. The site of the airfield is now home to the Katherine Museum.

== History ==
With the extension of the North Australia Railway in 1926, a bridge across the Katherine River opened, allowing local businesses to move from the rail head town of Emungalan to more favourable sites on the southern bank of the river in the new township of Katherine. Previously, a rough airstrip built in 1923 had served the area; however, with the increased development, land was sought and secured in 1930 for a permanent airport 1.5 km (0.93 mi) north-east of the town. In March 1934, Dr Clyde Fenton, newly appointed as Government Medical Officer began operating medical evacuation flights from the airport using a Gipsy Moth biplane bought with his own money. This operation would lead to the foundation of the Northern Territory Aerial Medical Service. Fenton's aircraft is preserved and on display in a purpose-built hangar at the Katherine Museum, adjacent to the former runway. During the 1930s, the airfield was used as a refuelling stop by Guinea Airways, operating flights between Darwin and Adelaide.

=== World War II ===
The civil airfield was requisitioned by the Royal Australian Air Force, and the 808th Engineer Aviation Battalion extended the airfield from 19 February 1942 to 13 April 1942. The runway was extended to 5,000 ft (1,524 m) long and 100 feet (30 m) wide and 18 dispersals without revetments were constructed. During 1943, the Department of Civil Aviation established a flight service unit at the airfield which operated until 1978 with the closure of the airfield.

==== Japanese bombing raids against Katherine Airfield ====
- 22 March 1942 (12.35pm) – Nine Japanese 'Betty' bombers attacked Katherine. Although there was little damage to buildings and facilities, an Aboriginal man was killed. The attack led to the establishment of a large military headquarters along the Katherine River.

== Accidents and incidents ==
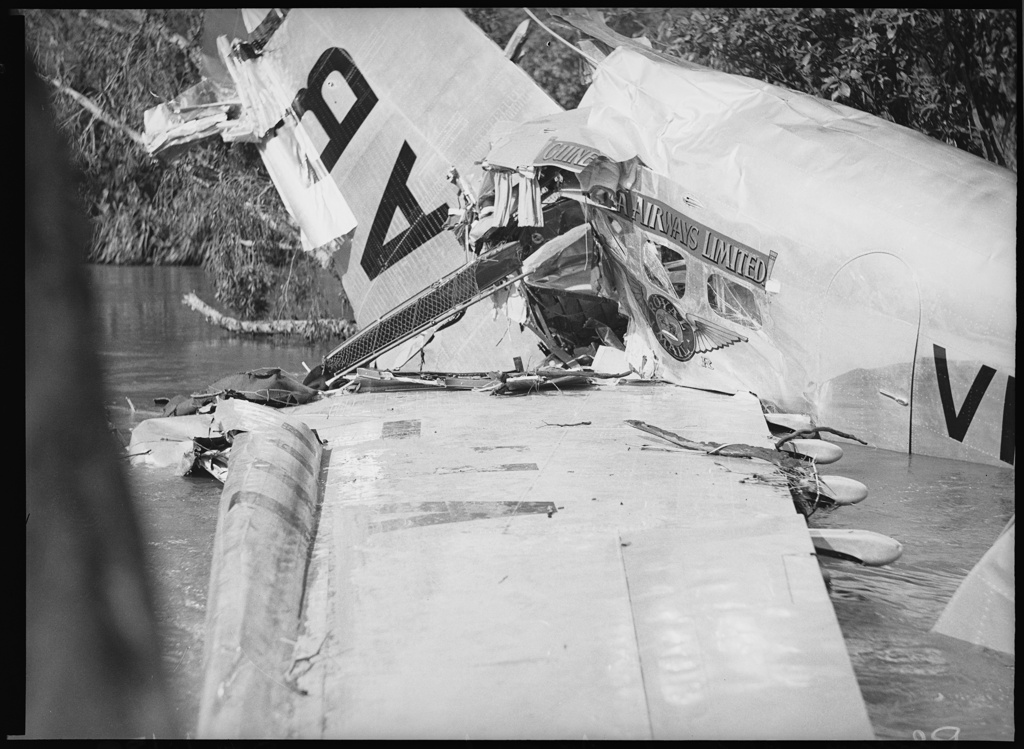
Crashed Lockheed Model 14 Super Electra, Katherine River, Northern Territory, 1939

At 7:50 am on 18 January 1939, Captain C. R. Clarke took off from the Katherine Aerodrome in his Lockheed Model 14 Super Electra of Guinea Airways (predecessor of Airlines of South Australia). According to Flying Doctor Clyde Fenton, the plane only just cleared the end of the runway before crashing into the Katherine River. Although Fenton was quick to get to the site, he was unable to save any of the four occupants. These included the three pilots and a Civil Aviation Department inspector. The aircraft was operating a scheduled flight to Adelaide. Dr Clyde Fenton was among the medical responders at the crash site.

== See also ==
- List of airports in the Northern Territory
