= Franciszek Gruszka =

Polish soldier (1910–1940)

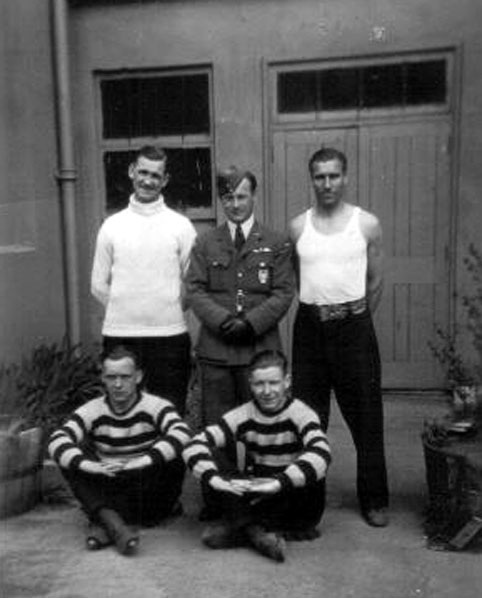
- Franciszek Gruszka and his ground crew
- Born: Franciszek Gruszka; 21 January 1910; Biłka Królewska near Lwów
- Died: 18 August 1940 (aged 30); Between Preston & Stodmarsh, Kent
- Burial place: Northwood Cemetery, Middlesex (Sec. H, Grave 202)
- Relatives: Józef Gruszka (Brother, lawyer & POW) Piotr Gruszka (Brother, philologist & Armia Krajowa soldier)
- Military career
- Allegiance: Poland; United Kingdom
- Branch: Polish Air Force; Royal Air Force
- Service years: 1931-1940
- Rank: Porucznik (Lieutenant); Flying Officer (Lieutenant)
- Service number: P.76785
- Unit: 111/6 Squadron (Polish Air Force) No. 65 "East India" Squadron
- Conflicts: World War II: Battle of Britain
- Awards: 1939-1945 Star with 'Battle of Britain' clasp (UK) Air Crew Europe Star War Medal 1939-1945

Franciszek "Frank" Gruszka (21 January 1910 – 18 August 1940), Polish soldier (porucznik), Flying Officer (F/O) of the Royal Air Force during the Battle of Britain. He was one of the first Polish airmen flying the Spitfire and the last pilot of the Battle buried with honors.

== Early life ==
He was the second oldest son of a wealthy farmer's family: His father was able to let three of his sons gain higher education: Józef Gruszka (who spent World War II as a prisoner of war in a German camp) was a lawyer, Piotr Gruszka a philologist (during the war fought with the Home Army, the Armia Krajowa), and Franciszek the fighter pilot.

Serving in the Army from 1931, he graduated from the Polish Air Force Academy in Dęblin (8th honorary promotion of 15 August 1934) and was commissioned as a pilot instructor in 111/6 squadron based near Lwów.

== Second World War ==
After the outbreak of World War II he reportedly shot down a Heinkel He 111 bomber. On 17 September he passed through Romania, Yugoslavia, and Italy to continue fighting in France, arriving in Paris on 7 October 1939. In December 1939 he was one of the first Polish fighter pilots to arrive in Great Britain. He underwent training on the Supermarine Spitfire and was commissioned as Flying Officer (F/O) and posted to No. 65 "East India" Squadron based at RAF Hornchurch.

In his memoirs (in possession of the family in Poland) he described his first flight against a German bomber formation (presumably on 14 August 1940): "Battle of August. I am starting to fight. Many Germans above and just twelve of us (only two Poles are me and Władzio Szulkowski). We attack bombers, German fighters attack us from behind. One of them is closer and closer. I make a sudden turn, get his tail, and send a series (burst of shots). He is going down to the clouds, inertial. I can not go after him, because in the same moment two other 'Jerries' attack me. Have no chance, I hide in clouds..."

On 18 August 1940 he took off in Spitfire R6713 to intercept a German bomber formation. He was seen dog-fighting over Canterbury and Manston and chasing a fleeing German fighter. He never returned to Hornchurch airfield. There were no reports regarding his fate, and his comrades assumed that he was—at best—a prisoner. No news was forthcoming however, and he was classified by the RAF as missing in action.

== Burial ==
In the spring of 1975 a World War II aviation archaeology group found the remnants of the aircraft and its pilot in marshes between Preston and Stodmarsh, near Canterbury, Kent. Because of the swampy nature of the ground, the uniform, Polish airman's emblem, and some personal possessions remained in good condition even after 35 years; these were displayed in the Polish Institute and Sikorski Museum in London. Identification of the body was possible due to a golden fountain pen with an engraved dedication from his fellow pilots.

F/O Franciszek Gruszka was buried with full military honours at Northwood Cemetery, Middlesex (Sec. H, Grave 202) on 17 July 1975. Until his remains were recovered he had been commemorated on the Polish War Memorial at RAF Northolt (Panel 20). Present at the service were Jeffrey Quill, the former Spitfire test pilot, and Dave Glaser, both of whom had served with Gruszka in 65 Squadron during the Battle of Britain.

He was awarded posthumously with 1939–1945 Star with Battle of Britain clasp, Air Crew Europe Star, and War Medal 1939–1945.

== See also ==
- List of people who disappeared
