= No. 457 Squadron RAAF =

Royal Australian Air Force squadron

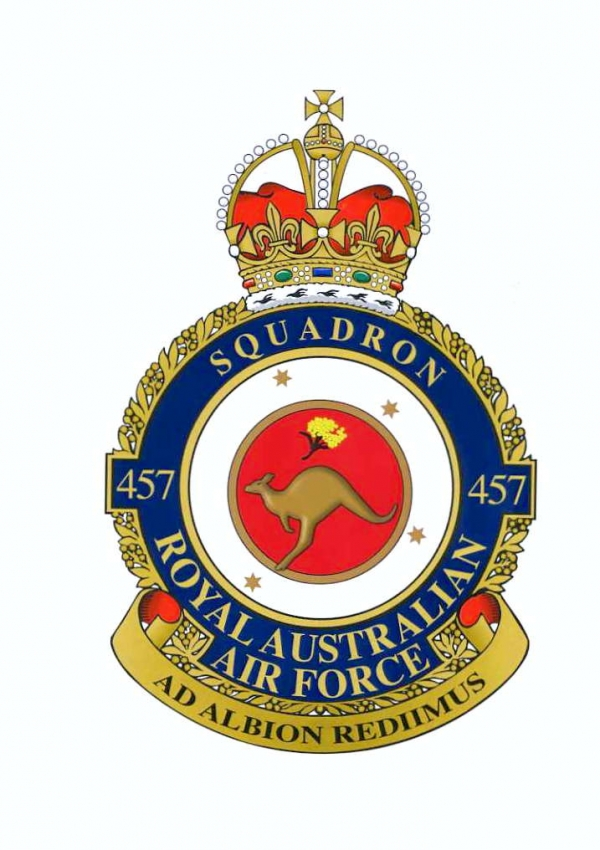
- 457 Squadron badge
- Active: 16 June 1941 – 7 November 1945
- Country: Australia
- Allegiance: United Kingdom (1941–1942)
- Branch: Royal Australian Air Force
- Role: Fighter
- Nickname: "Grey Nurse Squadron"
- Battle honours: Fortress Europe, 1940–1944; Pacific, 1941–1945; Darwin, 1941–1944; Morotai; Borneo, 1945; Defence of Britain, 1940–1945

Commanders
- Notable commanders: Peter Malam Brothers

Insignia
- Squadron codes: BP (June 1941 – March 1942); XB (1943); ZP (January 1943 – November 1945)

Aircraft flown
- Fighter: Supermarine Spitfire (1941–1945)
- Trainer: CAC Wirraway (1942); Ryan ST (1942)

No. 457 Squadron was a Royal Australian Air Force (RAAF) fighter squadron of World War II. Equipped with Supermarine Spitfire fighters, it was formed in England during June 1941 under Article XV of the Empire Air Training Scheme. The squadron was transferred to Australia in June 1942 and saw combat in the South West Pacific Area before being disbanded in November 1945.

The squadron saw combat against both Nazi Germany and the Empire of Japan during the war. From March to May 1942 it was based in southern England and flew missions over German-occupied France during which it shot down at least five Luftwaffe aircraft. After being deployed to Australia, No. 457 Squadron was based near Darwin as part of No. 1 Wing RAAF and intercepted several Japanese raids on Allied bases in northern Australia between March and November 1943. The squadron remained at Darwin and saw almost no combat during 1944, but moved to Morotai and later Labuan in 1945 from where it attacked Japanese positions in the Netherlands East Indies and Borneo as part of Allied offensives in these areas.

== History ==
=== Britain ===
No. 457 Squadron was formed at RAF Baginton in England on 16 June 1941. It was equipped with Supermarine Spitfires and was the second RAAF fighter unit to be formed in England after No. 452 Squadron. The establishment of both these squadrons formed part of an expansion of RAF Fighter Command which sought to improve its ability to defend Britain from a renewed German air offensive and to conduct offensive operations over occupied Europe. At the time of its formation the squadron's commanding officer, Squadron Leader Peter Malam Brothers, both flight commanders and all members of the ground crew were British, but most pilots were Australian. The squadron's ground crew component had been formed at RAAF Station Williamtown in Australia on 10 June, and departed for England on 7 August. On the same day No. 457 Squadron moved to RAF Jurby and thence to RAF Andreas, which were both situated on the Isle of Man to undertake training. While at the Isle of Man the squadron trained both its own pilots and pilots from other squadrons for operational duties, and for a time functioned as an operational training unit at RAF Andreas. It also escorted Allied convoys in the Irish Sea, but did not make contact with German aircraft. By October all the British pilots other than Brothers and the flight commanders had been replaced by Australians. The squadron's ground crew arrived in Britain during October and November, making it an almost entirely Australian unit.

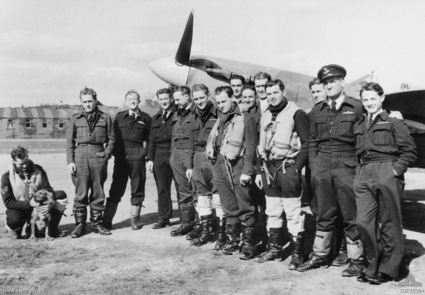
Group photo of No. 457 Squadron's pilots at RAF Station Redhill in 1942

In March 1942 the squadron moved to RAF Redhill, Surrey where it assumed No. 452 Squadron's front line duties as part of No. 11 Group RAF. These included shipping protection patrols, escorting bombers, conducting fighter sweeps over northern France and contributing to the air defence of southern England. Fighter Command had received authorisation to launch a full-scale offensive campaign against German air units shortly before No. 457 Squadron arrived at Redhill, and it became part of this effort. The squadron first saw action on 26 March when Brothers shot down a Bf 109 during a multi-squadron fighter sweep over France, though one of its Spitfires was lost in this action. By the end of its first week of operations No. 457 Squadron had shot down three German aircraft and inflicted damage on several others and it went on to conduct 32 operations over German territory by 26 April. These operations often encountered fierce opposition, and German Fw 190 fighters proved superior to the Spitfire Mark Vs that No. 457 Squadron was equipped with. The squadron scored its last victory over Europe on 29 April, though fighter sweeps over France continued until almost the end of May.

On 28 May 1942 British Prime Minister Winston Churchill agreed to an Australian Government request to dispatch three fully equipped Spitfire squadrons to Australia to reinforce the RAAF. The squadrons selected were the Australian No. 452 and No. 457 Squadrons as well as the British No. 54 Squadron RAF. Accordingly, No. 457 Squadron was withdrawn from operations on 28 May to prepare to be redeployed to Australia. By this time its pilots had been credited with five confirmed "kills" and another four "probables" and damaging seven aircraft. On 20 June the squadron left England on board the MV Stirling Castle, which was also carrying the men of No. 452 and No. 54 Squadrons.

=== Darwin ===
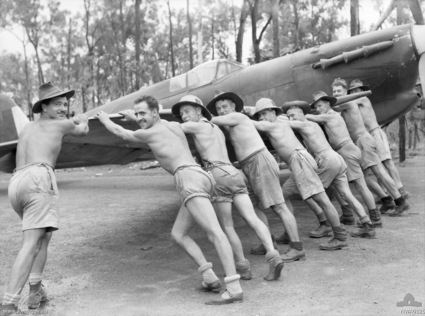
No. 457 Squadron ground crew push a Spitfire into its dispersal bay at Livingstone Airfield during February 1943

The Stirling Castle arrived at Melbourne on 13 August. After being given 14 days leave the squadron's personnel reassembled at Richmond, New South Wales on 6 September. On 7 October it became part of No. 1 Wing RAAF along with No. 54 and No. 452 Squadrons. Most of the Spitfires intended for the wing had been diverted to the Middle East during the voyage to Australia, however, and the squadron initially only had CAC Wirraway and Ryan ST aircraft for training purposes. No. 457 Squadron was fully equipped with Spitfires by November and moved to Camden on the 7th of the month where it continued an intensive training program. In December the squadron was informed that it would be deployed to Darwin in the Northern Territory to counter the Japanese air raids against the town. The squadron's advance party departed on 31 December, and the main body followed by sea on 12 January 1943. No. 457 Squadron commenced air operations from Batchelor Airfield on 20 January and moved to Livingstone Airfield on the last day of the month.

No. 457 Squadron first saw combat against the Japanese in March 1943. Although the squadron was scrambled a number of times in February, it did not claim its first "kill" until 7 March when two Spitfires shot down a Mitsubishi Ki-46 "Dinah" reconnaissance aircraft near Darwin. On 15 March No. 1 Wing's three squadrons intercepted a large raid on Darwin, and No. 457 Squadron shot down two A6M Zeros and damaged another of the fighters. The squadron was also credited with damaging a Mitsubishi G4M "Betty" bomber and claimed another three Zeros as "probables". No further Japanese aircraft were encountered over northern Australia until May. During this period No. 457 Squadron practiced tactics and cooperation with RAAF and Australian Army units. Flying was normally limited to just one hour each day, however.

On 2 May No. 1 Wing responded to a major Japanese raid on Darwin. In the resulting air battle No. 457 Squadron shot down one fighter and claimed another two "probables", but lost two Spitfires. Overall, the RAAF suffered 14 Spitfires destroyed or damaged while claiming only six "kills", and the operation was not considered a success. Seven days later No. 457 Squadron deployed a detachment of six Spitfires to Milingimbi Island after the island's airfield was attacked. This detachment intercepted Japanese raids on 10 and 28 May, shooting down two Zeros and two Bettys for the loss of three Spitfires. The squadron also continued to take part in operations over the Darwin region, seeing combat on a number of occasions. During the last major battle near the town on 6 July No. 457 Squadron shot down a Zero and damaged five Bettys, but lost three Spitfires.

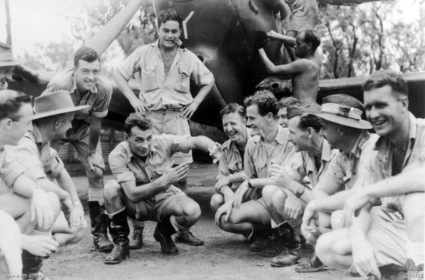
Flying Officer John Smithson demonstrating how he shot down two Japanese bombers on 12 November 1943

Japanese air activity over northern Australia dropped away after 6 July, and No. 457 Squadron saw little further combat. As a result, the squadron's personnel suffered greatly from boredom. No. 457 Squadron scored its next "kills" on 17 August, when its aircraft shot down three of the four Dinahs sent over Darwin that day; the fourth was destroyed by No. 1 Wing's acting commander, Wing Commander Clive Caldwell. The squadron shot down another two Dinahs on 20 August. On 7 September No. 1 Wing intercepted a Japanese reconnaissance aircraft escorted by 20 fighters. In the ensuing battle No. 457 Squadron shot down four Zeros without loss. On 4 November No. 457 Squadron deployed six Spitfires to Drysdale River Mission Airfield, and two days later they intercepted and damaged a Japanese reconnaissance aircraft. The squadron maintained a detachment at Drysdale River Mission until December, when No. 54 Squadron assumed this duty. During the early hours of 12 November three No. 457 Squadron Spitfires were part of a force which intercepted a raid on Darwin. No. 457 Squadron pilot Flying Officer John Smithson made the only interception and destroyed two Betty bombers.

The attack on 12 November was the final Japanese raid on the Darwin area. As a result, No. 1 Wing's flying squadrons had little to do and the pilots became bored. No. 457 Squadron conducted little operational flying until 8 March 1944, when it and No. 452 Squadron were ordered to Perth, Western Australia in response to fears that a Japanese naval force would raid the area. The squadrons departed Darwin on 9 March and arrived at RAAF Station Guildford (modern Perth Airport) three days later after flying through very difficult weather conditions. No attack eventuated, however, and the squadron returned to Livingstone Airfield between 23 and 28 March. The squadron next saw action on 18 April when two of its Spitfires took part in an attack on a Japanese radar station in the Babar Islands. In May 1944, No. 1 Wing's headquarters and No. 57 and 457 Squadrons were deployed to Exmouth Gulf, Western Australia to protect the facilities which had been established to refuel the British Eastern Fleet before Operation Transom, during which the fleet attacked Surabaya, Java. No. 457 Squadron departed for Exmouth Gulf on 10 May and returned to its new base at Sattler Airfield on the 24th of the month. The squadron again provided a detachment at Drysdale River Mission from 1 June 1944 and began to be reequipped with Mark VIII Spitfires on 2 July.

=== Morotai and Labuan ===
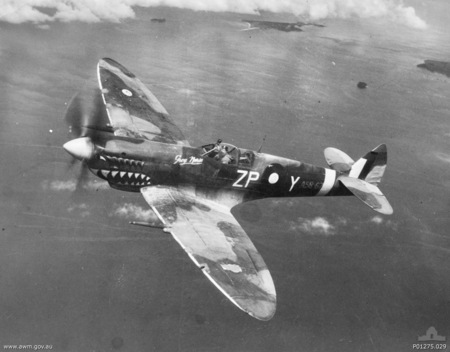
One of No. 457 Squadron's Spitfires near Labuan in 1945

On 1 July 1944 No. 452 and No. 457 Squadrons were transferred to the newly formed No. 80 Wing RAAF. This wing had been established to support a planned offensive from Darwin into the Netherlands East Indies (NEI). The offensive was cancelled in June, but this was not communicated to the wing, which continued to train for the operation until August. After the operation was cancelled the wing and its squadrons had no purpose, but continued to conduct training exercises as a means of maintaining morale. In November the wing was informed that it was to move to Morotai island in the NEI to take part in Allied offensives in the region.

No. 457 Squadron's movement to Morotai was delayed until early 1945. The squadron's ground crew departed Darwin by sea on 18 January and arrived on the island on 1 February. The Spitfires departed Sattler on 6 February and arrived at Morotai two days later. No. 457 Squadron flew its first operations from Morotai on 10 February. The squadron's main roles in this period were to conduct ground attack missions against Japanese camps and shipping as well as escorting other aircraft engaged in attacking these targets. This involved a heavy workload, and the squadron flew over 293 operational sorties between February and the end of April. From May No. 457 Squadron's Spitfires began using dive bombing tactics as well as strafing targets with their guns.

No. 457 Squadron participated in the Borneo Campaign during the final months of the war. On 27 May it was ordered to prepare for deployment, and on 5 June its personnel and equipment sailed for Labuan island off the north-west coast of Borneo. During this operation the squadron was attached to No. 81 Wing. The Spitfires departed Morotai on 17 June and commenced operations from Labuan two days later alongside No. 76 Squadron RAAF with the primary roles of providing air support to Allied troops in the area and air defence for the island. On 20 June two No. 457 Squadron fighters shot down a Dinah; this was the squadron's first "kill" since 12 November 1943. Operations against the Japanese continued until the end of the war on 15 August 1945. During the war 25 of the squadron's Australian personnel were killed.

Following the Japanese surrender No. 457 Squadron initially remained at Labuan. During this period it flew security patrols as well as training exercises and air tests. The squadron's serviceable aircraft left Labuan on 9 October for Oakey, Queensland and arrived there on the last day of the month. No. 457 Squadron was officially disbanded at Labuan on 7 November 1945. Following the war the squadron was awarded the battle honours "Fortress Europe, 1940–1944", "Pacific, 1941–1945", "Darwin, 1941–1944", "Morotai", "Borneo, 1945" and "Defence of Britain, 1940–1945".

== Aircraft operated ==
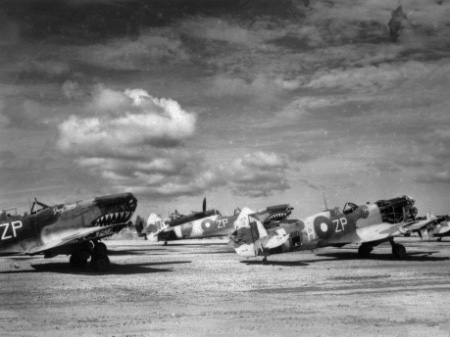
Wrecked Spitfires of No. 457 Squadron awaiting disposal by being dumped in the sea at Labuan, 1946

No. 457 Squadron operated the following aircraft:

From	To	Aircraft	Version
June 1941	September 1941	Supermarine Spitfire	Mk.I
September 1941	February 1942	Supermarine Spitfire	Mk.IIa
December 1941	May 1942	Supermarine Spitfire	Mk.Vb
September 1942	November 1942	CAC Wirraway	
September 1942	November 1942	Ryan ST	
September 1942	July 1944	Supermarine Spitfire	Mk.Vc
July 1944	October 1945	Supermarine Spitfire	Mk.VIII

== Squadron bases ==
No. 457 Squadron operated from the following bases and airfields:

From	To	Base	Remark
16 June 1941	7 August 1941	RAF Baginton, Warwickshire	
7 August 1941	3 October 1941	RAF Jurby, Isle of Man	
3 October 1941	23 March 1942	RAF Andreas, Isle of Man	
23 March 1942	31 May 1942	RAF Redhill, Surrey	
31 May 1942	18 June 1942	RAF Kirton-in-Lindsey, Lincolnshire	
18 June 1942	13 August 1942	en route to Australia	
13 August 1942	6 September 1942	Melbourne, Victoria	
6 September 1942	7 November 1942	RAAF Station Richmond, New South Wales	
7 November 1942	18 January 1943	Camden Airfield, New South Wales	
18 January 1943	31 January 1943	Batchelor Airfield, Northern Territory	
31 January 1943	10 January 1944	Livingstone Airfield, Northern Territory	Dets. at Drysdale River Mision, Western Australia and Millingimbi, Northern Territory
10 January 1944	19 January 1944	Sattler Airfield, Northern Territory	
19 January 1944	11 March 1944	Livingstone Airfield, Northern Territory	
11 March 1944	25 March 1944	RAAF Station Guildford, Western Australia	
25 March 1944	10 May 1944	Livingstone Airfield, Northern Territory	
10 May 1944	24 May 1944	en route to Exmouth Gulf, Western Australia	
24 May 1944	6 February 1945	Sattler, Northern Territory	Dets. at RAAF Learmonth, Western Australia and Drysdale River Mission, Western Australia
8 February 1945	5 June 1945	Morotai Island, Netherlands East Indies	
5 June 1945	7 November 1945	Labuan, Malaysia	

== Commanding officers ==
No. 457 Squadron was commanded by the following officers:

From	To	Name
20 June 1941	May 1942	Squadron Leader P.M Brothers
4 June 1942	2 February 1944	Squadron Leader K.E. James
2 February 1944	27 November 1944	Squadron Leader T.H. Trimble
27 November 1944	31 August 1945	Squadron Leader B.D. Watson
31 August 1945	7 November 1945	Flight Lieutenant D.H. Maclean
