= Emkaytee Airfield =

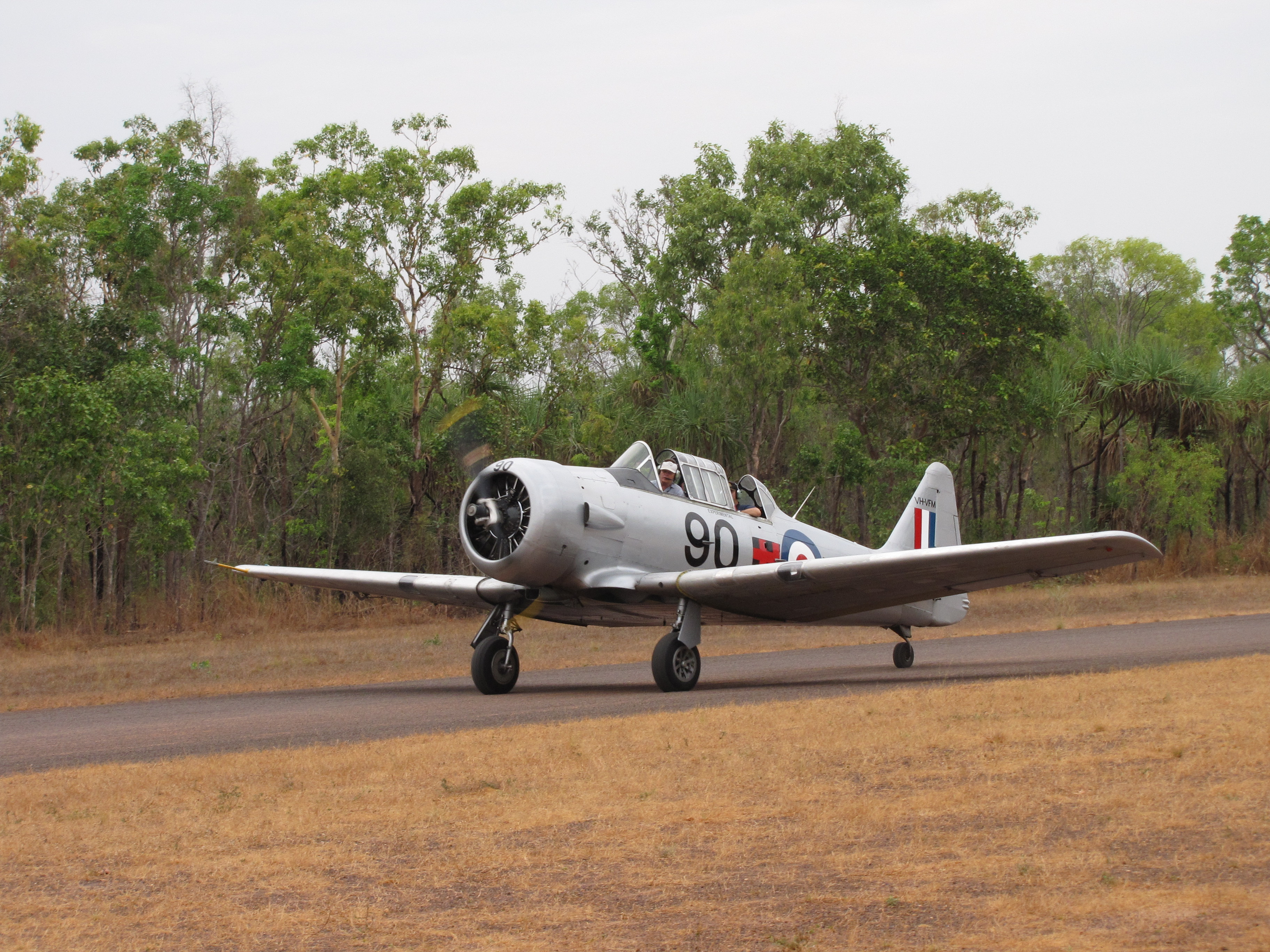
- North American AT-6D Harvard III Taxiing at Emkaytee
- IATA: none; ICAO: YMKT

Summary
- Airport type: Private
- Owner: Kath and Ralph Meyering
- Operator: Top End Flying Club
- Serves: Darwin, Palmerston
- Location: Weddell, Northern Territory
- Elevation AMSL: 75 ft (23 m)
- Coordinates: 12°36′31.38″S 131°03′17.24″E

Maps
- Location in the Northern Territory Emkaytee Airfield (Northern Territory)
- Interactive map of Emkaytee Airfield

Runways
Direction	Length		Surface
Direction	m	ft	Surface
07/25	1,200	3,937	Bitumen

Emkaytee Airfield, also known as MKT Airfield, is a private airport in the Northern Territory of Australia located in the locality of Weddell, Northern Territory about 40 km (25 mi) south of the territory capital of Darwin City. The airfield has been operated by the Meyering family since 1980. Predominately used for recreational flying by ultralight aircraft, Emkaytee also provides flight training, aircraft maintenance and fuel supplies. The airfield has been used by the Australian Army, Royal Australian Air Force, customs and emergency services as a training and staging facility. Based on aircraft movements Emkaytee is the Northern Territory's second busiest after Darwin International Airport and provides an alternative destination for visiting light aircraft.

== Airport facilities ==
The airfield has a single runway 07/25 which is 1,200 m (3,900 ft) long. This runway was sealed with a bitumen surface in 2010, opening 16 June that year and was funded through private enterprise. Along with this project, other recent upgrades include the installation of aviation fuel facilities, facelifts to hangars and the construction of new offices and training rooms for instructors and student pilots. There is currently no runway lighting available. Pilots utilise a Common Traffic Advisory Frequency (CTAF) to safely co-ordinate arrivals and departures as there is no control tower located at this airport. Emkaytee is listed as an approved flight training facility by Recreational Aviation Australia In late 2012, an all weather tie-down area on the southern side of the airfield was sealed with bitumen. The aircraft maintenance facility is operated by Aerospace Engineering.

== Commercial operations ==
In addition to the Top End Flying Club's recreational and flight training facilities, Helifish Pty Ltd, operate day trips and fishing adventure packages to remote locations around the region as well as scenic flights and charters using Robinson R22 and R44 helicopters.Aerospace Engineering provides aircraft and component repair and maintenance services.

== Future of Emkaytee ==
In September 2010 the Northern Territory Government held a community conference and design forum seeking input for the proposed development of a new satellite city in the locality of Weddell. Emkaytee Airfield is located within the lands allocated for this development, During this conference, a number of options were discussed regarding the future of the airport. Based on preliminary findings, a buffer zone of at least 350 m (1,150 ft) at either end of the runway would need to be factored into the design of the city if the airfield is to be retained as an aviation facility.

The options discussed expanding the airport to become a major general aviation hub and second airport for the Greater Darwin area, using the existing airfield and facilities as part of a business park type development, or removing the airport altogether and relocating the Top End Flying Club and other tenants to another airfield in the region. Some work has been undertaken by the Government to reseal the nearby Hughes Airfield, but no formal commitment has been announced for a second airport at this time. A Northern Territory Government spokesman did comment that the preferred runway alignment for such a facility would be 11/29 in a meeting with the Civil Aviation Safety Authority in February 2012.

== Accidents and incidents ==
On 1 April 2013, a Cessna 210 aircraft en route from the remote Bullo Station to Emkaytee Airfield lost radio contact after encountering thunderstorms over water approximately 100 km north of Wadeye. A search and rescue effort located some small pieces of wreckage and three bodies. There were four people on board the aircraft, including local Darwin football identity Stuart Sceney and his family.

== See also ==
- List of airports in the Northern Territory
