= Wentworth D'Arcy Uhr =

Australian gold prospector (1845–1907)

- Born: 31 October 1845; Wivenhoe station, Moreton Bay, Queensland, Australia
- Died: 18 February 1907 (aged 61)
- Citizenship: British Empire
- Occupations: Native Police officer, drover, gold prospector
- Spouses: Jane Hayes; Myra Essie Thompson
- Children: 2

Wentworth D'Arcy Uhr (31 October 1845 – 18 February 1907) was an officer in the paramilitary Native Police in the British colony of Queensland. After being demoted for poor conduct, he resigned from this force and became a drover, leading the first herds of cattle into the region now known as the Northern Territory. He later became, amongst other vocations, a gold prospector, butcher and hotelier. Throughout his life, Uhr actively engaged in multiple incidents of frontier violence including several massacres of Aboriginals. He was also the subject of numerous court cases defending charges which ranged from murder and assault to race-fixing and fraud. In later life he moved to Western Australia and became a business partner with Charles Kidman, brother of the famous pastoralist, Sidney Kidman.

== Early life ==
Wentworth D'Arcy Uhr was born at Wivenhoe station on the upper reaches of the Brisbane River on 31 October 1845. His father was Edmund Blucher Uhr, a squatter who had previously set up runs for prominent colonist Richard Jones at Patrick's Plains, Liverpool Plains and at Tent Hill. Conflict with Aboriginals defending the usurpation of their lands led to the death of Wentworth's uncle, John Uhr, and, despite subsequent extrajudicial killings of local Aboriginals, the family were forced to move to the Wide Bay-Burnett region of the colony. After setting up a pastoral run at Mundooya, they settled at the township of Maryborough where Wentworth's father became a magistrate and the proprietor of a boiling down establishment.

== Native Police ==
As a magistrate, Wentworth's father Edmund B. Uhr had frequent interaction with the Native Police. This force was a government funded paramilitary corps designed to brutally suppress Aboriginals who resisted British occupation. Edmund later requested that the Queensland Government provide a position for his son in the Native Police and Wentworth was appointed as an Acting sub-Inspector in 1865. Wentworth's brother, Reginald Charles Uhr, was already an officer in this force, directing "dispersals of blacks" around Bowen and Cardwell.

Wentworth D'arcy Uhr's first major duty in the Native Police was to provide an armed escort for the expedition of William Landsborough to the Gulf of Carpentaria in 1866. They arrived at Burketown in April to find the settlement in an epidemic of fever and went over to nearby Bentinck Island and Sweers Island to avoid illness. At Sweers Island, Uhr and his troopers shot several of the local people. Returning to Burketown in June, Uhr was soon ordered to conduct a long distance pursuit to arrest several horse thieves, a journey which took him 1500 miles into north-west New South Wales.

In 1868, Uhr and his troopers conducted three major massacres of Aboriginals in the Gulf area. The first at the McArthur River, the second just south of Burketown, and the third near the Norman River. Around a hundred people were killed and according to a newspaper correspondent, the Burketown residents were "delighted with the wholesale slaughter". Dr Henry Challinor, one of the few Queensland politicians who was consistently opposed to the ruthless methods of the Native Police, led calls for an inquiry. Uhr was demoted and forced to travel to Brisbane and front an investigation into the massacres. He received the support of family, the media and the government and he was exonerated of any wrongdoing. He returned to Burketown but quit the Native Police in 1869.

Uhr remained in Burketown as a private citizen but continued to be a controversial figure. During the years 1870 and 1871, he became involved in legal disputes with William Landsborough and other officials, and was accused of kidnapping Aboriginal children. In a separate incident, Uhr was arrested for the murder of an Aboriginal man at Dalgonally station south of Normanton. His hearing was postponed and he was eventually acquitted by local magistrates.

== Droving ==
In 1872, Uhr was contracted by Mathew Dillon Cox to help guide and drive his herds of cattle from Rockhampton to the frontier region around Palmerston in the Northern Territory in what was the first cattle drive along the Gulf-McArthur-Katherine route. The journey involved transgressing through the lands of number of Aboriginal clans and four major incidents of violence occurred. The first was 100 miles west of Burketown where in response to a boomerang being thrown at one of Cox's men, local Aboriginals were shot at, rounded up and forced to provide hostages. The second occurred west of the McArthur River at a place called Calico Creek. Here, after spears were thrown, Uhr and his colleagues opened up into sustained rifle-fire. After the Aboriginals retreated, the drovers rode up and down the creek, burning a village and its contents. In a separate incident, the droving group took Aboriginal children from another clan. Later, at the Wickham River 50 miles from the Roper River, a "regular pitched battle" took place where after their horses were speared, Uhr "ordered every man to arms...and made them fire by files". After half an hour of "continuous rattle of rifle shots" where "each man took deliberate aim", the Aboriginal people targeted had "fearful proofs in the numbers of their comrades who writhed or lay forever motionless".

In September the group arrived at a British supply depot on the Roper River. While here, Cox and Uhr had a disagreement which resulted in Uhr knocking down Cox and pulling out a large handful of his hair. As there were magistrates posted at the Roper depot, Cox officially charged Uhr with assault in what was the first known court proceeding in that area of the Northern Territory. William Bloomfield Douglas presided over the case and it was settled when Uhr agreed to an immediate dismissal from his position on the condition that Cox supplied him with provisions to head to the new gold diggings around Port Darwin.

== Gold prospecting ==
After taking his leave of Cox's droving party, Uhr became a gold prospector and became the first to lodge a claim at the Pine Creek goldfields in 1872.

== Butcher at Palmer River ==
By 1875, Uhr followed the gold rushes back to Northern Queensland and became a butcher at the Palmer River Goldfields selling fresh meat to the diggers. He set up a store at Uhr's Camp between Maytown and Byerstown. There was frequent violence between the miners and the local Aboriginals who were forcibly displaced from their homes. Uhr, again, became involved at the forefront of these skirmishes. After a Chinese miner was killed by Aboriginals, Uhr organised an armed posse to track down and collectively punish Aboriginals in the area. They found an encampment to attack and despite "hard fighting" with breechloaders and revolvers, they were forced to retreat. Uhr later wrote an open letter demanding a large contingent of Native Police to be based on the Palmer River to destroy Aboriginal resistance in the area. In early 1876, the request was granted and Inspector Townsend and his troopers were sent to the region.

== Return to Northern Territory ==
Uhr remained in northern Queensland until 1880 when he returned to the Northern Territory undertaking further droving and prospecting work. In 1883, he was again at the McArthur River guiding overlanders across the stock route. Here, a group of Aboriginals killed several of his horses and a white man named Fraser. Uhr, with the assistance of stockmen travelling in the area with Nathaniel Buchanan, "followed up the blacks" to a camp 10 miles from the river. Here he conducted a massacre, the results of which so disturbed Donald Swan of Nat Buchanan's group that only death threats against Swan prevented him from reporting it to authorities.

Uhr resided around Palmerston and Pine Creek, establishing pubs, butchering businesses, pastoral runs and investing in mining leases. He was publicly supportive of mounted police massacres of Aboriginals resisting colonisation and he was also active in anti-Chinese immigration organisations. Uhr himself led further vigilante raids of Aboriginal people on the Mary River and Goyder River. He was involved in several legal proceedings and won damages in 1885 to the value of 3,000 Pounds sterling after a wrongful arrest for cattle theft.

== Coolgardie ==
Uhr left the Northern Territory in late 1888 and for the next several years he lived in the more southern states, droving in New South Wales and operating hotels in Sydney and Adelaide. In 1894 he once more followed the Australian gold rush to Western Australia and the town of Coolgardie. Here he went into a butchering partnership with Charles Nunn Kidman, brother of the famous pastoralist, Sidney Kidman. Later he formed the company Butcher and Uhr, which was involved in expanding into pastoral development. Uhr went on expeditions to acquire land in the Laverton region and at Mount Margaret Uhr led a vigilante attack on the local Aboriginals. He was involved in the local horse racing industry and became embroiled in illegal betting syndicates.

Uhr died at Coolgardie in 1907 and was given a lavish public funeral. He was married twice, firstly to Jane Hayes in 1872 and then to Essie Thompson in 1885. As he had not separated from Hayes, Uhr was in a situation of bigamy until 1887 when Hayes died. His grandson, Clive Uhr, would become a noted radiologist and Knight Commander of the Order of the British Empire.
