= Pine Creek, Northern Territory =

Pine Creek
- Town
- Coordinates: 13°49′25″S 131°49′34″E
- Country: Australia
- State: Northern Territory
- LGA: Victoria Daly Region
- Location: 226 km (140 mi) from Darwin; 90 km (56 mi) from Katherine
- Established: 24 January 1889 (town); 3 April 2007 (locality)

Government
  - Territory electorate: Daly
  - Federal division: Lingiari

Population
  - Total: 318 (2021 census)
- Postcode: 0847

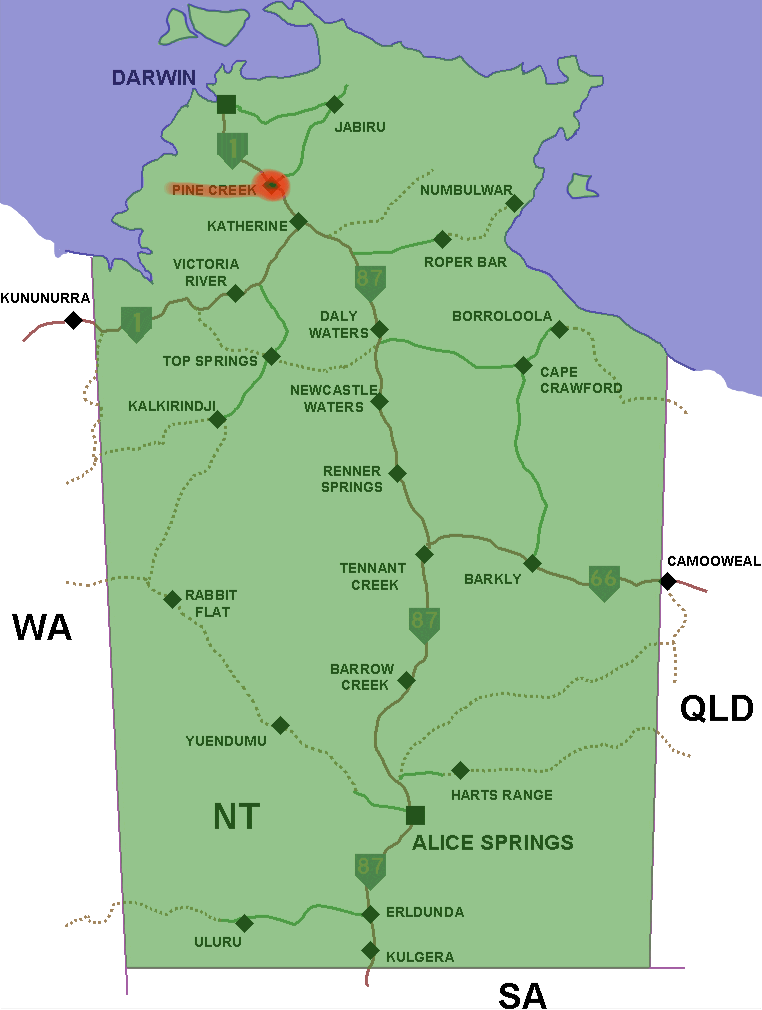
Location of Pine Creek in the Northern Territory (red)

Pine Creek is a small town in the Katherine region of the Northern Territory, Australia. It is situated just off the Stuart Highway, and is 90kms north of Katherine. As at the 2021 Census there were 318 residents, making the town the fourth largest between Darwin and Alice Springs.

The Wagiman, Jawoyn Bolmo, Matjba and Wurrkbarbar groups are the traditional owners of this area and, since 2019, they have held exclusive native title rights over this land.

In 2005 a prominent resident, Edward Ah Toy, was recognised as the Northern Territorian of the year.

== History ==
Pine Creek is one of the oldest towns in the Northern Territory and it is named for the pine trees that once grew by the creek in the centre of the town. Although it was originally and officially called Playford, the name was not in popular use and was officially changed to Pine Creek on 20 September 1973. Of the town, SW Herbert wrote:

"We setled down in our new camp at Pine Creek, since well known throughout Australia, first on account of its being a rich gold field, and years later as the inland terminus of our only railway on the north coast. This creek is by no means large, but was remarkable for pines growing there, thus the name of Pine Creek.".

— SW Herbert, Reminiscences of life in the Northern Territory: 1870-1873

By 1875 there were two hotels, The Royal Mail and The Standard, competing for business. A public school opened in 1899. By the 1890s, as many as 15 mines were operating in the area, and the town's population exceeded 3000 people.

The towns population fluctuated significantly in its early years and declined significantly in the interwar period; one of the few developments in this period was the establishment of the short lived Pine Creek Home between 1931–1933; it was briefly reopened in the early war years 1940–1941 as a place were children who were being transferred from government institutions to church missions.

== Mining ==
Immediately after the construction of the Overland Telegraph Line in 1872, gold was discovered at the Eleanour Reef at Pine Creek by Wentworth D'Arcy Uhr. There is an alternative story in which Darwent & Dalwood found gold while digging holes for the telegraph line, but the government suppressed this as the government did not wish to publicise the discovery to avoid the 'distraction' of a gold rush Despite this, a discovery by Uhr is more widely accepted. (Note: In 1872 a newspaper reported that "A great many statements have been made about gold being found in holes of the telegraph post, and other unimaginable places. Such statements are incorrect, and given out by interested parties." The story of the pole holes as the source of the find perpetuates, although no first-hand accounts have been uncovered to authenticate it.) News of this discovery spread quickly and, by January 1873, 23 mining claims had been taken up and resulted in the creation of the township. It was here that the Northern Territory's first stamp battery was constructed in July 1873.

Chinese miners, mostly from the Kwangtung Province, began arriving in Pine Creek in 1874 and 176 of these were indentured by the South Australian government. In 1877, following the discovery of substantial alluvial gold deposits they began arriving in great numbers. In 1879 a Chinatown was established and the population reached its peak of 900 people. However, this mining boom was short-lived as, by 1882, only 80 miners remained and by 1886 it was virtually inactive.

The boom restarted following the completion of the North Australia Railway to the area in 1889 when many of the Chinese laborers who had been employed on its construction, approximately 3,000 in total, settled in Pine Creek; this included Ah Hong who remained there for a short time. The population of the town in 1894 was 753 Chinese people and 39 'Europeans'. The Chinese migrants, like Aboriginal people, suffered experiences of racism but the traffic of opium, the impact of intensive mining and unequal relationships with Aboriginal women (in which many men did not claim their paternity of children) are methods that parallel with European impacts on Aboriginal people's lives.

There was a cycle of economic growth and decline at Pine Creek but, by 1915. approximately 75,000 ounces (over 2,000 kgs) of gold had been mined there. There is evidence of a thriving Chinese community at Pine Creek until the late 1920s, during The Great Depression which was, soon after, followed by the evacuation of the entire civilian population during World War II and following the Bombing of Darwin and production ceased.

Mining began again, near the town, between 1967 and 1974 where iron ore was mined at Frances Creek, about 25 kilometres north. During this time approximately 6 million tonnes of ore were extracted. In June 2007, Territory Resources (trading under the name Territory Iron) commenced mining iron ore and gold there. In October 2014, the mine was used for filming an episode of the BBC television program Top Gear. The mine ceased operations in January 2015, after a drop in the price of iron ore, leading to the departure of many local employees. In April 2020, it was announced that mining would resume in May 2020, after a 5-year hiatus.

Also, in 1985, Pine Creek Goldfields Limited opened an open-cut gold mine adjacent to the town, on the site of an old shaft mine. Over a ten-year period, it yielded 764,000 ounces (21,700 kg) of gold. Since closure, its main pit has been filled with water to prevent acid build-up. A lookout is located at the south-western end of Moule Street.

== North Australia Railway ==
The first stage of the lightly built narrow-gauge North Australia Railway was built between Port Darwin and Pine Creek, reaching the town in 1889. Additional sidings were added to the rail yards in 1914 in preparation for the extension of the line south to Emungalan (Katherine), which opened in 1917. An unsealed road was constructed in the 1930s, following the same route as the railway from Adelaide River to Larrimah, and passing through Pine Creek. Much of this poorly maintained road would later become the Stuart Highway.

The railway closed in 1976. The old Pine Creek railway station (1888) and some rolling stock remained and were preserved as the Pine Creek Railway Precinct; Commonwealth Railways steam locomotive NF5, built in 1877, was restored to operational condition in 2001.

The North Australia Railway's standard-gauge successor, completed in 2004 between Alice Springs and Darwin – part of the Adelaide–Darwin rail corridor – is used by heavy freight trains and the experiential tourism train, The Ghan; it passes 400 metres (440 yards) east of the town.

== World War II ==
During World War II, the Australian Army set up 65th Australian Camp Hospital near Pine Creek. The Pine Creek Airfield, initially a civilian airfield, was extended between May and July 1942 by the US Army 808th Engineer Aviation Battalion as an emergency landing ground and to serve the military units based in the town. The 43rd Engineer Regiment, of the US Army, with help from the 808th and, later, the Allied Works Council also constructed the nearby MacDonald Airfield (originally known as Burkholder Field). Unlike many Top End towns, Pine Creek was not bombed by the Japanese during the war, although Japanese reconnaissance aircraft are reported to have overflown the town on at least one occasion.

It was also during the war years that sealed, all weather sections of the Stuart Highway were constructed, providing transport alternatives to the railway. Work on the road was completed in this area by 1944.

== Heritage places ==
The following places are listed on the Northern Territory Heritage Register:

- Pine Creek Bakery
- Pine Creek Post Office and Repeater Station
- North Australia Railway (NAR) remnants at Pine Creek
- Old Pine Creek Butchery
- Old Playford Club Hotel
- Old Bonrook Station Homestead
- Pine Creek Railway Precinct, including a railway museum

== Gallery ==
Telegraph Station, Pine Creek in 1879

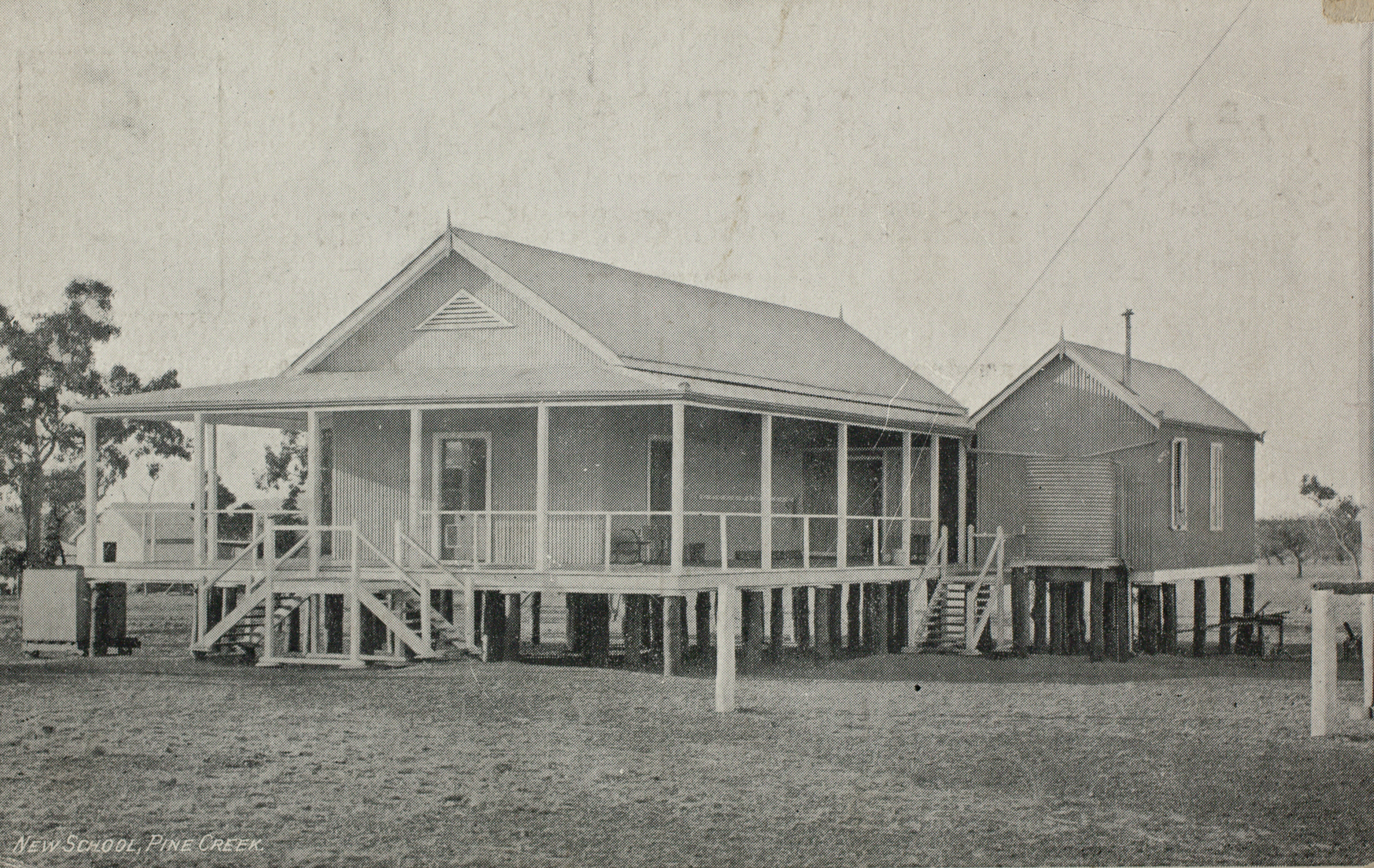
Pine Creek School, 1912

Pine Creek Police Station in the 1920s

Pine Creek Railway Station, 1930

Pine Creek Hotel, c. 1930

Tourist map of Pine Creek, 1992

== Climate ==
According to the Koppen climate classification, Pine Creek experiences a tropical savannah climate (Aw), typical of the Top End region of the Northern Territory.

Climate data for Pine Creek Council, elevation 206 m (676 ft), (2000–2011 normals)
Month	Jan	Feb	Mar	Apr	May	Jun	Jul	Aug	Sep	Oct	Nov	Dec	Year
Record high °C (°F)	37.4 (99.3)	37.1 (98.8)	37.2 (99.0)	37.3 (99.1)	36.1 (97.0)	35.2 (95.4)	35.1 (95.2)	37.0 (98.6)	39.9 (103.8)	41.2 (106.2)	40.4 (104.7)	39.9 (103.8)	41.2 (106.2)
Mean daily maximum °C (°F)	32.9 (91.2)	32.6 (90.7)	33.2 (91.8)	33.7 (92.7)	31.9 (89.4)	29.8 (85.6)	30.6 (87.1)	32.3 (90.1)	35.5 (95.9)	37.0 (98.6)	36.5 (97.7)	34.6 (94.3)	33.4 (92.1)
Mean daily minimum °C (°F)	23.9 (75.0)	23.8 (74.8)	23.4 (74.1)	22.1 (71.8)	19.5 (67.1)	16.7 (62.1)	16.5 (61.7)	17.7 (63.9)	21.6 (70.9)	23.8 (74.8)	24.3 (75.7)	24.2 (75.6)	21.5 (70.6)
Record low °C (°F)	20.4 (68.7)	20.7 (69.3)	16.0 (60.8)	15.4 (59.7)	11.1 (52.0)	9.8 (49.6)	9.8 (49.6)	11.7 (53.1)	13.5 (56.3)	16.7 (62.1)	19.7 (67.5)	20.2 (68.4)	9.8 (49.6)
Average rainfall mm (inches)	333.7 (13.14)	343.4 (13.52)	254.6 (10.02)	85.6 (3.37)	9.7 (0.38)	0.4 (0.02)	0.1 (0.00)	2.6 (0.10)	8.5 (0.33)	36.5 (1.44)	103.1 (4.06)	303.4 (11.94)	1,481.6 (58.32)
Average rainy days (≥ 1.0 mm)	19.2	16.9	14.1	4.2	0.5	0.2	0.0	0.3	1.1	2.9	8.4	16.3	84.1
Source: Australian Bureau of Meteorology
