= Clive Uhr =

Australian radiologist

Sir Clive Wentworth Uhr
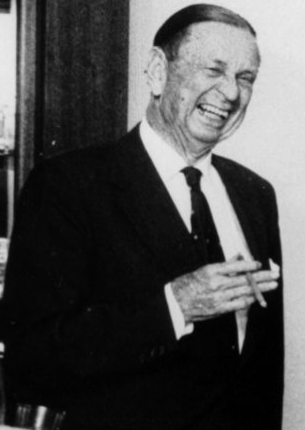
- Clive Uhr at Doomben Racecourse, Queensland
- Born: 1 January 1903; Brisbane, Australia
- Died: 19 September 1974 (aged 71)
- Citizenship: Australian
- Education: University of Sydney
- Occupation: Radiologist
- Spouse: Marie Josephine Barry (m. 1933)
- Children: 7
- Parent: Wentworth Charles Henry Uhr Margaret Cleary

Sir Clive Wentworth Uhr CBE (1 January 1903 – 19 September 1974) was an Australian radiologist. Born in Brisbane to a family of Australian-Irish ancestry, grandson of prospector Wentworth D'Arcy Uhr, Uhr was educated at the University of Sydney. Following graduation he pursued a medical career at the Royal Brisbane Hospital before joining private practice in 1932, and then the Australian Army Medical Corps in 1940.

Quickly promoted to major, Uhr was ordered to Singapore and was on the day of the Japanese invasion of Singapore during World War II. Uhr, an anaesthetist and radiologist during the campaign, was captured. While a prisoner he continued to provide medical care for fellow prisoners with cardiac beriberi, remaining a prisoner of war until the end of hostilities in 1945. In peacetime Uhr remained a staunch supporter of war veterans, marching for the Catholic War Veterans' Association on Anzac Day. He founded, and was a member of, several medical boards in Queensland, including a local branch of the Australian and New Zealand Association of Radiology.

Uhr also entered the world of horse racing, and was chairman of a Queensland racing club. He also donated to colleges of the University of Queensland and stood in local elections. He was made Commander of the Order of the British Empire in 1961 and knighted in 1972.

Uhr died in 1974 and was buried in Nudgee Cemetery.

== See also ==
- Marie Louise Uhr (daughter)
