= Pine Creek Airfield =

- IATA: none; ICAO: none

Summary
- Location: Pine Creek, Northern Territory
- Coordinates: 13°49′30.69″S 131°50′43.64″E

Map
- Location of airport in Northern Territory

Runways
Direction	Length		Surface
Direction	ft	m	Surface
	6,000	1,829	gravel

Pine Creek Airfield was an emergency landing ground at Pine Creek, Northern Territory, Australia during World War II.

Civil airfield extended by B Company and HQ Detachment of the 808th Engineer Aviation Battalion between 11 May 1942 to 16 July 1942. The runway was 6,000 ft × 100 ft (1,829 m × 30 m) wide.

Due to housing development and road and railway construction, the runway length has now been decreased to about 700 m (2,300 ft), with a gravel surface.

== See also ==
- List of airports in the Northern Territory
