= Peter Malam Brothers =

Royal Air Force fighter pilot (1917-2008)

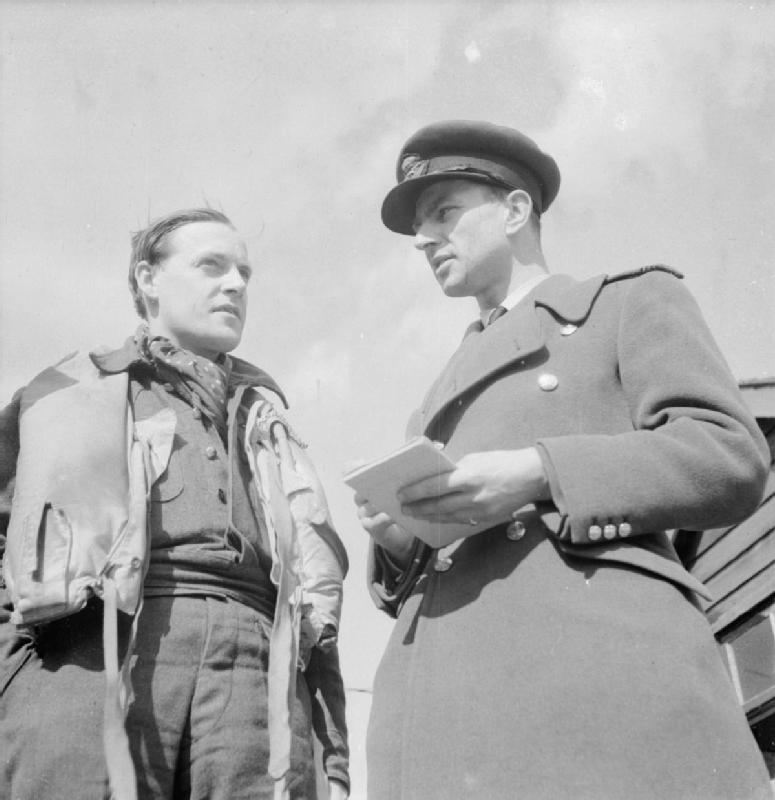
- Peter Brothers (left) in Surrey during the Battle of Britain
- Born: 30 September 1917; Prestwich, Lancashire
- Died: 18 December 2008 (aged 91)
- Military career
- Allegiance: United Kingdom
- Branch: Royal Air Force
- Service years: 1936–1947; 1949–1973
- Rank: Air Commodore
- Commands: No. 457 Squadron RAAF; No. 602 Squadron RAF; No. 57 Squadron RAF; AOC Military Air Traffic Operations; Director of Public Relations (RAF)
- Conflicts: Second World War; Battle of Britain; Malayan Emergency
- Awards: Commander of the Order of the British Empire; Distinguished Service Order; Distinguished Flying Cross & Bar
- Other work: Consultant; Master of the Guild of Air Pilots and Air Navigators; Chairman of the Battle of Britain Fighter Association

Air Commodore Peter Malam Brothers, CBE, DSO, DFC & Bar (30 September 1917 – 18 December 2008) was a Royal Air Force fighter pilot and flying ace of World War II. Brothers was credited with 16 aerial victories, 10 of which he achieved during the Battle of Britain.

== Early life ==
Born in Prestwich, Lancashire, the son of John Malam Brothers, Brothers was educated at North Manchester School. His early interest in flying was shown by learning to fly aged 16. He joined the Royal Air Force in January 1936, and was granted a short service commission as an acting Pilot Officer on probation on 23 March, Joining No 32 Squadron in October 1936, his commission was confirmed on 27 January 1937, and he was promoted to flying officer on 27 October 1938.

== Second World War ==
Brothers first saw action during the Battle of Britain as a flight commander in No 32. Squadron RAF which was then based at RAF Biggin Hill flying Hurricane aircraft. The Battle of Britain was a very busy time for Brothers, and during this time he shot down his first enemy aircraft, a Messerschmitt Bf 109. By the end of August 1940, he was officially recognised as an ace, having shot down eight enemy aircraft. He was awarded the Distinguished Flying Cross for these actions; the citation read:

Air Ministry, 13th September, 1940.

ROYAL AIR FORCE.

The KING has been graciously pleased to approve the undermentioned awards, in recognition of gallantry displayed in flying operations against the enemy:—

Awarded the Distinguished Flying Cross.

[...]

Acting Flight Lieutenant Peter Malan BROTHERS (37668).

During an offensive patrol in August 1940, this officer's flight encountered about one hundred enemy aircraft. He led the flight in attack against them, but before this could be pressed home, he was himself attacked by a number of Messerschmitt 110's. Turning to meet them, he found himself in a stalled position; he spun out of it and immediately sighted and engaged a Dornier 215 which he shot down. Later in the day he destroyed a Messerschmitt 109. Altogether Flight Lieutenant Brothers has destroyed seven enemy aircraft. He has at all times displayed great courage and initiative.

Brothers was promoted substantive Flight Lieutenant on 3 September 1940, and due to the level of losses within 32 Sqn, it was stood down, and on 9 September he was posted to No. 257 Squadron RAF based at RAF Coltishall on 9 September as a Flight Commander under Squadron Leader Robert Stanford Tuck. He was promoted Acting Squadron Leader in 1941 and took command of No. 457 Squadron RAAF in June 1941, and converted to the Spitfire aircraft. He was promoted temporary Squadron Leader on 1 December 1941. A year later when 457 Squadron returned to Australia, Brothers took command of No. 602 Squadron RAF. He became wing leader of the Tangmere Wing in October 1942. He was awarded a Bar to his DFC on 15 June 1943:

Air Ministry, 15th June, 1943.

ROYAL AIR FORCE.

The KING has been graciously pleased to approve the following awards in recognition of gallantry displayed, in flying operations against the enemy: —

[...]

Bar to Distinguished Flying Cross.

Acting Wing Commander Peter Malam BROTHERS, D.F.C. (37668), Reserve of Air Force Officers.

This officer has displayed outstanding keenness and efficiency. Within recent months he has led a wing in many operations and, by his skilful work and personal example, has contributed in a large measure to the high standard of operational efficiency of the formation. He has displayed great devotion to duty.

and the DSO in 1944:

Air Ministry, 3rd November, 1944.

The KING has been graciously pleased to approve the following awards in recognition of gallantry displayed in flying operations against the enemy: —

Distinguished Service Order.

Wing Commander Peter Malam BROTHERS, D.F.C. (37668), R.A.F.O.

Wing Commander Brothers is a courageous and outstanding leader whose splendid example has inspired all. He has led large formations of aircraft on many missions far into enemy territory. Much of the success obtained can be attributed to Wing Commander Brothers brilliant leadership. He has destroyed 13 enemy aircraft.

By 1945, Brothers had flown 875 operational hours and was credited with having shot down 16 enemy aircraft and damaged many more. Despite his record, he was not offered a permanent commission so left the RAF in 1947 and joined the Colonial Service.

== Post-war ==
After two years as a district officer in Kenya, Brothers applied to rejoin the RAF. He was commissioned as a Squadron Leader on 2 June 1949 (with seniority from 5 August 1946), and rather to his surprise was given command of a bomber squadron, No. 57 Squadron RAF, equipped with the Avro Lincoln bomber. He held command from 1950 to 1952, which included the Malayan Emergency campaign (Operation Firedog). He was promoted Wing Commander on 2 July 1952, and after RAF Staff College, Andover he was appointed Wing Commander (Flying) at RAF Marham. There he joined the V bombers, flying the Vickers Valiant jet bombers.

Brothers was promoted to group captain on 1 January 1959, and to Air Commodore on 1 July 1966. After tours including Staff Officer at SHAPE, Director of RAF Operations (Overseas), Air Officer Commanding Military Air Traffic Operations and Director of Public Relations (RAF), he retired in 1973. He was appointed Commander of the Order of the British Empire (CBE) in the 1964 Queen's Birthday Honours.

== Post-RAF life ==
Brothers was best known for his Battle of Britain exploits and was the Chairman of the Battle of Britain Fighter Association for a number of years. He died, aged 91, on 18 December 2008.

Brothers is remembered in a memorial, the ‘Spirit of The Few’ Monument, unveiled on 29 July 2022 at Hawkinge airfield. He is represented as one of seven bronze sculptures of No. 32 Squadron pilots, replicating a photograph taken of the men during the Battle of Britain.

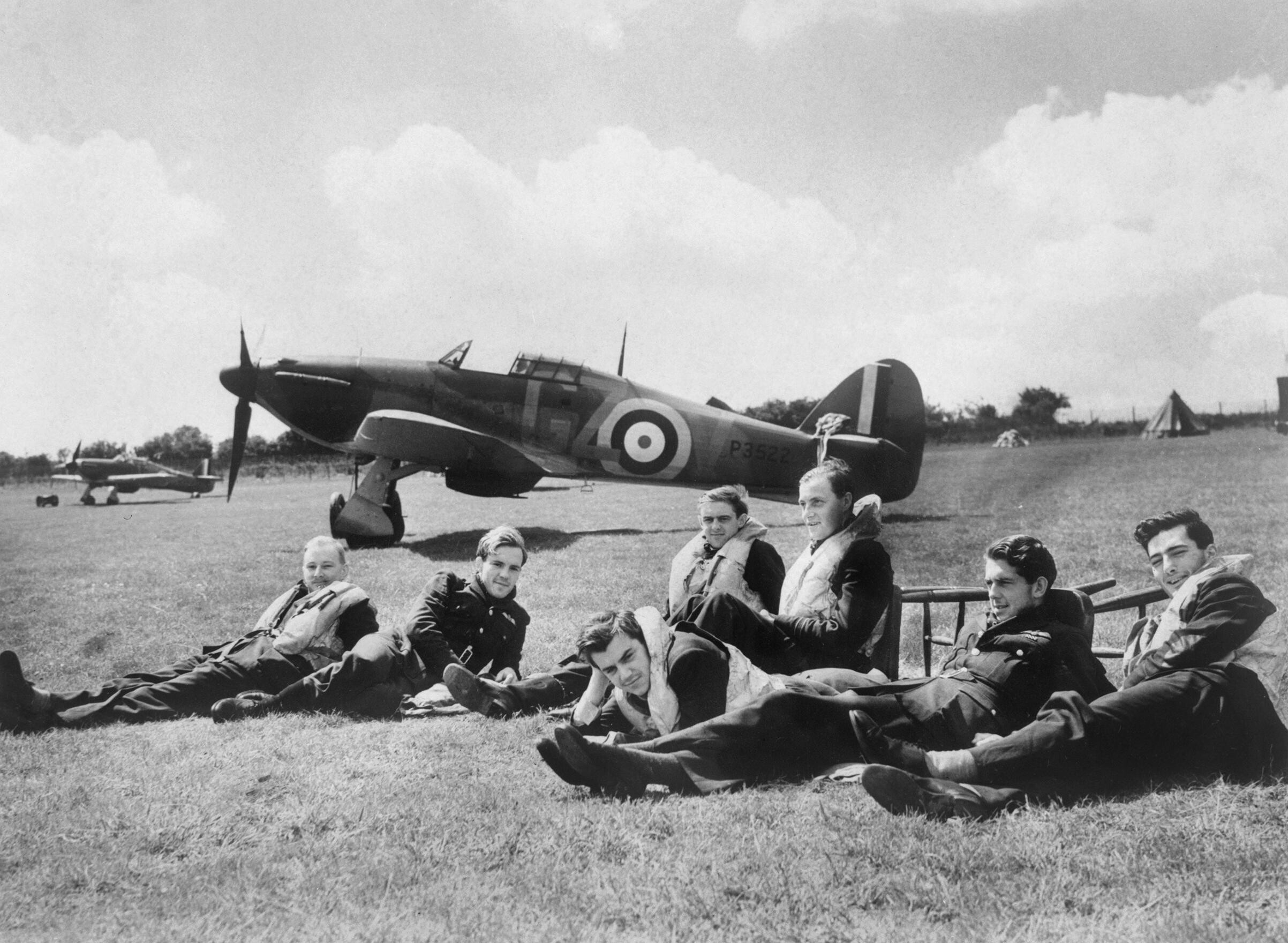
Pilots of 'B' Flight, No. 32 Squadron relax on the grass at Hawkinge in front of a Hawker Hurricane. This photograph is one of a series taken on 29 July 1940 which formed the inspiration for the 'Spirit of The Few' Monument, unveiled in 2022 at Hawkinge. Brothers is third from the right
