= Mungalalu North Kimberley Airport =

Airport in Western Australia

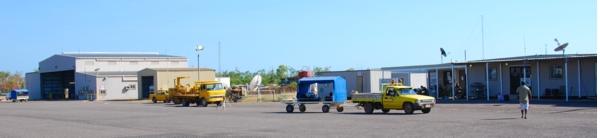
- Mungalalu North Kimberley Airport facilities
- IATA: TTX; ICAO: YTST

Summary
- Airport type: Private
- Owner: Wunambal Gaambera Aboriginal Corporation
- Operator: Norwest Connect
- Location: Anjo Peninsula, Western Australia
- Elevation AMSL: 181 ft (55 m)
- Coordinates: 14°05′23″S 126°22′51″E
- Website: https://norwestconnect.com.au/airport

Map
- Location in Western Australia

Runways
| Direction | Length | | Surface |
| Direction | m | ft | Surface |
|---|---|---|---|
| 12/30 | 1,800 | 5,643 | Asphalt |
- Sources: Australian AIP and aerodrome chart

Mungalalu North Kimberley Airport (MNKA) (IATA: TTX, ICAO: YTST), formerly Mungalalu Truscott Airbase or Truscott-Mungalalu Airport, and which during World War II was known as Truscott Airfield (or usually just simply referred to as Truscott), is a commercial airport in the remote Kimberley region of Western Australia.

Mungalalu North Kimberley Airport is about 281 nautical miles (520 km; 323 mi) west-southwest of Darwin and 333 NM (617 km; 383 mi) northeast of Broome. Located on the Anjo Peninsula in the far north Kimberley district of Western Australia. MNKA occupies 46 km^{2} (18 sq mi) of Aboriginal land.

The airport falls under the traditional custodianship of the Wunambal Gaambera people, who use the traditional name for the area: Mungalalu. The base is currently managed by Norwest Connect and has been registered with the Civil Aviation Safety Authority as a commercial air base since April 2005. Norwest Connect manages MNKA under an agreement with the Wunambal Gaambera Aboriginal Corporation (WGAC). Agreement has been reached with WGAC to sub lease the airfield and base area with licenses for access to certain roads and areas of coastline until 2042.

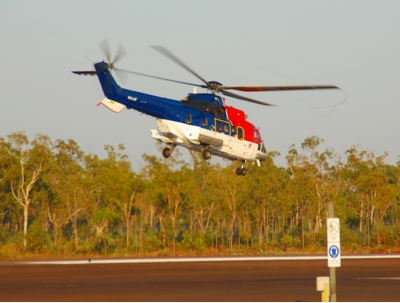
A CHC Helicopters Super Puma helicopter takes off from Mungalalu North Kimberley Airport en route to the off shore oil and gas fields in 2007

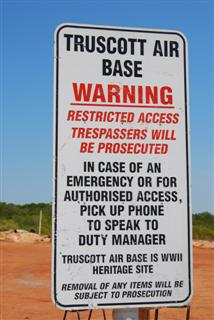
Warning sign at the landing ramp in West Bay which supports the resupply of Mungalalu North Kimberley Airport

== Current operations ==
Today the airport has multiple roles, but primarily that of a staging base for workers on the offshore oil and gas fields in the Timor Sea. In addition it serves as an Aeromedical Retrieval and Search & Rescue (S.A.R.) base from which helicopter operations can be conducted with Critical Care Flight Paramedics on board. Operations include oil & gas companies, RFDS calls and AusSAR activations. Workers are flown into the base by fixed wing aircraft and then transferred to helicopters at MNKA for the final flight leg to offshore facilities in and around the Timor Sea. Currently, three Sikorsky S92 helicopters operated by Babcock Helicopters are based at MNKA. In the recent past there have been up to seven helicopters of varying types operated out of the base by Babcock, Bristow Helicopters and CHC. Other regular users of the base include the Australian Border Force who use the airbase as a staging post for their aerial surveillance patrols in the area. In April 2020 PHI International began operations from MNKA using S92 aircraft to support the Ichthys gas field operated by Inpex.

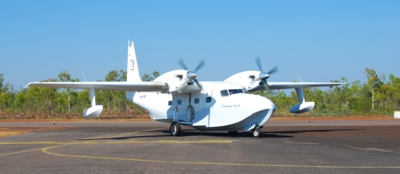
One of the Paspaley Pearl company's Grumman Mallards taxis into Mungalalu North Kimberley Airport to pick up rotating crew transferring to remote pearl farm operations via the flying boats in 2007

Mungalalu North Kimberley Airport is the largest all-weather airbase in the far north Kimberley region. The sealed runway with PAPI lights for night operations is the premier option for companies with business interests in the region. MNKA complies with CASA MoS 139 regulation and allows unrestricted operations for aircraft up to 29 seat capacity. The runway is 1,800 m × 30 m (5,906 ft × 98 ft) with turning nodes, ramps and taxiways. There are two hangars currently (2014) certified by CASA as maintenance hangars, two additional covered storage hangars and a well equipped medical facility. There is camp accommodation with individual rooms for 71 pax and facilities include a shared mess, swimming pool and gymnasium. In past years, numerous aircraft types have utilised the aerodrome; they have included Fairchild Metro 23, Embraer EMB 120 Brasilia, Embraer E-170 and Bombardier Dash 8.

== History ==
=== World War II ===
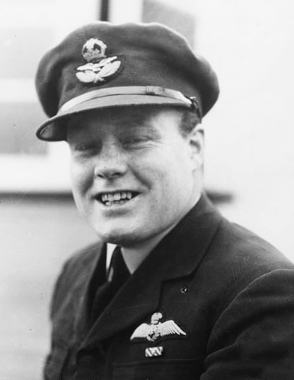
Keith "Bluey" Truscott in 1941

The airfield was originally constructed in 1944 by the RAAF Airfield Construction Unit, under Commanding Officer S/Ldr Trevor Nossiter, as a Royal Australian Air Force (RAAF) base and was actively used during World War II. RAAF Truscott was named after the Australian air ace, Keith "Bluey" Truscott, who had been killed in a training accident in 1943.

The World War II base was built to succeed a temporary base 80 km (50 mi) south at Drysdale River Mission (Kalumburu), and was a staging base for Allied bombers and flying boats, from bases further south, making attacks on Japanese targets in the Dutch East Indies. The site was chosen because it is the point on the Australian mainland closest to Java, where Japanese forces were concentrated. Aircraft from nearby RAAF fighter squadrons (and occasionally RAF units) were rotated through the base to provide air defence for the base.

Construction and the subsequent operations from the base were conducted under total secrecy and the existence of the base was never formally acknowledged until after the war.

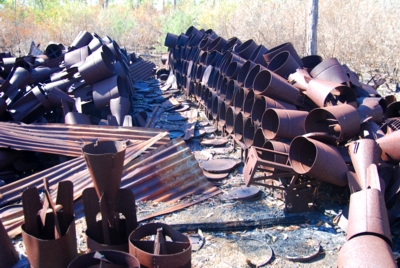
Bomb tail fin assemblies, remnant from World War II at Mungalalu North Kimberley Airport in 2007

The host unit at the base was RAAF 58 Operating Base Unit (58OBU). Australian Army anti-aircraft and searchlight batteries were also based at Truscott scattered around the peninsula. A civilian work unit from the Allied Works Council was based at Truscott for the maintenance of roads around the base and a RAAF Marine Section was stationed in West Bay to support the Catalina Flying Boat operations, operate search and rescue water craft and support the maritime resupply of the air base.

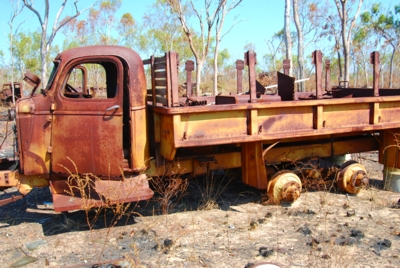
Truscott war relics in 2007

RAAF, Royal Netherlands East Indies Army Air Force (ML-KNIL) and United States Army Air Forces (USAAF) heavy and medium bombers would stage through Truscott, often rearming and refuelling several times on bombing missions into Japanese held areas before returning to their home bases around Western Australia and the Northern Territory.

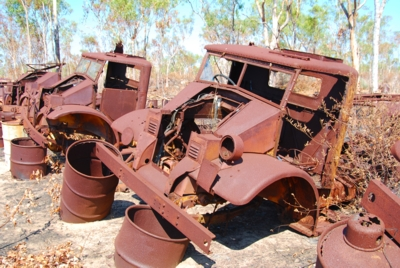
Truscott war relics in 2007

B-24 Liberator heavy bombers and B-25 Mitchell medium bombers were two of the most common airframes to stage through Truscott. Catalina flying boats operated from West Bay and Spitfire aircraft were the most common fighter rotated through the base for local air defence.

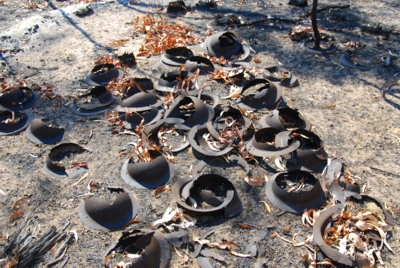
Truscott war relics in 2007

On 18 January 1944, two RAAF personnel, Sergeants Castle and Martin, part of a unit making preparations for construction of the airfield heard a vessel which they suspected was a Japanese submarine or boat. To prevent Japanese forces learning of Truscott's location, they did not investigate. They reported their story to North-Western Area Headquarters who thought that it may have been a Japanese submarine running on the surface to charge its batteries. It was later confirmed that they had heard a Japanese reconnaissance vessel named Hiyoshi Maru, a converted 25 ton fishing boat. Research done after the war has confirmed that Lieutenant Susuhiko Mizuno led a special Japanese Army reconnaissance party from Kupang, in Timor on board the Hiyoshi Maru. The party landed on Browse Island and stayed for about 3 hours. On the next morning they entered an inlet on the Western Australian coast. Three landing parties led by Lieutenant Susuhiko Mizuno, Sergeant Morita and Sergeant Furuhashi, went ashore and explored different areas. They even took some 8 mm movie footage of what they saw. As it turned out they had landed only 25 km (16 mi) from where the RAAF were several weeks later to start building the secret airfield.

On 20 July 1944, a Japanese Mitsubishi Ki-46-II "Dinah" Aircraft, piloted by Lt. Kiyoshi Izuka with his observer Lt. Hisao Itoh was shot down over the Anjo Peninsula by a flight of No. 54 Squadron RAF Spitfires killing both crew. As of September 2007 the remains of the Japanese aircraft was still on the peninsula near the current operating air base. At the end of the war the base was closed down, with it playing a small role as a transit camp for the repatriation of Dutch citizens from the former Netherlands East Indies in 1946.

=== Crashes during World War II ===
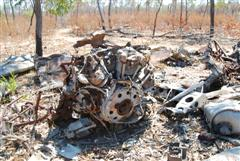
Remnants of Liberator A72-160 as seen at Truscott in 2007

Several significant air accidents occurred during the operation of the base in World War II.

On 16 November 1944, two Spitfires from No. 549 Squadron RAF collided while changing formation in preparation for landing at the base. Warrant Officer Bushell, pilot of Spitfire A58-364, managed to parachute to safety; but W/O Posse, pilot of A58-300 died in the crash. Remnants of both aircraft still exist near the present airstrip.

On 23 March 1945, Liberator A72-80, under the command of Squadron Leader N. H. Straus, crashed shortly after takeoff. Straus found that the plane was unable to climb above about 400 ft (120 m), and turned around at Parry Harbour. He was unable to see the runway, and the aircraft crashed into the sea several kilometres short of Truscott, killing all on board (11 crew, and one passenger). The wreck site was located in 2009.

On 20 May 1945, Liberator A72-160 (a B-24M-10-CO model), on a mission to Balikpapan and piloted by Flight Lieutenant F. L. Sismey, crashed soon after takeoff, near the north west end of the runway. The aircraft was destroyed by its depth charges exploding. All 11 crew members were killed.

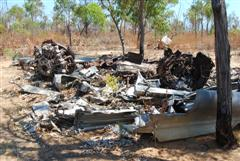
Remnants of Liberator A72-160 as seen at Truscott in 2007

One of the most well known aircraft wrecks at Truscott actually pre-dates the base by two years. On the western side of the air base, in Vansittart Bay, there lies the wreckage of a USAAF Air Transport Command C-53 Skytrooper transport (a variant of the Douglas DC-3; serial number 41-20066). This aircraft made an emergency landing on 26 February 1942, after the pilot got lost while flying from Perth to Broome, and put it down on a salt pan on Anjo Peninsula. The crew and passengers were rescued by a commercial flying boat several days later.

=== Heritage value ===
Mungalalu North Kimberley Airport has been classified and entered into the Council of the National Trust of Western Australia list of Heritage Places due to its significance during World War II and the remaining artefacts. The Trust may nominate Mungalalu North Kimberley Airport for inclusion by the Australian Heritage Council in the Register of the National Estate in the future. The Trust has communicated that the classification has "no legal significance and does not infringe any rights of ownership" leaving administration to the joint understanding of the operator (MT Airbase) and the WGAC.

== See also ==
- List of airports in Western Australia
- Aviation transport in Australia
