= Marie Louise Uhr =

Australian biochemist and Catholic activist (1923–2001)

- Born: July 26, 1923; Brisbane, Australia
- Died: July 28, 2001 (aged 78); Canberra
- Occupation: Biochemist
- Known for: Advocate for the Ordination of Women, Catholic Church

Marie Louise Uhr (26 July 1923 – 28 July 2001) was an Australian biochemist and leader in the movement advocating for the ordination of women in the Catholic Church.

== Early life and education ==
Marie Louise Uhr was born on 26 July 1923 in Brisbane, Queensland, Australia. Her parents were Clive Wentworth Uhr and Marie Uhr. Clive and Marie Uhr had four boys and three girls. Marie was the second-born of the seven children. Her father was a radiologist, and worked at the Royal Brisbane Hospital and in private practice. He served in the Royal Australian Army Medical Corps during World War II. Taken prisoner in Singapore, he remained a prisoner of war until 1945. A devout Catholic, he was active in charity work. In 1960, he earned the "Father of the Year" award in Queensland. In 1961, he was appointed CBE, and he was knighted in 1972.

Uhr attended the University of Queensland, where she earned a bachelor of applied science. Following graduation, she worked for the Commonwealth Serum Laboratories in Melbourne. She completed a Master's degree at the University of Colorado, in the United States. She then earned her PhD at the Australian National University. In 1967, she participated in a post-doctoral program at the University of Wisconsin. Uhr also worked a research fellow at the Australian National University.

== Career ==
A biochemist, Uhr lectured at the Canberra College of Advanced Education, which became the University of Canberra. She published her research in peer-reviews journals, including the Journal of Biological Chemistry. She also wrote on gender bias within the field. She retired from teaching in 1994.

As a feminist, Uhr believed that the Catholic Church should allow women to be ordained as priests. She participated in the Movement for the Ordination of Women (MOW) in the Anglican Church, and was close friends with Patricia Brennan, the founder. She served as national vice-president of MOW from 1989 to 1991. In 1983, Uhr and Zoe Hancock co-founded an organisation called Ordination of Catholic Women Inc., to focus on this issue in Australia. Uhr was the national convener of the organisation from its inception until 2000. The group held its first national conference in 1994, and organised an international conference in 1999.

Uhr decided to pursue theological studies late in life, and earned a Graduate Diploma in Theology from St Mark's National Theological Centre in Canberra.

== Death and legacy ==
On 28 July 2001, Uhr died in Canberra. In 2002, Uhr's family donated her papers to the National Library of Australia.

St. Mark's National Theological Center has established an award in her honour, the Marie Louise Uhr Memorial Award for Theological Excellence.

== Select publications ==
- Uhr, Marie Louise. "Jesus Christ, the Sophia of God: A Symbol of Our Salvation", Women-Church: Australian Journal of Feminist Studies in Religion, no. 19 (1996): 15–21. Digitised version of no. 19 (1996) available on JSTOR Open Community Collections, University of Divinity Digital Collections, Mannix Library
- Uhr, Marie Louise. "Women's Ordination: Barriers and Boundaries", Women-Church: Australian Journal of Feminist Studies in Religion, no. 28 (2001): 11–16. Digitised version of no. 28 (2001) available on JSTOR Open Community Collections, University of Divinity Digital Collections, Mannix Library

== See also ==
- Women's Ordination Movement
