= Batchelor Airfield =

Airport in the Northern Territory, Australia

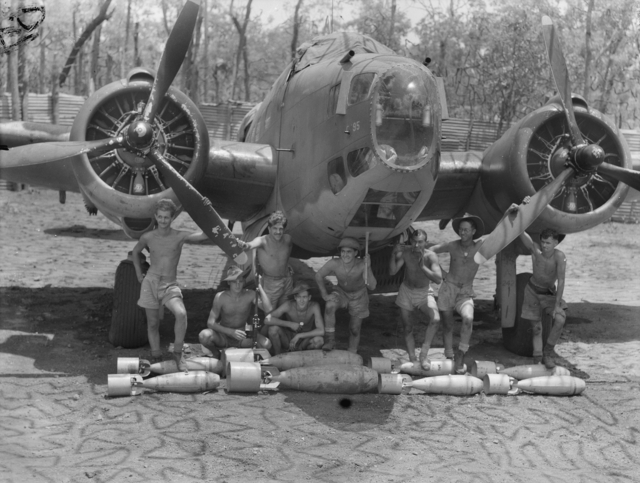
- 2 Squadron RAAF Hudson and personnel Batchelor N.T. Oct 1942
- IATA: none; ICAO: none

Summary
- Location: Batchelor, Northern Territory, Australia
- Built: 1942
- In use: 1942-1945 (Military); 1946-Present (Civil)
- Coordinates: 13°03′21″S 131°1′41″E

Map
- Shown within the Northern Territory Batchelor Airfield (Australia)

Runways
Direction	Length		Surface
Direction	ft	m	Surface
NW/SE

Batchelor Airfield, (ICAO: YBCR) is an airport located south of Batchelor, Northern Territory, Australia. The airport currently has no commercial air services; however, it is utilised by the Northern Australian Gliding Club and the Alice Springs Aero Club as a flight training base.

== History ==
Built during World War II, the airfield accommodated many Royal Australian Air Force (RAAF), United States Army Air Forces and Royal Netherlands East Indies Army Air Force units, flying bombing and escort missions against Japanese positions in the Dutch East Indies and the South-West Pacific.

U.S. Army General MacArthur arrived at Batchelor from Corregidor Island via Mindanao on 17 March 1942 aboard a USAAF Boeing B-17 Flying Fortress, before making his way to Melbourne. During December 1941, the 19th Bombardment Group began reconnaissance and bombardment operations against Japanese shipping and landing parties. By the end of the year, ground personnel joined infantry units defending the Philippines, while the air echelon moved to Batchelor to transport supplies from there to the Philippines and to evacuate personnel. From Batchelor, the unit moved to Java to take part in the defense of the Dutch East Indies, then was reassigned to Brisbane to regroup, resupply and rearm. The 27th Bombardment Group saw action from Batchelor over New Guinea, flying thirteen A-24s to Port Moresby. However, the group suffered heavy losses while in New Guinea. They were withdrawn after it was realised that they were not suited for their intended role without adequate fighter protection and they were desperately in need of adequate workshop facilities and spares backup. The aircraft of the unit was subsequently reassigned to other squadrons and the personnel returned to the United States.

The Americans created their own "tent town" at Batchelor, and tried to make life as comfortable as possible. To keep up with the war a newspaper was mimeographed. There was a hanging bedsheet and projector movie theatre, an agreeable swimming hole in the nearby Adelaide River, and a squadron store which sold any number of interesting items, acquired through questionable means or otherwise. The young American men often ventured into the bush which surrounded their field bivouacs to wonder at the three-metre high, solid mud termite mounds that towered above the scrub floor. Some caught the odd marsupial or exotic bird for pets, but learned early that the small grey bandicoots and kangaroos were impossible to domesticate. The newcomers were warned to be cautious of the venomous snakes in the area. The aboriginals were considered mysterious, although friendly.

Many Americans traded food items for native souvenirs and learned the curious pidgin English that flavoured the aboriginal dialect. They also swapped cigarettes for fresh fruit and wild yams to improve their lacklustre diet, but few Americans could tolerate the flesh of the lizards, snakes, fish and flying foxbats that their native hosts considered delicacies. Some learned of the shotguns supplied to their armament section and requisitioned these for bird hunting to enhance their meals. VIPs were sometimes surprised by a full course roast duck banquet, made possible by various marksmen. Life was not always completely mysterious to the newcomer Americans. The contesting Aussies shared a genuine camaraderie with their common love of sport. American baseball diamonds were scraped in the sand at every unit location and the Aussie sportsmen even went so far as to contest them at their own game.

Most operational units in early 1945 had moved further north whereby administrative units occupied the field until January 1946 when the military use of the airfield ended.

=== Units based at Batchelor ===
- No. 12 Squadron RAAF
- No. 34 Squadron RAAF
- No. 18 (Netherlands East Indies) Squadron RAAF
- United States Army Air Forces, Fifth Air Force

19th Bombardment Group, (24–30 December 1941) Boeing B-17 Flying Fortress, Consolidated B-24 Liberator
27th Bombardment Group (Light), (March-4 May 1942) Douglas A-24 Dauntless
7th Fighter Squadron (49th Fighter Group), (9 April-19 September 1942) Lockheed P-38 Lightning

Dispersed from group headquarters at RAAF Base Darwin

78th Bombardment Squadron (38th Bombardment Group), (30 April-12 August 1942) North American B-25 Mitchell

Dispersed from group headquarters at Eagle Farm Airport, Qld

== Current use ==
Today there are some hangars used by the flying club, and some aircraft parking aprons. The main NW-SE runway is in good repair, and what appears to be a remnant of a parallel taxiway is visible in aerial photographs. The original E-W runway is gone although traces of it can be seen on aerial photos. Some wartime taxiways and hardstands remain to the south, along with the remnants of Gould airstrip, all of which are in a poor state of repair. The roads of the wartime containment area exist, now being the streets of the town, although none of the wartime buildings, or facilities have survived.

== See also ==
- United States Army Air Forces in Australia (World War II)
- List of airports in the Northern Territory
