= Sattler Airfield =

- Bees Creek, Northern Territory, Australia Sattler Airfield (Northern Territory)

Site information
- Type: Military airfield

Location
- Coordinates: 12°32′40″S 131°03′40″E

Site history
- In use: 1942–1945

Sattler Airfield is an abandoned airfield in the Northern Territory of Australia that was constructed 32 km (20 mi) to the south of Darwin during World War II in what is now the locality of Bees Creek. It was named after Flight Lieutenant Geoffrey Sattler, the commander of a Lockheed Hudson A16-7, who died on 12 January 1942 at Keema Bay, North Celebes with the rest of his crew. On 2 April 1942, the then new Sattler RAAF airfield was bombed by the Japanese Imperial Forces. There was minimal damage. There were no Allied planes at the base as it was still under construction.

== See also ==
- List of airports in the Northern Territory
