= Strauss Airfield =

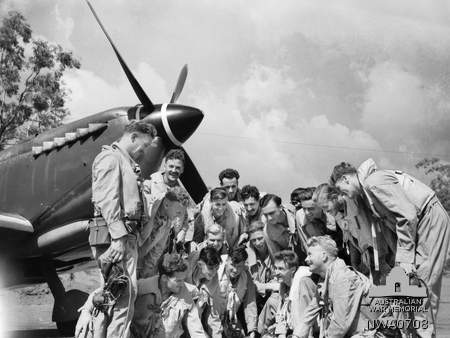
- Pilots of No. 452 Squadron RAAF being briefed by the Commanding Officer, Squadron Leader L. T. (Lou) Spence, circa December 1944 (right, kneeling)
- IATA: none; ICAO: none

Summary
- Location: Noonamah, Northern Territory
- Coordinates: 12°39′31.7″S 131°04′39.6″E

Map
- Location of airport in Northern Territory

Runways
Direction	Length		Surface
Direction	ft	m	Surface
	5,000	1,524

Strauss Airfield was an airfield in the Northern Territory of Australia in the locality of Noonamah constructed between 19 March to 27 April 1942 during World War II. It was also known as 27 Mile Field or Humpty Doo Strip.

== History ==
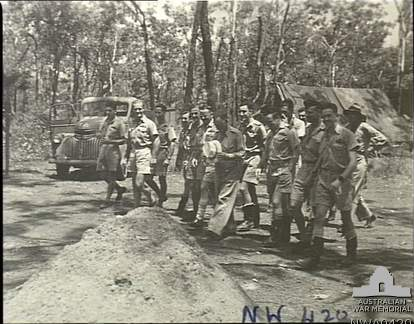
Arthur Drakeford, Minister for Air and Civil Aviation, on a tour of No. 76 Squadron RAAF, May 1942

Constructed by sections of the United States Army 808th Engineer Aviation Battalion, they built a single runway of 5,000 ft × 100 ft (1,524 m × 30 m) wide with associated taxiways and dispersals.

The airfield was officially dedicated as Strauss Field in memory and honour of United States Captain Allison W. Strauss who was killed piloting a P-40 Kittyhawk from the 8th Pursuit Squadron ("The Blacksheep") of the 49th Fighter Group after crashing into Darwin harbour during a Japanese air raid on the Darwin RAAF airfield on 27 April 1942.

On 13 October 2003, the Strauss Airfield was added to the Northern Territory Heritage Register.

== Japanese Bombing Raids against Strauss Airfield ==
- 26 November 1942 (03.20 am)
- 27 November 1942 (03:56 – 04:46 am)

== Units based at Strauss Airfield ==
- No. 76 Squadron RAAF (P-40)
- No. 452 Squadron RAAF (Spitfire)
- No. 457 Squadron RAAF (Spitfire)

== See also ==
- List of airports in the Northern Territory
