= Parap Airfield =

- IATA: none; ICAO: none

Summary
- Location: Parap, Northern Territory
- Opened: 1919
- Closed: 1946
- Coordinates: 12°25′47″S 130°50′31″E

Map
- Location of airport in Northern Territory

Parap Airfield was the civilian aerodrome of Darwin, Northern Territory, in Australia between 1919 and 1946. Located in the coastal suburb of Parap, it was also known as Darwin Aerodrome and Ross Smith Aerodrome.

== History ==
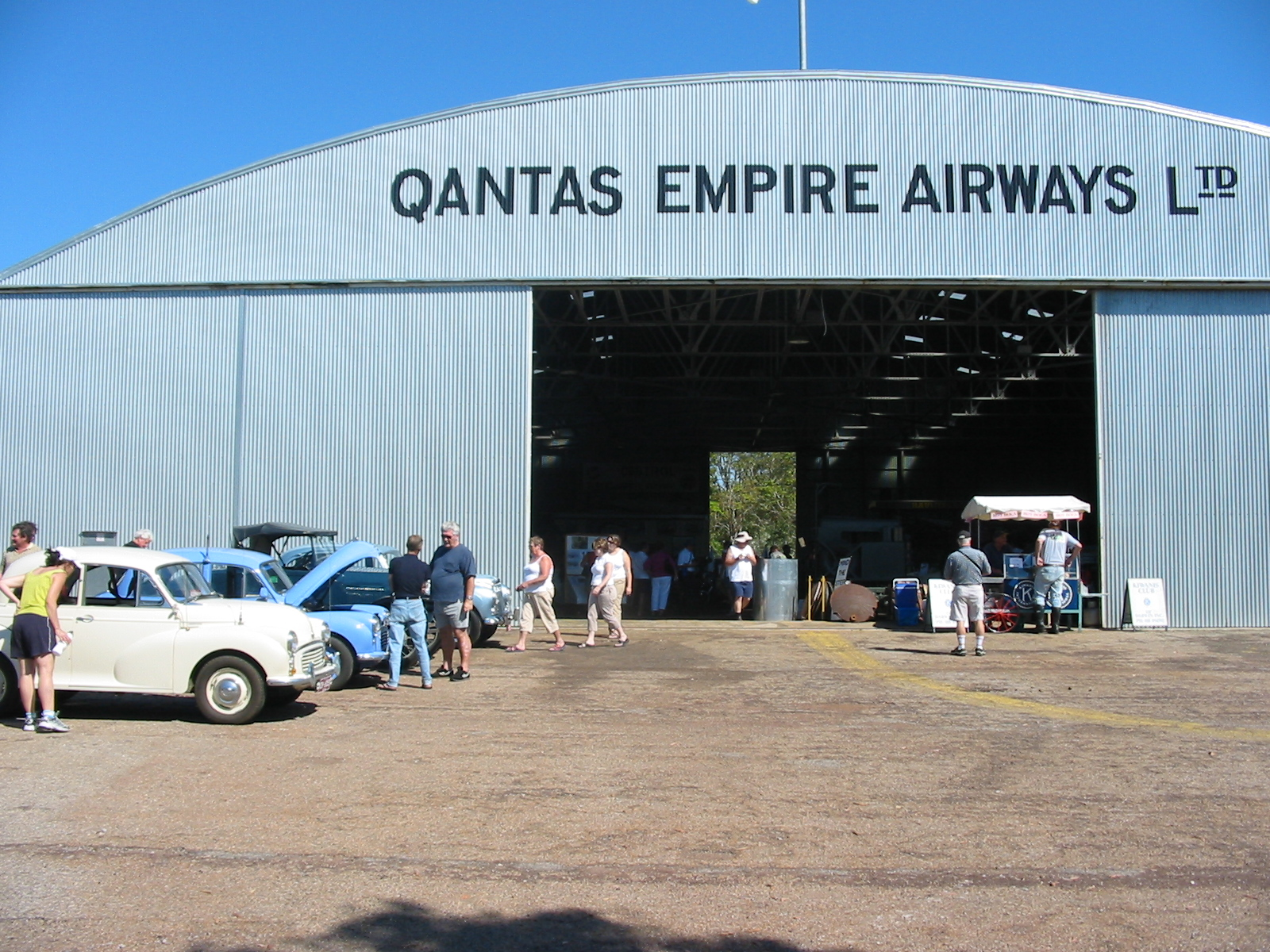
Former Parap Airfield hangar (2004)

The airfield was established in the suburb of Parap to act as the Australian Terminal as part of the 1919 England to Australia air race. It operated as a combined civilian and military airfield.

The Royal Australian Air Force (RAAF) deployed its No. 12 Squadron to the aerodrome in September 1939 after the declaration of war against Germany and amidst increasing suspicion regarding Japanese imperialism. By early 1942, the aerodrome was mainly used by the RAAF, although Guinea Airways retained a civilian presence. No. 34 Squadron RAAF was formed on 23 February 1942 at the aerodrome.

The Japanese bombed the aerodrome in a number of raids on Darwin during 1942, resulting in extensive damage to the town and hangar. The hangar was extensively damaged after suffering a direct hit and the damage can still be seen in the north-east corner of the original steel frame.

No. 6 Communications Flight RAAF was based at the aerodrome from August 1942 and delivered mail and food supplies to army and RAAF outposts, as far afield as the Wessel Islands.

In 1945, the Department of Aviation made RAAF Darwin available for shared civil aviation purposes and as a result, the civilian airport at Parap was closed down by the end of 1946.

== Airfield details ==
The main runway was in the location of present-day Ross Smith Avenue, in the suburb of Parap.

== See also ==
- List of airports in the Northern Territory
