= North-Western Area Command =

Royal Australian Air Force command

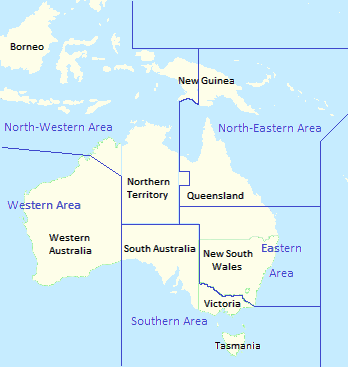
- RAAF area commands in November 1942
- Active: 1942–1955
- Allegiance: Australia
- Branch: Royal Australian Air Force
- Role: Air defence Aerial reconnaissance Protection of adjacent sea lanes Attacks on Japanese bases and shipping
- Garrison/HQ: Darwin, Northern Territory
- Engagements: World War II

Commanders
- Notable commanders: Douglas Wilson (1942); Frank Bladin (1942–43); Adrian Cole (1943–44); Alan Charlesworth (1944–46); Frank Headlam (1946); Glen Cooper (1952–53)

North-Western Area Command was one of several geographically based commands raised by the Royal Australian Air Force (RAAF) during World War II. Its wartime sphere of operations included the Northern Territory, adjacent portions of Queensland and Western Australia, and the Dutch East Indies. The command was formed in January 1942, following the outbreak of the Pacific War, from the western part of Northern Area Command, which had covered all of northern Australia and Papua. Headquartered at Darwin, North-Western Area Command was initially responsible for air defence, aerial reconnaissance and protection of the sea lanes within its boundaries.

In the official history of the RAAF in the Pacific theatre, George Odgers described the North-Western Area Campaign as "almost entirely an air war, with raid and counter-raid". From 1943, North-Western Area Command's role became increasingly offensive in nature, as the Allies began to advance in New Guinea and the Dutch East Indies. Its combat aircraft ranged from single-engined fighters to heavy bombers, and were flown by Australian, British, American and Dutch squadrons. The area command continued to operate following the end of the war, but its assets and staffing were much reduced. Its responsibilities were subsumed in February 1954 into the RAAF's new functional commands: Home (operational), Training, and Maintenance Commands. The area headquarters was disbanded the following year.

== History ==
=== World War II ===
==== Formation ====
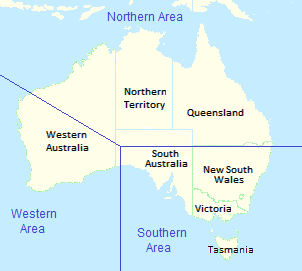
RAAF area commands in December 1941

North-Western Area Command was formed at RAAF Station Darwin, Northern Territory, on 15 January 1942, taking over the western portion of what was Northern Area Command. Northern Area had been established on 8 May 1941 as one of the RAAF's four geographically based command-and-control zones, and covered northern New South Wales, Queensland, the Northern Territory, and Papua. The roles of the area commands were air defence, protection of adjacent sea lanes, and aerial reconnaissance. Each was led by an Air Officer Commanding (AOC) responsible for the administration and operations of air bases and units within his boundary.

The outbreak of the Pacific War in December 1941 was the catalyst for Northern Area being split into North-Western Area (NWA) and North-Eastern Area (NEA), to counter distinct Japanese threats to Northern Australia and New Guinea, respectively. NWA's inaugural AOC was Air Commodore Douglas Wilson. His senior air staff officer was Group Captain Frederick Scherger. Headquarters staff numbered 137, including 24 officers.

On 15 January 1942, an Allied supreme command for South East Asia and the South West Pacific, American-British-Dutch-Australian Command (ABDACOM), was formed with headquarters at Bandung in Java. Five days later, the Australian War Cabinet officially transferred the operational control of northern Australia between Onslow in Western Australia and the south-east edge of the Gulf of Carpentaria to ABDACOM. The Darwin area become an Allied air sub-command known as AUSGROUP, under ABDACOM's air component, ABDAIR. Following reports on 27 January that the formidable Japanese combined carrier fleet had entered the Flores Sea, Wilson ordered the dispersal of assets at RAAF Darwin. Repair and maintenance equipment and staff were moved to Daly Waters, almost 300 miles (480 km) further south, but when Wilson also directed that five obsolescent CAC Wirraway armed trainers move to Daly Waters, he was overruled by the Deputy Chief of Air Staff, Air Vice Marshal William Bostock. In early February 1942, Air Commodore George Jones, soon to be appointed Chief of the Air Staff, inspected NWA and found the morale and serviceability of its combat units—Nos. 2, 12 and 13 Squadrons—to be lacking.

==== 1942–1943: Raids and counter-raids ====
On 19 February 1942, NWA's complement of aircraft included seventeen Lockheed Hudson light bombers of Nos. 2 and 13 Squadrons based at Darwin and Daly Waters, fourteen Wirraways of No. 12 Squadron based at Darwin and Batchelor, and ten P-40 Kittyhawk fighters of the United States Army Air Forces (USAAF) that were transitting through Darwin to Java. Half of the Hudsons were without crews, five of the Wirraways were out of service, and the Kittyhawk pilots were considered inexperienced. Wilson was attending meetings at ABDACOM headquarters in Java, and Scherger was acting AOC. Just before 10 am, Darwin suffered its first air raid by the Japanese, a force of 188 aircraft that bombed the harbour and town. A further attack by fifty-four bombers, directed mainly at the RAAF airfield, followed at around midday. The raids on 19 February destroyed civil and military infrastructure, twenty-three aircraft and ten ships, and killed approximately 250 people; 278 RAAF personnel deserted Darwin in an exodus that became known as the "Adelaide River Stakes". "There was", in Scherger's words, "an awful panic and a lot of men simply went bush". The Kittyhawks and anti-aircraft gunners were credited with shooting down five Japanese aircraft and probably destroying five others.

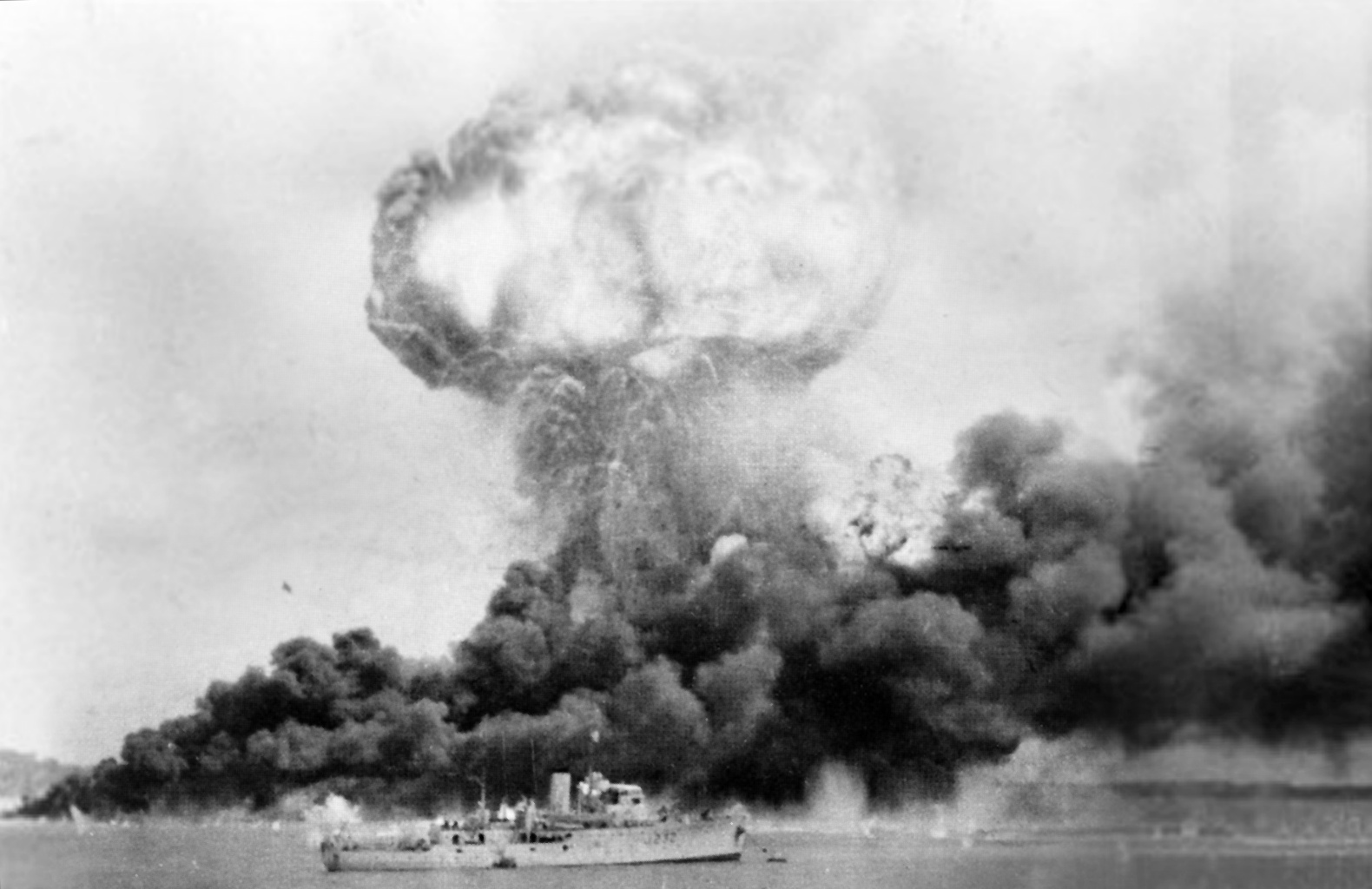
Explosion of an oil storage tank during the first air raid on Darwin, 19 February 1942

In the wake of the disaster, NWA headquarters moved to a bush camp south of the RAAF Station, and the senior leadership was changed. Wilson and Scherger were posted out, the latter in spite of being praised for his actions during the attack by the Federal government's commission of inquiry. ABDACOM was dissolved on 25 February, following the collapse of Allied resistance in Malaya and the Dutch East Indies. Air Commodore Frank Bladin took over as AOC NWA on 25 March, his initial objectives being to restore morale and deal with the perceived threat of an imminent invasion, tasks complicated by poor communications, transport and early warning systems. Proceeding to instigate more intense combat training and construct new satellite airfields with which to disperse his forces, Bladin became, in the words of Air Force historian Alan Stephens, "the RAAF's outstanding area commander of the war", and the first Australian in the Pacific theatre to be decorated by the Americans when he was awarded the Silver Star for gallantry after personally leading a raid by USAAF B-17 Flying Fortresses on Celebes in the Dutch East Indies. Despite northern Australia's obvious vulnerability to attack, NWA was without a garrison of interceptors until the arrival in March and April of three squadrons of USAAF Kittyhawks comprising the 49th Pursuit Group (soon redesignated the 49th Fighter Group) under the command of Colonel Paul Wurtsmith. The Darwin area suffered sixty-four air raids between February 1942 and November 1943.

As of 20 April 1942, operational authority over all RAAF combat infrastructure, including area commands, was invested in the newly established Allied Air Forces (AAF) Headquarters under South West Pacific Area Command (SWPA). NWA's boundaries were fine-tuned in August: as well as covering the Northern Territory, the command took responsibility for the portion of Western Australia north of a line drawn south-east from Yampi Sound to the Northern Territory border, and part of Queensland adjacent to the Barkly Tableland. The 49th Fighter Group flew its final sorties in August and transferred to New Guinea the following month, having claimed seventy-nine Japanese aircraft destroyed for the loss of twenty-one Kittyhawks. NWA's two Hudson squadrons had meanwhile conducted unescorted bombing missions against Japanese bases and shipping in the Timor and Arafura Seas, and in support of Sparrow Force on Timor. Three RAAF fighter squadrons—Nos. 76 and 77 equipped with Kittyhawks and No. 31 equipped with Bristol Beaufighters—arrived in September and October. September also saw the formation of RAAF Command under Bostock, to oversee the majority of Australian flying units in the SWPA. Bostock exercised overall control of air operations through the area commands, although RAAF Headquarters continued to hold administrative authority over Australian units. Bladin's remit was to defend the Northern Territory, the northern coast of Western Australia, and the Torres Strait, protecting the flank of General Douglas MacArthur's offensives in New Guinea. Bostock was to coordinate operations when they involved more than one area command, for instance when the fighter squadrons of both NWA and NEA were required to repulse a major attack.

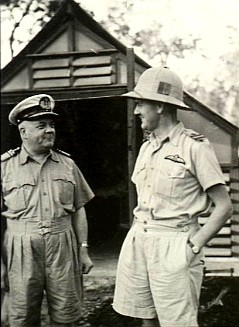
Air Commodore Bladin (right) as AOC NWA, with a Dutch officer, 1943

By December 1942, NWA's flying units included six RAAF squadrons operating mainly Kittyhawks, Beaufighters, Hudsons, and Vultee Vengeance dive bombers, as well as No. 1 Photographic Reconnaissance Unit, which flew Wirraways, Brewster Buffalos, P-38 Lightnings and P-43 Lancers, and operated out of the Darwin area (as No. 87 Squadron from September 1944) for the rest of the war. These units were soon augmented by one squadron each of Australian-Dutch East Indies B-25 Mitchell medium bombers and USAAF B-24 Liberator heavy bombers, with which NWA was able to conduct heavier strikes against Japanese forces north of Australia. Also in December, No. 34 (Transport) Squadron, which had been formed under NWA's control in Darwin four days after the first air raid, transferred its aircraft to the newly formed No. 6 Communications Unit, which remained in the Northern Territory until disbanding shortly after the end of hostilities. No. 44 RDF Wing was formed under NWA at their Advanced HQs at 57 Mile near Coomalie Creek on 14 December. It was responsible for the radar stations that provided early warning of Japanese attacks. The wing coordinated air defence in the region with No. 5 Fighter Sector Headquarters.

As raids continued into 1943, Bladin placed his bombers inland and his fighters close to the coast, where they could intercept the attackers. No. 61 (Works) Wing was responsible for airfield construction squadrons and their support units. Works squadrons constructed or improved airfields at Cooomalie, Millingimbi, Fenton, Long, and Darwin. According to historian Chris Coulthard-Clark, NWA was "one of the few areas where the RAAF was free to run its own show" in World War II. Bladin often employed his own judgement in selecting targets for offensive strikes, as detailed directives from superior headquarters were not always forthcoming. On 27 February, acting on intercepted radio transmissions, he launched a raid on Penfui airfield near Koepang, destroying or damaging twenty-two Japanese bombers that were expected to make a major raid on Darwin.

To help protect northern Australia from ongoing air attack, three squadrons of Supermarine Spitfire fighters were transferred from the United Kingdom and became operational in March 1943 as No. 1 Fighter Wing RAAF under Group Captain Allan Walters. A major engagement over Darwin on 2 May resulted in the loss of five Spitfires during combat, and several others in forced landings owing to fuel starvation or engine failure, for the destruction of one Japanese bomber and five fighters. Bladin immediately ordered a retaliatory Beaufighter strike led by Wing Commander Charles Read against Penfui airfield, on the assumption—which proved to be correct—that this was where the Japanese raiders were based; four enemy aircraft were destroyed on the ground. Between March and May 1943, the number of sorties flown by NWA's combat squadrons rose from 211 to 469. The Allies claimed a total of forty-six Japanese aircraft destroyed for the loss of thirty of their own on operations, seventeen to enemy action and thirteen from other causes. On 17 June, under the command of Group Captain Clive Caldwell, No. 1 Wing recorded NWA's most successful interception to date, claiming fourteen Japanese raiders destroyed and ten damaged, for the loss of two Spitfires. The same month, the USAAF's 380th Bombardment Group, consisting of four squadrons of Liberators, came under NWA's control, enhancing its strategic strike capability. By this time, NWA headquarters staff numbered 385, including 96 officers.

==== 1943–1945: Offensive operations ====
Bladin handed over NWA to Air Vice Marshal Adrian Cole in July 1943. Cole reported that the command was "well organised, keen and in good shape", but considered its air defence capability inadequate, recommending augmentation by long-range fighters such as Lightnings. He nevertheless had to make do with the three Spitfire squadrons of No. 1 Fighter Wing, and the possibility of calling on the USAAF's Fifth Air Force for reinforcements as necessary. Having started out as a primarily defensive command, by mid-1943 NWA was able to support Allied advances in New Guinea. As well as the protection of Northern Australia, the command was responsible for attacking Japanese bases and shipping. During August and September, Cole reduced regular reconnaissance missions to maximise his bombing effort, following a request from MacArthur to provide all available support for Allied assaults on Lae–Nadzab; NWA Liberators, Hudsons, Beaufighters and PBY Catalinas carried out raids to destroy Japanese bases and aircraft, and divert enemy forces from Allied advances. No. 79 Wing was established under the aegis of NWA at Batchelor on 30 November 1943. Consisting of four attack squadrons flying Bristol Beauforts, Mitchells and Beaufighters, it was commanded by Group Captain Charles Eaton.

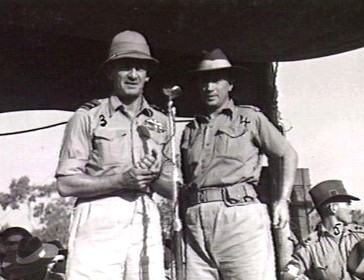
Air Vice Marshal Cole (left) as AOC NWA, at Adelaide River, Northern Territory, September 1943

By December 1943, the character of the air war in northern Australia had changed markedly, as the Japanese were no longer able to mount air raids against Darwin; rather than merely securing NWA, Cole was keen to adopt an offensive strategy in the Dutch East Indies. According to David Horner, "In the sense that he had to plan and conduct his own campaign, the AOC Northwestern Area was one of the RAAF's few operational level commanders, even if the campaign was somewhat static and limited". During March and April 1944, NWA controlled thirteen squadrons, including those of No. 79 Wing, and supported amphibious operations against Hollandia and Aitape. No. 61 Wing was ordered to build a 10,000-foot (3,000 m) runway at Darwin to accommodate USAAF B-29 Superfortress heavy bombers for operations against oil refineries in Balikpapan, but the deployment never went ahead.

NWA's aircraft bombed Surabaya as part of Operation Transom in May 1944. No. 79 Wing took part in the Allied attack on Noemfoor in June and July; sorties by all NWA aircraft in July totalled 704. No. 79 Wing was subsequently earmarked for transfer from NWA to Northern Command (formerly No. 9 Operational Group) in Papua New Guinea, to undertake operations against the Japanese in New Britain. No. 1 Wing received two fresh British squadrons of Spitfires in July, to replace two Australian squadrons that had been transferred to No. 80 Wing, which had formed in Darwin for a planned assault on Selaru that did not eventuate. No. 44 Wing was disbanded on 22 August 1944, and its radar stations transferred to other units in the area. The same month, No. 61 Wing departed the Northern Territory for Morotai Island, where it later came under the control of the RAAF's main mobile strike force, First Tactical Air Force.

In September 1944, Cole handed NWA over to Air Commodore Alan Charlesworth. At this stage of the war, the Allies were advancing north and the tempo of operations in the Darwin area had decreased. Group Captain Peter Jeffrey led No. 1 Wing to the Tanimbar Islands and strafed targets in Selaru, but told Caldwell that he considered the raid a wasted effort and had only undertaken it to boost the spirit of his pilots. Charlesworth raised concerns regarding No. 80 Wing, warning higher command that its morale would drop if it was not either given a more active role in the war or transferred to southern Australia for rest. By October, the wing had received orders to depart NWA for Morotai to join the First Tactical Air Force; this left NWA with twelve squadrons at its disposal, including one Liberator unit and three other Spitfire squadrons. In the meantime, NWA supported the assault on Leyte with attacks on ports, oil facilities, and shipping in the Dutch East Indies using Beaufighters, Mitchells, and Liberators. These operations continued through November and December. No. 31 Squadron transferred from Coomalie to the First Tactical Air Force on Morotai in December. By then, NWA headquarters staff numbered 651, including 156 officers.

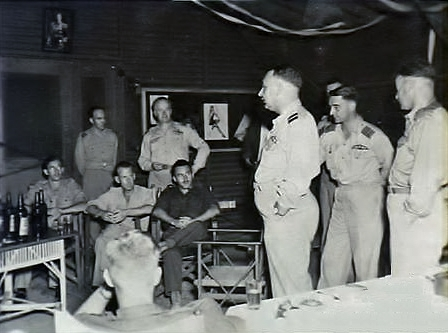
Air Vice Marshal Charlesworth (centre) as AOC NWA and Group Captain Headlam (second right) welcome repatriated POWs to Darwin, September 1945

The same month Charlesworth assumed command, No. 76 Wing arrived from Cairns, Queensland, to coordinate and control minelaying operations in NWA by three Catalina squadrons. The Catalinas mined Manila Bay in December 1944, to support the Allied landing at Mindoro. No. 82 (Heavy Bomber) Wing—the RAAF's first—became operational under NWA's control at Fenton Airfield on 11 January 1945. Comprising two Liberator squadrons, the wing replaced the USAAF's 380th Group when the latter was transferred to the Fifth Air Force in the Philippines. The Liberators of No. 82 Wing sank seven Japanese ships in the Dutch East Indies during March. On 6 April, all of its available aircraft joined Mitchells of No. 79 Wing in an assault on a Japanese convoy that included the cruiser Isuzu. Anti-aircraft fire and attacks by enemy fighters resulted in the loss of two Liberators; Allied submarines sank the damaged Isuzu the following day.

Another squadron of Liberators was added to No. 82 Wing's strength in late-April 1945. The bombers attacked targets in Java in the lead-up to Operation Oboe One, the invasion of Tarakan, which commenced on 1 May. During this and the two subsequent Oboe operations, the invasions of Labuan and Balikpapan, NWA was responsible for mining operations, convoy escort, aerial reconnaissance, and attacks on Japanese bases and troops. No. 76 Wing's Catalinas mined harbours as far north as Hong Kong and the Gulf of Hainan, China. By July, NWA had been denuded of much of its offensive capability as Nos. 79 and 82 Wings had been transferred to the First Tactical Air Force in Morotai. No. 85 Wing was formed the same month under NWA's control; it comprised two Liberator squadrons but only one became operational before the end of the Pacific War.

=== Post-war activity and disbandment ===
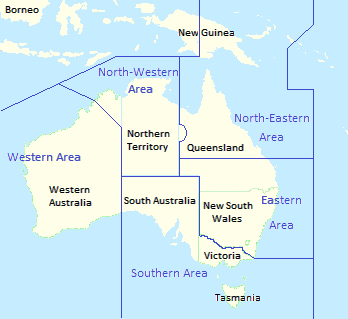
RAAF area commands in 1947; the geographical boundaries remained in place until superseded by a functional control system commencing in 1953

On 2 September 1945, following the end of the Pacific War, South West Pacific Area was dissolved and the RAAF again assumed full control of all its operational elements. The Air Force shrank dramatically as personnel were demobilised and units disbanded; most of the RAAF's bases and aircraft employed in operations after the war were situated within Eastern Area's sphere of control in New South Wales and southern Queensland. Darwin's Liberator and Catalina squadrons were mainly used for repatriating Australian prisoners of war. No. 76 and 85 Wings were disbanded in November. Darwin would subsequently function mainly as a transit centre and a base for peacetime exercises, rather than as a permanent station for flying squadrons. Charlesworth continued to serve as AOC NWA until January 1946, when Group Captain Frank Headlam, formerly NWA's senior administrative staff officer, took over as officer commanding (OC). Headlam remained in command until October, by which time the headquarters staff numbered 108, including 23 officers.

In September 1946, the Chief of the Air Staff, Air Vice Marshal George Jones, proposed reducing the five extant mainland area commands (North-Western, North-Eastern, Eastern, Southern, and Western Areas) to three: Northern Area, covering Queensland and the Northern Territory; Eastern Area, covering New South Wales; and Southern Area, covering Western Australia, South Australia, Victoria and Tasmania. The Australian Government rejected the plan and the wartime area command boundaries essentially remained in place.

Between October 1949 and February 1950, NWA hosted its largest exercise since the war when No. 82 Wing Avro Lincolns, specially modified with advanced radar and other instrumentation, flew into and out of Darwin as part of Operation Cumulative, a joint program with the Royal Air Force gathering long-range navigation and bombing data for use in potential air campaigns against the Soviet Union. Wing Commander Glen Cooper served as OC NWA from September 1952 to December 1953. Commencing in October 1953, the RAAF was reorganised from a geographically based command-and-control system into one based on function. In February 1954, the newly constituted functional organisations—Home, Training, and Maintenance Commands—assumed control of all Air Force operations, training and maintenance from North-Western Area Command. NWA headquarters remained in existence but only, according to the Melbourne Argus, as one of Home Command's "remote control points". The headquarters was disbanded on 29 June 1955.

== Orders of battle ==
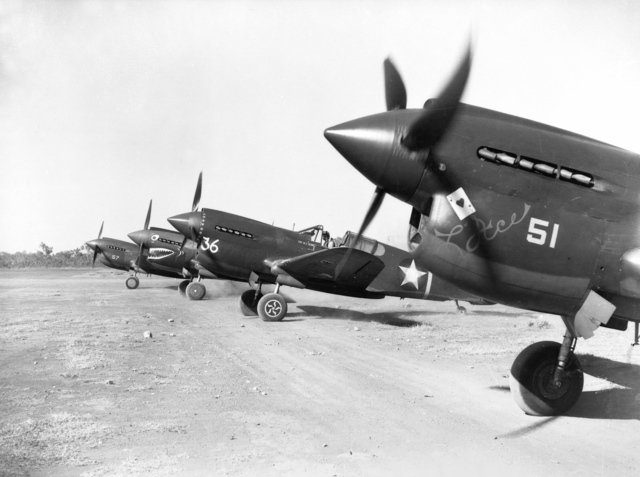
P-40 Kittyhawks of the 8th Squadron, 49th Fighter Group USAAF, at Darwin in 1942

=== April 1942 ===
As at April 1942, NWA controlled the following flying squadrons:

- No. 2 Squadron, equipped with Hudson general-reconnaissance bombers, based at Daly Waters
- No. 12 Squadron, equipped with Wirraway general-purpose aircraft, based at Batchelor
- No. 13 Squadron, equipped with Hudsons, based at Daly Waters
- No. 34 Squadron, equipped with Dragon and Anson transports, based at Daly Waters
- 49th Fighter Group USAAF
  - 7th Fighter Squadron USAAF, equipped with Kittyhawk fighters, based at Batchelor
  - 8th Fighter Squadron USAAF, equipped with Kittyhawks, based at Darwin
  - 9th Fighter Squadron USAAF, equipped with Kittyhawks, based at Darwin

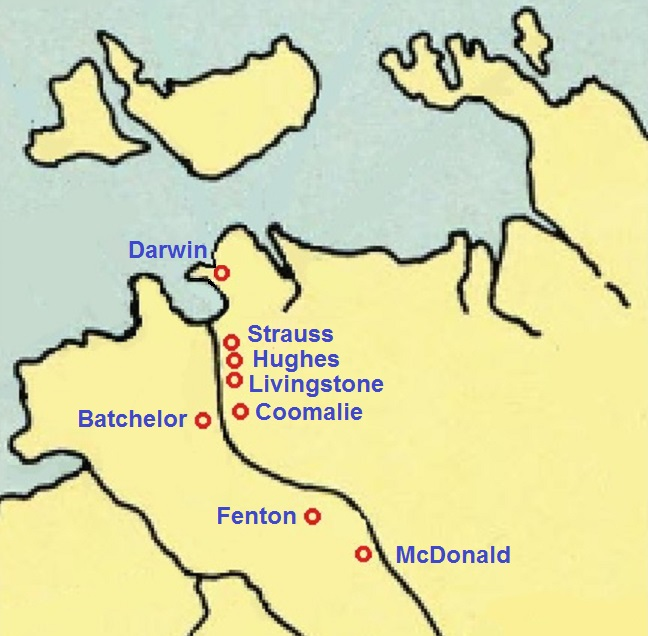
NWA airfields as at April 1943

=== April 1943 ===
As at April 1943, NWA controlled the following flying squadrons:

- No. 1 Fighter Wing
  - No. 54 Squadron RAF, equipped with Spitfire fighters, based at Darwin
  - No. 452 Squadron, equipped with Spitfires, based at Strauss
  - No. 457 Squadron, equipped with Spitfires, based at Livingstone
- No. 2 Squadron, equipped with Hudsons, based at Hughes
- No. 12 Squadron, equipped with Vengeance dive bombers, based at Batchelor
- No. 13 Squadron, equipped with Hudsons, based at Hughes
- No. 18 (Netherlands East Indies) Squadron, equipped with Mitchell medium bombers, based at McDonald
- No. 31 Squadron, equipped with Beaufighter long-range fighters, based at Coomalie
- 319th Bombardment Squadron USAAF, equipped with Liberator heavy bombers, based at Fenton

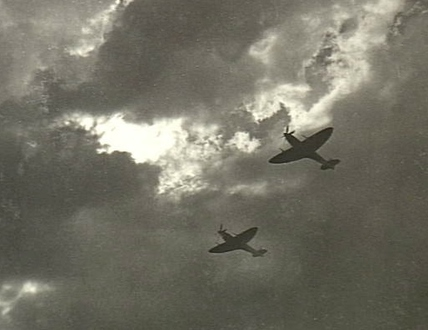
Spitfires over NWA c. 1944

=== April 1944 ===
As at April 1944, NWA controlled the following flying squadrons:

- No. 1 Fighter Wing
  - No. 54 Squadron RAF, equipped with Spitfires, based at Darwin
  - No. 452 Squadron, equipped with Spitfires, based at Strauss
  - No. 457 Squadron, equipped with Spitfires, based at Livingstone
- No. 43 Squadron, equipped with Catalina long-range minelayers, based in Darwin Harbour
- No. 83 Squadron, equipped with Boomerang fighters, based at Gove
- No. 79 Wing
  - No. 1 Squadron, equipped with Beaufort general-reconnaissance bombers, based at Gould
  - No. 2 Squadron, equipped with Beauforts, based at Hughes
  - No. 18 (Netherlands East Indies) Squadron, equipped with Mitchells, based at Batchelor
  - No. 31 Squadron, equipped with Beaufighters, based at Coomalie
- 380th Bombardment Group USAAF
  - 528th Bombardment Squadron USAAF, equipped with Liberators, based at Fenton
  - 529th Bombardment Squadron USAAF, equipped with Liberators, based at Long
  - 530th Bombardment Squadron USAAF, equipped with Liberators, based at Fenton
  - 531th Bombardment Squadron USAAF, equipped with Liberators, based at Long
