= Clyde Fenton =

Medical doctor of the Royal Flying Doctor Service

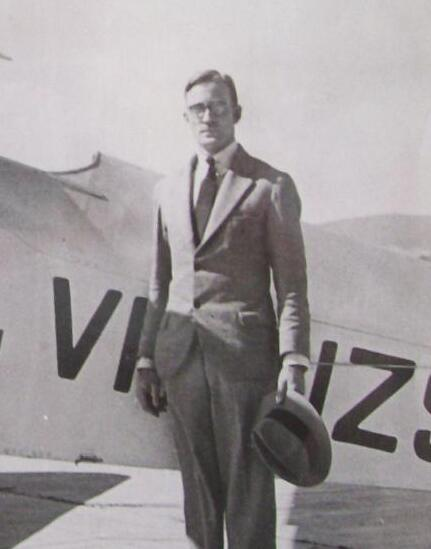
- Born: 16 May 1901; Warrnambool, Victoria, Australia
- Died: 28 February 1982 (aged 80); Malvern, Victoria, Australia
- Occupation: Flying Doctor

Clyde Cornwall Fenton OBE (16 May 1901 – 28 February 1982) was the Northern Territory's first flying doctor. Unlike the other doctors with the Royal Flying Doctor Service of Australia, Fenton was also his own pilot. It is alleged that Fenton flew without the aid of any navigation equipment, air charts, and often proper landing strips. He enjoys a particular renown as a unique and dashing Territory character.

== Biography ==
Fenton was born in Warrnambool, Victoria in 1901 and graduated as a medical doctor in 1925 from Melbourne University. In 1927 Fenton attempted to drive across Australia in record time with his brother Frederick but this attempt was unsuccessful as a car accident in South Australia ended their attempt. Soon after Fenton travelled to Wyndham, Western Australia, where he worked as a district medical officer. While there he bought himself a small DH.53 aircraft (thought to be c/n 118) which was damaged after he attempted, unsuccessfully, to fly it. Soon after he crashed this plane, and when sailing home to Melbourne, he was persuaded by Cecil Cook to stay in Darwin for five months as a doctor.

He then joined the Royal Air Force in England in October 1927, where he gained navigation qualifications, however he resigned soon after in February 1930 after disputes over regulations. In England Fenton also had a short lived marriage to Eve Ryan-Gallacher which ended in divorce.

Fenton had earned his pilot's licence with a goal to join the Royal Flying Doctor Service, but the founder, Reverend John Flynn, had a policy of not using doctors as pilots. As a result, Fenton privately raised money for an aircraft, and in March 1934 arrived in Katherine as the Government Medical Officer. He started an aerial ambulance rescue service which grew into the Northern Territory Aerial Medical Service.

Calls for medical assistance came through the two RFDS stations at Cloncurry and Wyndham, and were relayed by telegram. Fenton utilised primitive bush strips and runways to pick up the patients and return them to Katherine for medical treatment. With no navigational equipment or radios, landings were made on strips lit by kerosene flares or car lights, and only the railway lines and the Katherine River were available to estimate his position.

To the Civil Aviation Department Fenton was a disaster, but to the people of the Top End, he was a hero. On 14 May 1935 Fenton was fined £20 for "endangering public safety" by swooping low over the Star Theatre, Darwin several times, including once between "the front of the circle and the screen". In 1936 he made an unsanctioned flight to China after hearing of his sister's death in child-birth there, he flew there in a small open aircraft to bring his mother home.

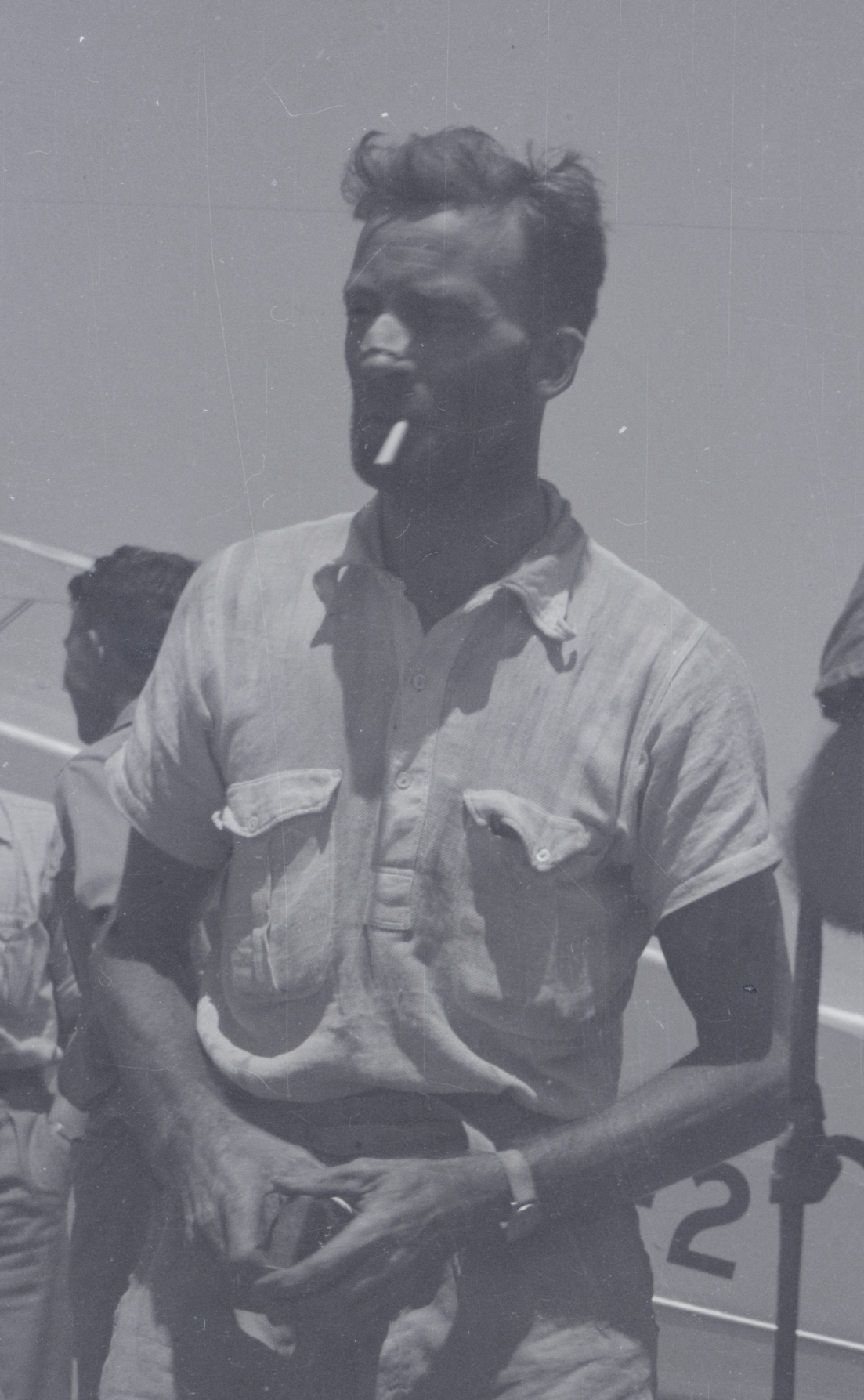
Fenton in 1937 at Newcastle Waters Station, after being rescued by William Hely.

On 14 May 1940 he received his call up for the RAAF by telegram. He was eventually based at Manbulloo airstrip near Katherine, from where he made many emergency medical flights; during this period he worked closely with Olive O'Keeffe a nurse working at the Katherine Hospital. In August 1942 the No 6 Communications Flight was formed with Flight Lieutenant Fenton in command; this was known as `Fenton’s Flying Freighters’. This unit delivered mail and food supplies to army and RAAF outposts, as far afield as the Wessel Islands. The unit was at various times based at the Ross Smith Aerodrome in Darwin, and at the Batchelor airstrip.

Fenton left the Territory after the war and begun working for the Commonwealth Department of Health, initially in Brisbane. While there he wrote Flying Doctor (1947). He married Sheila Ethyl Young, a nurse and widow, in Sydney on 10 October 1949 and they divorced in October 1959. He transferred to Melbourne in 1949 and on 29 March 1963 he married Lavinia Florence Catalano. He retired from medicine in March 1966 and died on 27 February 1982.

== Legacy ==
One of the planes he flew, a Gipsy Moth, is on display at the Fenton Hangar at the Katherine Historical Society Precinct. His name was also given to a World War II airstrip, Fenton Airfield near Hayes Creek, and is remembered by the Clyde Fenton Primary School in Katherine.

== Awards ==
- Oswald Watt Gold Medal, presented by the Associated Australian Aero Clubs in 1937 and is Australia's highest aviation award.

== Namesakes ==
- Clyde Fenton Primary School, Katherine, Northern Territory, Australia
- Fenton Airfield, World War II airfield in the Northern Territory, Australia
- Clyde Fenton Hangar, Katherine Historical Society Precinct, Katherine, Northern Territory, Australia
