= 531st Bombardment Squadron =

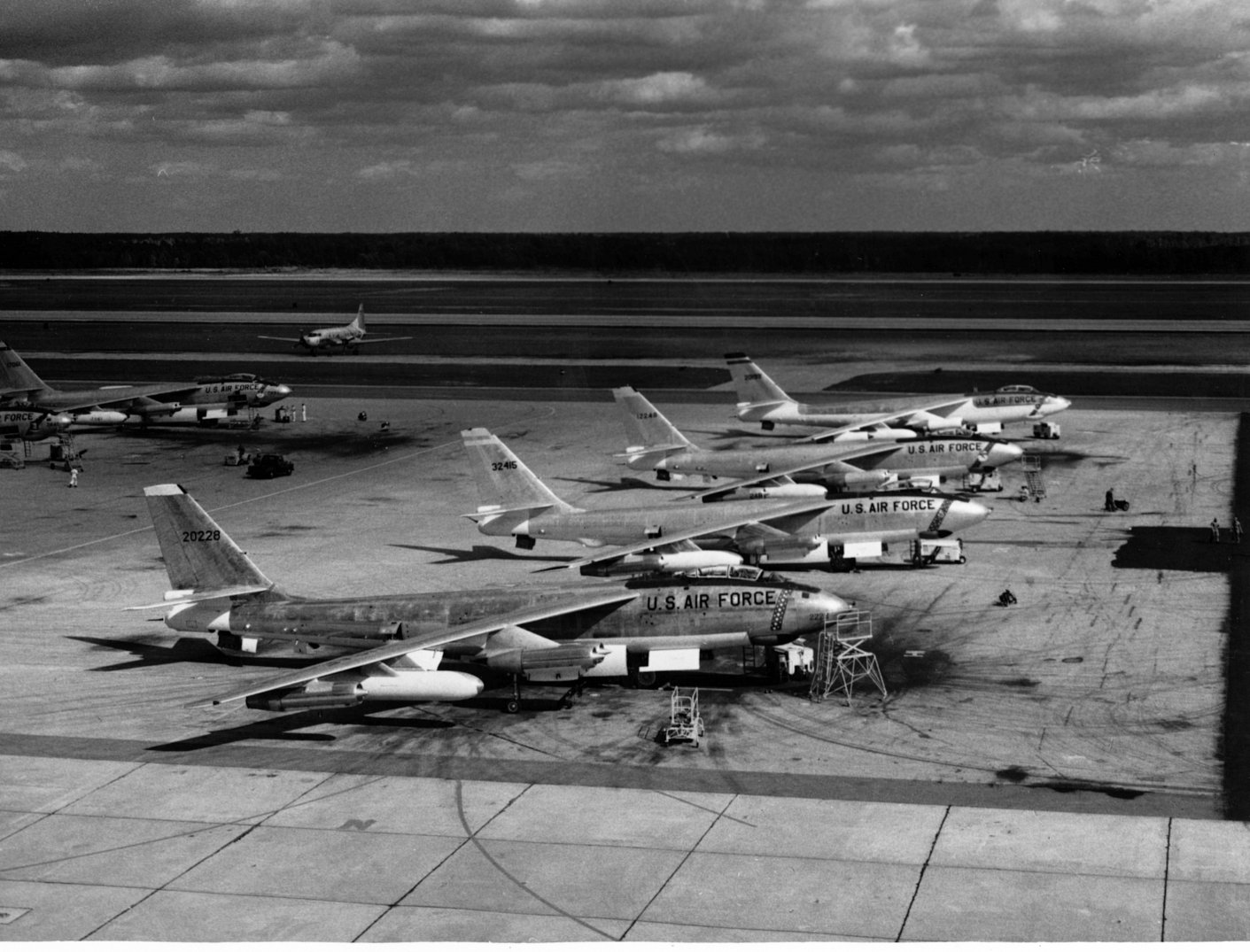
- Strategic Air Command B-47E Stratojets
- Active: 1942–1946; 1947–1951; 1959–1962
- Country: United States
- Branch: United States Air Force
- Role: Medium bomber
- Mascot: Donald Duck
- Engagements: Southwest Pacific Theater
- Decorations: Distinguished Unit Citation; Philippine Presidential Unit Citation

The 531st Bombardment Squadron was a unit of the US Air Force, first activated during World War II. After training as a heavy bomber unit in the United States, it moved to the Southwest Pacific Theater, entering combat in May 1943, flying combat missions from Australia while attached to the Royal Australian Air Force, earning two Distinguished Unit Citations and a Philippine Presidential Unit Citation. In 1945 it moved forward to the Philippines, then to Okinawa. Following V-J Day, the squadron returned to the Philippines and was inactivated there in February 1946.

The squadron was activated in the reserves in 1947, becoming a corollary unit in 1949. The squadron was called to active service in May 1951 for the Korean War and its personnel used to fill out other units.

The squadron was activated at Plattsburgh Air Force Base in May 1959 as a Strategic Air Command bomber unit when Strategic Air Command (SAC) reorganized its Boeing B-47 Stratojet wings to meet increased alert standards. It was inactivated in 1962, when SAC's alert program again changed.

== History ==
=== World War II ===
The squadron was activated at Davis-Monthan Field, Arizona on 3 November 1942 as one of the four original squadrons of the 380th Bombardment Group. After training with Consolidated B-24 Liberators, the squadron moved to the Southwest Pacific Theater in April 1943.

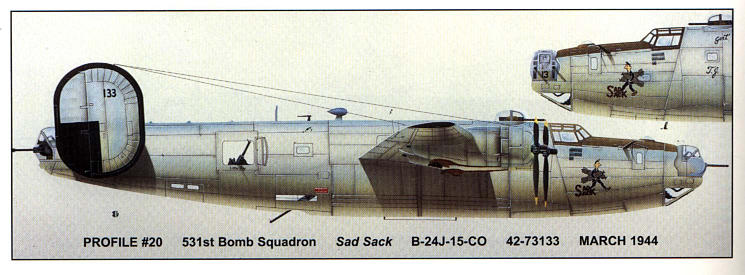
Profile of squadron B-24 nicknamed "Sad Sack"

The air echelon arrived at Manbulloo Airfield, in the Australian Northern Territory by the end of the month. For the remainder of its stay in Australia, the squadron and the rest of the 380th Group would be attached to the Royal Australian Air Force (RAAF). It trained RAAF crews on the operation of the Liberator. Its initial combat operations were in May, when it flew armed reconnaissance missions.

From its home in Australia, the 531st attacked Japanese installations in the Netherlands East Indies and the Bismark Archipelago, including airfields, ground installations and factories. In August 1943, it participated in a series of raids on oil refineries in Balikpapan, Borneo in what at the time was the longest bombing mission flown by an Army Air Forces bomber unit. For this mission, the squadron was awarded the Distinguished Unit Citation (DUC). During April and May 1944, the unit conducted a series of raids on enemy airfields in western New Guinea to support landings in the Hollandia area, for which it was awarded a second DUC.

The squadron was relieved from attachment to the RAAF and moved to the Philippines in February 1945. Operating from Mindoro, the squadron provided air support for ground forces on Luzon, and attacked industrial targets in Formosa, ground installations along the China coast and transportation targets in French Indochina. It also continued its attacks on refineries in Borneo. In August 1945, the squadron moved to Okinawa. Following V-J Day, the squadron flew reconnaissance missions over Japan and flew prisoners of war from Japan to Manila. The squadron became nonoperational and moved to Fort William McKinley in November 1945. It was inactivated there in February 1946.

=== Air Force reserve ===
The squadron was activated in May 1947, in the reserve at MacDill Field, Florida, where its training was supervised by the 465th AAF Base Unit (later the 2582d Air Force Reserve Training Center) of Air Defense Command (ADC). It is not clear whether or not the squadron was fully staffed or equipped at this time. In 1948 Continental Air Command assumed responsibility for managing reserve and Air National Guard units from ADC.

The May 1949 Air Force Reserve program called for a new type of unit, the corollary unit, which was a reserve unit integrated with an active duty unit. The plan was viewed as the best method to train reservists by mixing them with an existing regular unit to perform duties alongside the regular unit. The squadron became a corollary of the 307th Bombardment Wing and Strategic Air Command (SAC) became responsible for its training. All reserve corollary units were mobilized for the Korean war, and the squadron was called to active duty in May 1951. Its personnel were used to bring other units up to strength, and the squadron was inactivated two weeks later.

=== Strategic Air Command ===
From 1958, the Boeing B-47 Stratojet wings of SAC began to assume an alert posture at their home bases, reducing the amount of time spent on alert at overseas bases. The SAC alert cycle divided itself into four parts: planning, flying, alert and rest to meet General Thomas S. Power’s initial goal of maintaining one third of SAC's planes on fifteen minute ground alert, fully fueled and ready for combat to reduce vulnerability to a Soviet missile strike. To implement this new system B-47 wings reorganized from three to four squadrons. The 531st was activated at Plattsburgh Air Force Base, New York on 1 May 1959 as the fourth squadron of the 380th Bombardment Wing. The alert commitment was increased to half the squadron's aircraft in 1962 and the four squadron pattern no longer met the alert cycle commitment, so the squadron was inactivated on 1 January 1962.

== Lineage ==
- Constituted as the 531st Bombardment Squadron (Heavy) on 28 October 1942

Activated on 3 November 1942
Redesignated 531st Bombardment Squadron, Heavy on 26 August 1944
Inactivated on 20 February 1946
Redesignated 531st Bombardment Squadron, Very Heavy on 13 May 1947
Activated in the reserve on 29 May 1947
Redesignated 531st Bombardment Squadron, Medium on 26 June 1949
Ordered to active service on 1 May 1951
Inactivated on 16 May 1951
Activated on 1 May 1959
Discontinued and inactivated on 1 January 1962

=== Assignments ===
- 380th Bombardment Group, 3 November 1942 – 20 February 1946
- Fourteenth Air Force, 29 May 1947
- 380th Bombardment Group, 16 June 1947 – 16 May 1951
- 380th Bombardment Wing, 1 May 1959 – 1 January 1962

=== Stations ===
- Davis-Monthan Field, Arizona, 3 November 1942
- Biggs Field, Texas, 2 December 1942
- Lowry Field, Colorado, 4 March-19 April 1943
- Manbulloo Airfield, Northern Territory, Australia, c. 28 April 1943
- Long Airfield, Northern Territory, Australia, c. 5 December 1943
- RAAF Base Darwin, Northern Territory, Australia, 21 July 1944
- San Jose, Mindoro, Philippines, c. 1 March 1945
- Yontan Airfield, Okinawa, c. 15 August 1945
- Fort William McKinley, Luzon, Philippines, c. 28 November 1945 – 20 February 1946
- MacDill Field (later MacDill Air Force Base), Florida, 29 May 1947 – 16 May 1951
- Plattsburgh Air Force Base, New York, 1 May 1959 – 1 January 1962

=== Aircraft ===
- Consolidated B-24 Liberator, 1942–1945
- Boeing B-29 Superfortress, 1949–1951
- Boeing B-47 Stratojet, 1959–1961

=== Awards and campaigns ===
Award streamer	Award	Dates	Notes
	Distinguished Unit Citation	13, 14, 17 August 1943	Borneo
	Distinguished Unit Citation	20 April 1944-17 May 1944	New Guinea
	Philippine Republic Presidential Unit Citation	21 February 1945-4 July 1945	

Campaign Streamer	Campaign	Dates	Notes
	Air Offensive, Japan	28 April 1943 – 2 September 1945	
	New Guinea	28 April 1943 – 31 December 1944	
	Bismarck Archipelago	15 December 1943 – 27 November 1944	
	Luzon	15 December 1944 – 4 July 1945	
	China Defensive	21 February 1945 – 4 May 1945	
	Southern Philippines	27 February 1945 – 4 July 1945	
	China Offensive	5 May 1945 – 2 September 1945	
	Western Pacific	17 April 1945 – 2 September 1945	

== See also ==
- United States Army Air Forces in Australia
- List of B-47 units of the United States Air Force
- B-24 Liberator units of the United States Army Air Forces
