= 529th Bombardment Squadron =

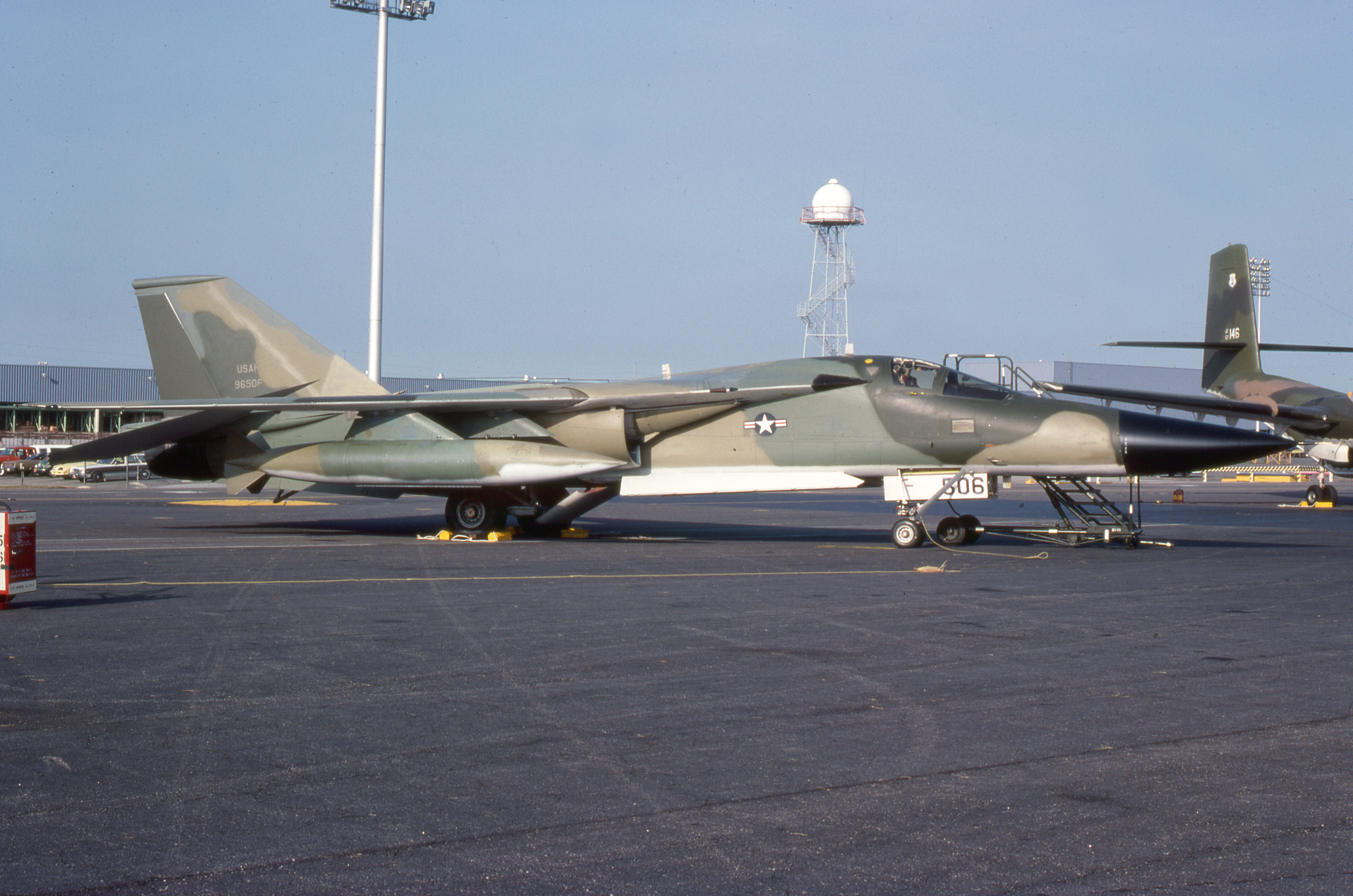
- 380th Bombardment Wing FB-111 at Plattsburgh AFB (Note: Aircraft is General Dynamics FB-111A Aardvark, serial 69-6506. This aircraft was later modified as an F-111G, and was transferred to the Royal Australian Air Force on 18 January 1994. It was scrapped and its fuselage was buried in a landfill in 2011. Baugher, Joe (12 April 2023). "1969 USAF Serial Numbers". Joe Baugher.)
- Active: 1942–1946; 1947–1949; 1955–1966; 1971–1991
- Country: United States
- Branch: United States Air Force
- Role: Medium bomber
- Mascot: Li'l Beaver (World War II)
- Engagements: Southwest Pacific Theater
- Decorations: Distinguished Unit Citation; Air Force Outstanding Unit Award; Philippine Presidential Unit Citation

Insignia
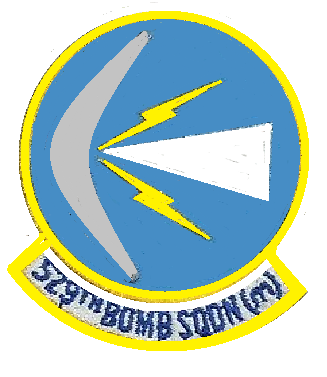
- 529th Bombardment Squadron emblem (Note: Approved 1971.)

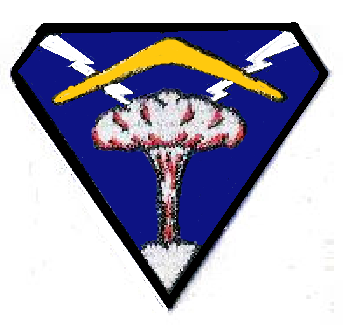
- 529th Bombardment Squadron emblem (Note: Approved 29 March 1957. Description: On an AF blue triangular shaped shield, a nuclear cloud formation rising from the base of disc [sic] white. with red shadows; two white lightning bolts, one in the dexter chief, and one in the sinister chief, radiating toward and terminating in the cloud; a boomerang in chief area of shield, golden yellow, its wings surmounting the lightning bolt[s].)

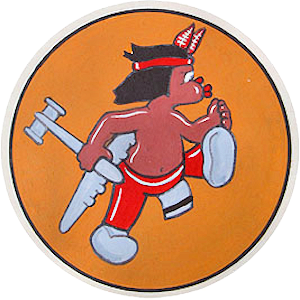
- 529th Bombardment Squadron emblem (World War II)

The 529th Bombardment Squadron is an inactive United States Air Force unit. It was last assigned to the 380th Bombardment Wing at Plattsburgh Air Force Base, New York, where it was inactivated on 1 September 1991.

The squadron was first activated during World War II. After training as a heavy bomber unit in the United States, it moved to the Southwest Pacific Theater, entering combat in May 1943, flying combat missions from Australia while attached to the Royal Australian Air Force, earning two Distinguished Unit Citations and a Philippine Presidential Unit Citation. In 1945 it moved forward to the Philippines, then to Okinawa. Following V-J Day, the squadron returned to the Philippines and was inactivated there in February 1946.

The squadron was activated in the reserves in 1947, but was inactivated in the military budget reductions of 1949.

The squadron was activated at Plattsburgh in July 1955 as a Strategic Air Command (SAC) bomber unit. At Plattsburgh, it flew Boeing B-47 Stratojets until inactivating in 1966 when the B-47 was withdrawn from service with SAC. It was again activated in 1971 with General Dynamics FB-111 Aardvarks until inactivating when its planes were transferred to Tactical Air Command and modified for conventional operations.

== History ==
=== World War II ===
The squadron was activated at Davis-Monthan Field, Arizona on 3 November 1942 as one of the four original squadrons of the 380th Bombardment Group. After training with Consolidated B-24 Liberators, the squadron moved to the Southwest Pacific Theater in April 1943.

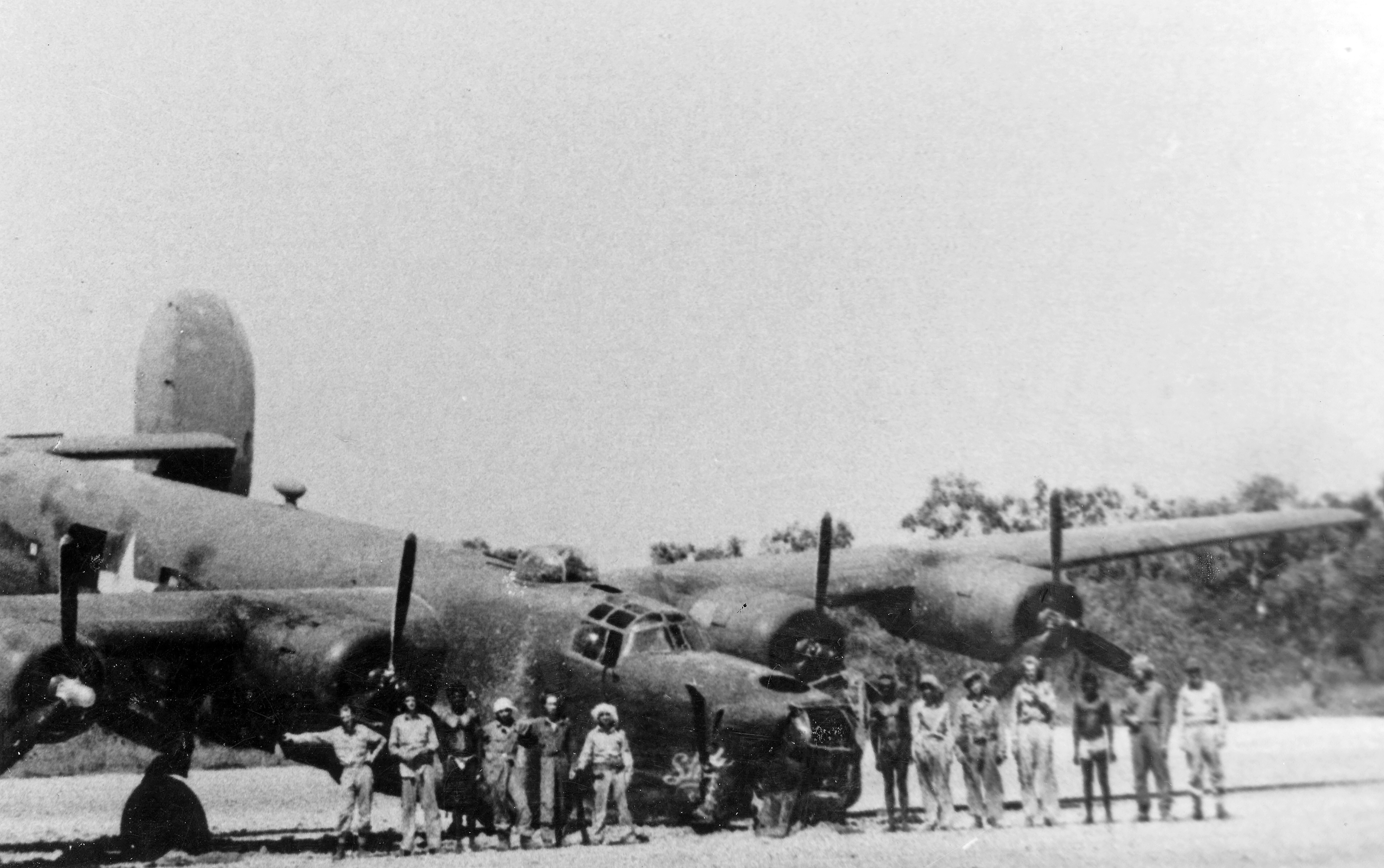
380th Group B-24 after crash landing in Northern Australia after a raid on Balikpapan

The air echelon arrived at Manbulloo Airfield, in the Australian Northern Territory by the end of April. For the remainder of its stay in Australia, the squadron and the rest of the 380th Group would be attached to the Royal Australian Air Force (RAAF). It trained RAAF crews on the operation of the Liberator. Its initial combat operations were in May, when it flew armed reconnaissance missions.

From its home in Australia, the 529th attacked Japanese installations in the Netherlands East Indies and the Bismark Archipelago, including airfields, ground installations and factories. In August 1943, it participated in a series of raids on oil refineries in Balikpapan, Borneo in what at the time was the longest bombing mission flown by an Army Air Forces bomber unit. For this mission, the squadron was awarded the Distinguished Unit Citation (DUC). During April and May 1944, the unit conducted a series of raids on enemy airfields in western New Guinea to support landings in the Hollandia area, for which it was awarded a second DUC.

The squadron was relieved from attachment to the RAAF and moved to the Philippines in February 1945. Operating from Mindoro, the squadron provided air support for ground forces on Luzon, and attacked industrial targets in Formosa, ground installations along the China coast and transportation targets in French Indochina. It also continued its attacks on refineries in Borneo. In August 1945, the squadron moved to Okinawa. Following V-J Day, the squadron flew reconnaissance missions over Japan and flew prisoners of war from Japan to Manila. The squadron became nonoperational and moved to Fort William McKinley in November 1945. It was inactivated there in February 1946.

=== Air Force reserves ===
The squadron was activated in the reserves at Jacksonville Municipal Airport, Florida, where its training was supervised by Air Defense Command (ADC). Although nominally a very heavy bomber unit, it is not clear whether or not the squadron was fully staffed or equipped at this time. In 1948 Continental Air Command assumed responsibility for managing reserve and Air National Guard units from ADC. President Truman’s reduced 1949 defense budget required reductions in the number of units in the Air Force, and the 529th was inactivated and not replaced as reserve flying operations at Jacksonville ceased.

=== Strategic Air Command ===
==== B-47 era ====
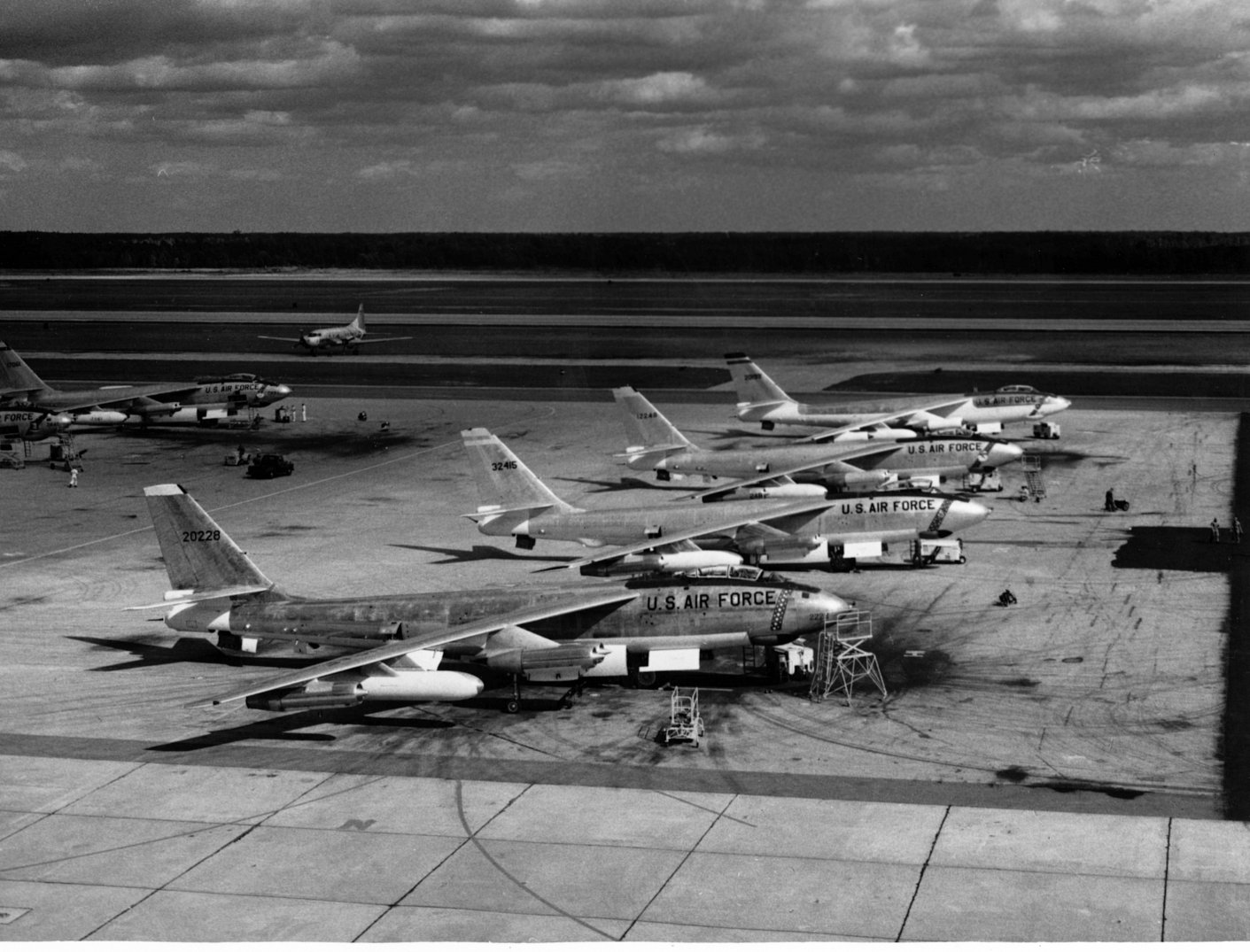
SAC B-47Es

The squadron was again activated at Plattsburgh Air Force Base, New York in July 1955 as part of the 380th Bombardment Wing and equipped with Boeing B-47 Stratojets. Although activated on the 11th, the squadron did not begin to be operational until the end of the month. Substantial work was ongoing to make Plattsburgh operational, and in the first half of 1956, most training was conducted through a detachment of the 380th Wing located at another B-47 base, Pinecastle Air Force Base, Florida. From 3 April 1957 to 3 July 1957, the squadron deployed to RAF Brize Norton on Operation Reflex. Reflex placed Stratojets and Boeing KC-97s at bases closer to the Soviet Union for 90 day periods, although individuals rotated back to home bases during unit Reflex deployments The percentage of SAC planes on fifteen minute ground alert, fully fueled and ready for combat to reduce vulnerability to a Soviet missile strike gradually grew over the next three years to reach the goal of 1/3 of SAC’s force on alert by 1960.

From 1958, the Stratojet wings of Strategic Air Command (SAC) began to assume an alert posture at their home bases, reducing the amount of time spent on alert at overseas bases. The alert commitment was increased to half the squadron's aircraft in 1962.

After the detection of Soviet missiles in Cuba, SAC dispersed its B-47s on 22 October 1962. Most dispersal bases were civilian airfields with AF Reserve or Air National Guard units. Squadron B-47s were configured for execution of the Emergency War Order as soon as possible after dispersal. On 24 October 1962, SAC went to DEFCON 2, placing all its combat aircraft on alert. As tensions eased, on 15 November 1/6 of the dispersed B-47s were recalled to their home bases. On 21 November, SAC went to DEFCON 3. Dispersed B-47s and supporting tankers were recalled on 24 November. On 27 November the squadron returned to its normal alert posture.

The squadron flew the B-47 Until 1965, when the medium bomber began to be phased out of SAC's inventory. Ground alert for B-47s was terminated on 11 February 1966. The squadron began to send its Stratojets to the Aerospace Maintenance and Regeneration Center at Davis-Monthan Air Force Base for retirement. It became nonoperational on 11 June 1966 and was inactivated on 25 June.

==== FB-111 era ====
In July 1971, the squadron was activated and became combat ready with the General Dynamics FB-111A Aardvark medium bomber. In 1991, the squadron began transferring its aircraft to be modified as F-111G fighter-bombers. With the exception of museum aircraft, the last FB-111 was gone by July 1991, and the squadron was inactivated in September.

== Lineage ==
- Constituted as the 529th Bombardment Squadron (Heavy) on 28 October 1942

Activated on 3 November 1942
Redesignated 529th Bombardment Squadron, Heavy on 26 August 1944
Inactivated on 20 February 1946
Redesignated 529th Bombardment Squadron, Very Heavy on 3 July 1947
Activated in the reserve on 17 July 1947
Inactivated on 27 June 1949
Redesignated 529th Bombardment Squadron, Medium on 20 May 1955
Activated on 11 July 1955
Inactivated 25 June 1966
Activated on 1 January 1971
Inactivated on 1 September 1991

=== Assignments ===
- 380th Bombardment Group, 3 November 1942 – 20 February 1946
- 380th Bombardment Group, 17 July 1947 – 27 June 1949
- 380th Bombardment Wing, 11 July 1955 – 25 June 1966
- 380th Bombardment Wing, 6 January 1971 – 1 September 1991

=== Stations ===
- Davis-Monthan Field, Arizona, 3 November 1942
- Biggs Field, Texas, 2 December 1942
- Lowry Field, Colorado, 4 March-19 April 1943
- Manbulloo Airfield, Northern Territory, Australia, 28 April 1943
- Long Airfield, Northern Territory, Australia, c. 7 November 1943
- RAAF Base Darwin, Northern Territory, Australia, c. 10 July 1944
- San Jose, Mindoro, Philippines, c. 28 February 1945
- Motobu Airfield, Okinawa, 12 August 1945
- Fort William McKinley, Luzon, Philippines c. 28 November 1945 – 20 February 1946
- Jacksonville Municipal Airport, Florida, 17 July 1947 – 27 June 1949
- Plattsburgh Air Force Base, New York, 11 July 1955 – 25 June 1966
- Plattsburgh Air Force Base, New York, 1 January 1971 – 1 September 1991

=== Aircraft ===
- Consolidated B-24 Liberator, 1942–1945
- Boeing B-47 Stratojet, 1955–1966
- General Dynamics FB-111A Aardvark, 1971-1991

=== Awards and campaigns ===
Award streamer	Award	Dates	Notes
	Distinguished Unit Citation	13, 14, 17 August 1943	Borneo
	Distinguished Unit Citation	20 April 1944-17 May 1944	New Guinea
	Air Force Outstanding Unit Award	1 July 1974-30 June 1975	
	Air Force Outstanding Unit Award	1 July 1979-30 June 1981	
	Air Force Outstanding Unit Award	1 July 1983-30 June 1985	
	Air Force Outstanding Unit Award	1 July 1985-30 June 1986	
	Philippine Republic Presidential Unit Citation	21 February 1945-4 July 1945	

Campaign Streamer	Campaign	Dates	Notes
	Air Offensive, Japan	28 April 1943 – 2 September 1945	
	New Guinea	28 April 1943 – 31 December 1944	
	Bismarck Archipelago	15 December 1943 – 27 November 1944	
	Luzon	15 December 1944 – 4 July 1945	
	China Defensive	21 February 1945 – 4 May 1945	
	Southern Philippines	27 February 1945 – 4 July 1945	
	China Offensive	5 May 1945 – 2 September 1945	
	Western Pacific	17 April 1945 – 2 September 1945	

== See also ==
- United States Army Air Forces in Australia
- List of B-47 units of the United States Air Force
- B-24 Liberator units of the United States Army Air Forces
