= Plattsburgh Air Force Base =

Airport near Plattsburgh, New York

- Plattsburgh, New York in the United States
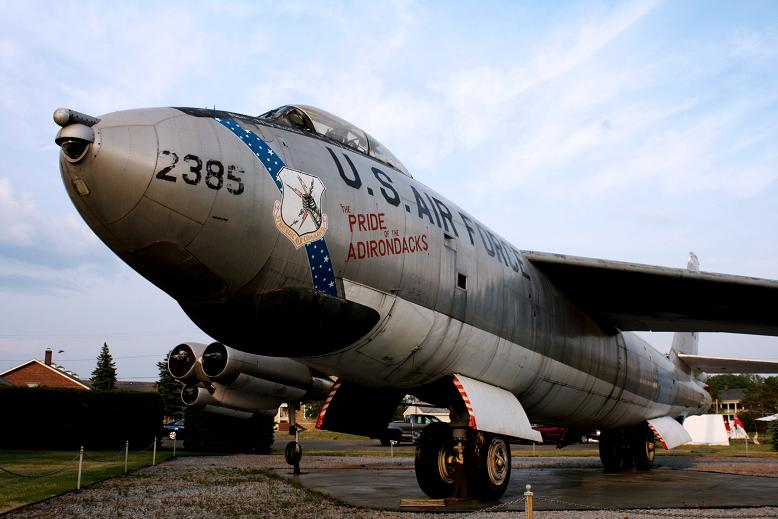
- A Boeing B-47 Stratojet on display at the former from Plattsburgh AFB

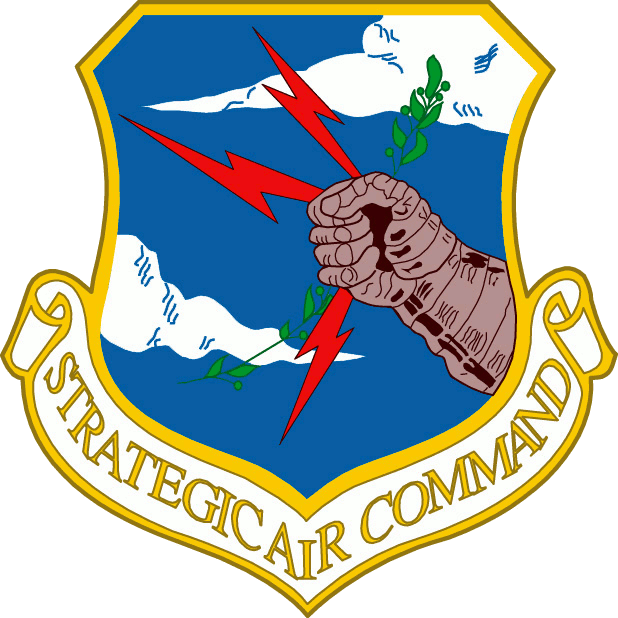

Site information
- Type: US Air Force Base
- Owner: Department of Defense
- Operator: US Air Force
- Controlled by: Strategic Air Command (1954–1992); Air Mobility Command (1992–1995)
- Condition: Closed

Location
- Location within New York Location within the United States
- Coordinates: 44°39′14″N 073°27′56″W

Site history
- Built: 1954–1955
- In use: 1955–1995
- Fate: Became Plattsburgh International Airport and other civilian uses

Airfield information
- Identifiers: IATA: PBG, ICAO: KPBG, WMO: 726225
- Elevation: 234 feet (71 m) AMSL
Runways
Direction	Length and surface
17/35	11,758 feet (3,584 m) Asphalt/concrete

Plattsburgh Air Force Base is a former United States Air Force (USAF) Strategic Air Command (SAC) base covering 3,447 acres (13.7 km^{2}) in the extreme northeast corner of New York, located on the western shore of Lake Champlain opposite Burlington, Vermont, in the town of Plattsburgh, New York.

The base closed on 25 September 1995, pursuant to the Defense Base Realignment and Closure Act of 1990 (10 U.S.C. Sec. 2687 note) and the recommendations of the Defense Base Realignment and Closure Commission. It is now a civilian airport and industrial complex, operated by the Plattsburgh Air Base Development Authority. The airfield is now known as Plattsburgh International Airport.

== Geography ==
The former air base is bordered by the city of Plattsburgh and the Saranac River to the north and the Salmon River to the south. It lies on the western shore of Lake Champlain on the New York-Vermont border.

== History ==
=== Military presence before the base ===
Plattsburgh was the third oldest military post in the United States. The U.S. has maintained a military presence at the site of the now-closed base since 30 December 1814.

In particular:

- On 30 December 1814, the Federal Government purchased 200 acres for the construction of the "Plattsburgh Barracks".
- In 1838, additional parcels of land were acquired and stone barracks were built to house the personnel.
- During the Civil War, Union troops organized and departed from the base.
- During the Spanish–American War, the 21st Infantry was transferred from Plattsburgh Barracks to Cuba in June 1898. The troops returned to Plattsburgh in September 1898.
- During the Interwar period, Plattsburgh Barracks was the home of the 26th Infantry Regiment of the "Iron first " division.
- In 1944, it was turned over to the United States Navy and became "Camp MacDonough", an indoctrination school for officers.
- After World War II, from March 1946 to 1953, the base was used for college student housing for area colleges and extensions schools.

=== Plattsburgh Air Force Base (PAFB) ===
In 1953, the site returned to the Federal government and Plattsburgh Barracks were renamed Plattsburgh Air Force Base. The USAF held a ground breaking ceremony for the new strategic base on 29 January 1954, and construction began immediately. The runway was completed and the first aircraft landed on 7 November 1955. However, operational facilities were not completed until 1956 due to several work-stoppages and severe winter weather.

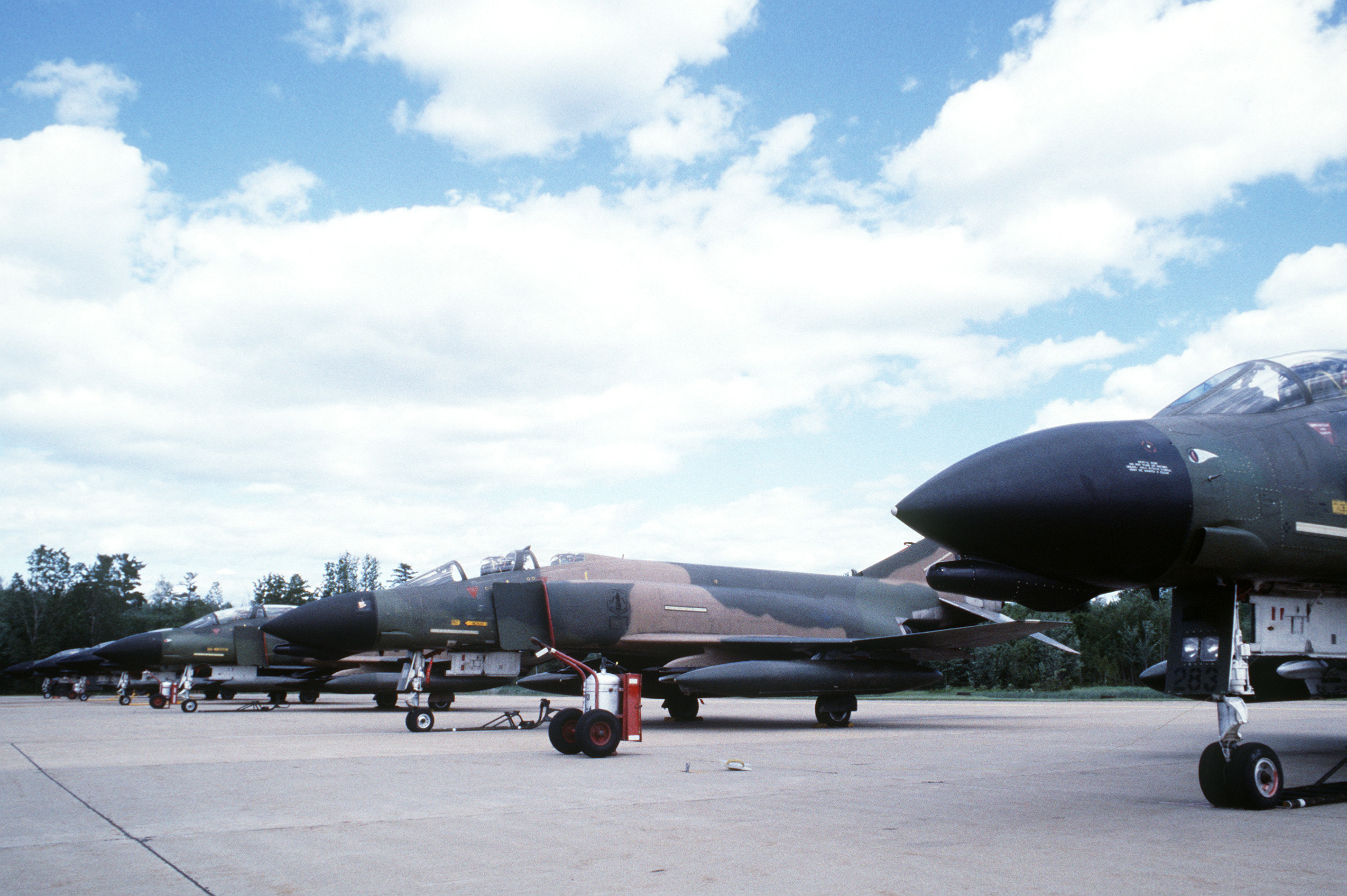
F-4D Phantom IIs from the 134th Tactical Fighter Squadron of the Vermont Air National Guard at Plattsburgh AFB

Built during the Cold War, Plattsburgh AFB's runway is large enough to land the Space Shuttle. It was on a list of alternate landing sites for the Shuttle. Space Shuttle Columbia astronaut Michael P. Anderson, born at Plattsburgh AFB, was a USAF pilot at Plattsburgh AFB when he was selected by NASA in 1994.

Major commands to which the base was assigned:

- Strategic Air Command, 1954 – 1 June 1992
- Air Mobility Command, 1 June 1992 – 25 September 1995

==== Major units assigned ====
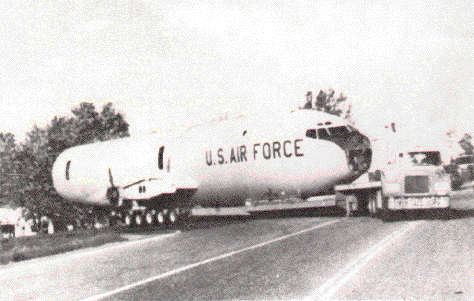
KC-135 Fuselage Departs Plattsburgh AFB

- 308th Bombardment Wing (Wing existed on paper, but was non-operational)
  - 373d Bombardment Squadron (Medium)
  - 374th Bombardment Squadron (Medium)
  - 375th Bombardment Squadron (Medium)
  - 425th Bombardment Squadron (Medium)
- 380th Bomb Wing
  - 26th Air Refueling Squadron (7 August 1957 – 31 July 1959)
  - 310th Air Refueling Squadron (25 January 1967 – 1 October 1994)
  - 380th Air Refueling Squadron (16 August 1956 – April 1961; 15 September 1964 – 1 October 1994)
  - 528th Bombardment Squadron (11 July 1955 – 1 July 1991)
  - 529th Bombardment Squadron (11 July 1955 – 25 June 1966 and 6 January 1971 – 1 September 1991)
  - 530th Bombardment Squadron (11 July 1955 – 25 June 1966 and 1 July 1986 – 1 July 1991) (later 530th Strategic Bomber Training Squadron, Combat Crew Training Squadron)
  - 531st Bombardment Squadron (1 May 1959 – 1 January 1962)
  - 556th Strategic Missile Squadron: 15 September 1964 – 25 June 1965)
- 497th Air Refueling Wing (1 January 1963 – 15 September 1964)
  - 26th Air Refueling Squadron (1 January 1963 – 15 September 1964)
  - 380th Air Refueling Squadron (1 January 1963 – 15 September 1964)
- 820th Strategic Aerospace Division
  - 556th Strategic Missile Squadron

==== Missile operations ====
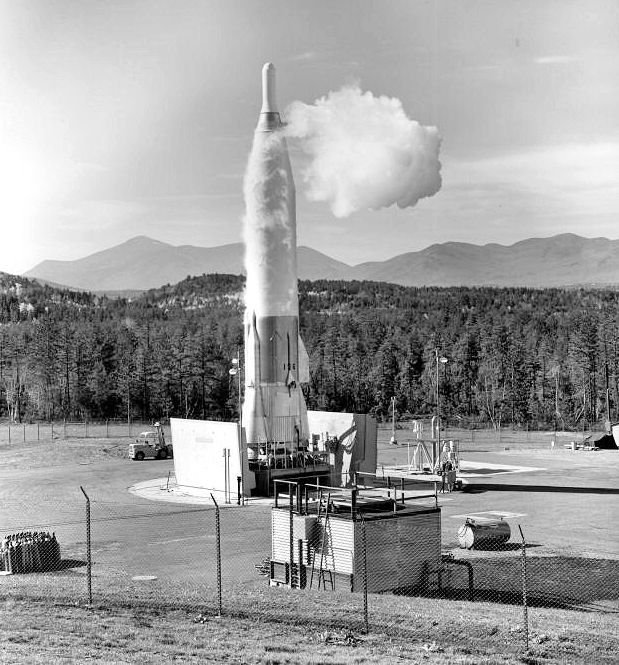
A Convair SM-65F Atlas #100 at Site 6 AuSable Forks NY

Plattsburgh Air Force Base was designated as one of four major Atlas launching systems in the U.S., the only ICBM missile system deployed east of the Mississippi River.

During the period 1961 and 1963, 12 Atlas-F missile sites were constructed within a 50-mile radius of the base, thus giving the 380th the capability to launch 12 missiles. All sites were in New York state, except for two located on the other side of Lake Champlain in Vermont. The 556th Strategic Missile Squadron, formerly assigned to Dow AFB, Maine, was transferred to Plattsburgh AFB on 1 October 1961, and became completely operational on 20 December 1962. It was inactivated on 25 June 1965.

==== BRACC 1991 and closure ====
During the 1991 Base Realignment and Closure Commission (BRACC) deliberations, PAFB wound up being pitted against Loring AFB in Limestone, Maine. The people of Maine put up a brief fight but, at the end, PAFB was spared.

Two years later, when BRACC reconvened for another round of closures, PAFB, along with McGuire AFB in New Jersey and Griffiss AFB in Rome, New York, were considered for closing. The local sentiment was that, again, PAFB will be spared mainly because the USAF had plans to transform the base to a major Strategic Air Command base for the Northeast, expanding to add more aircraft and personnel.

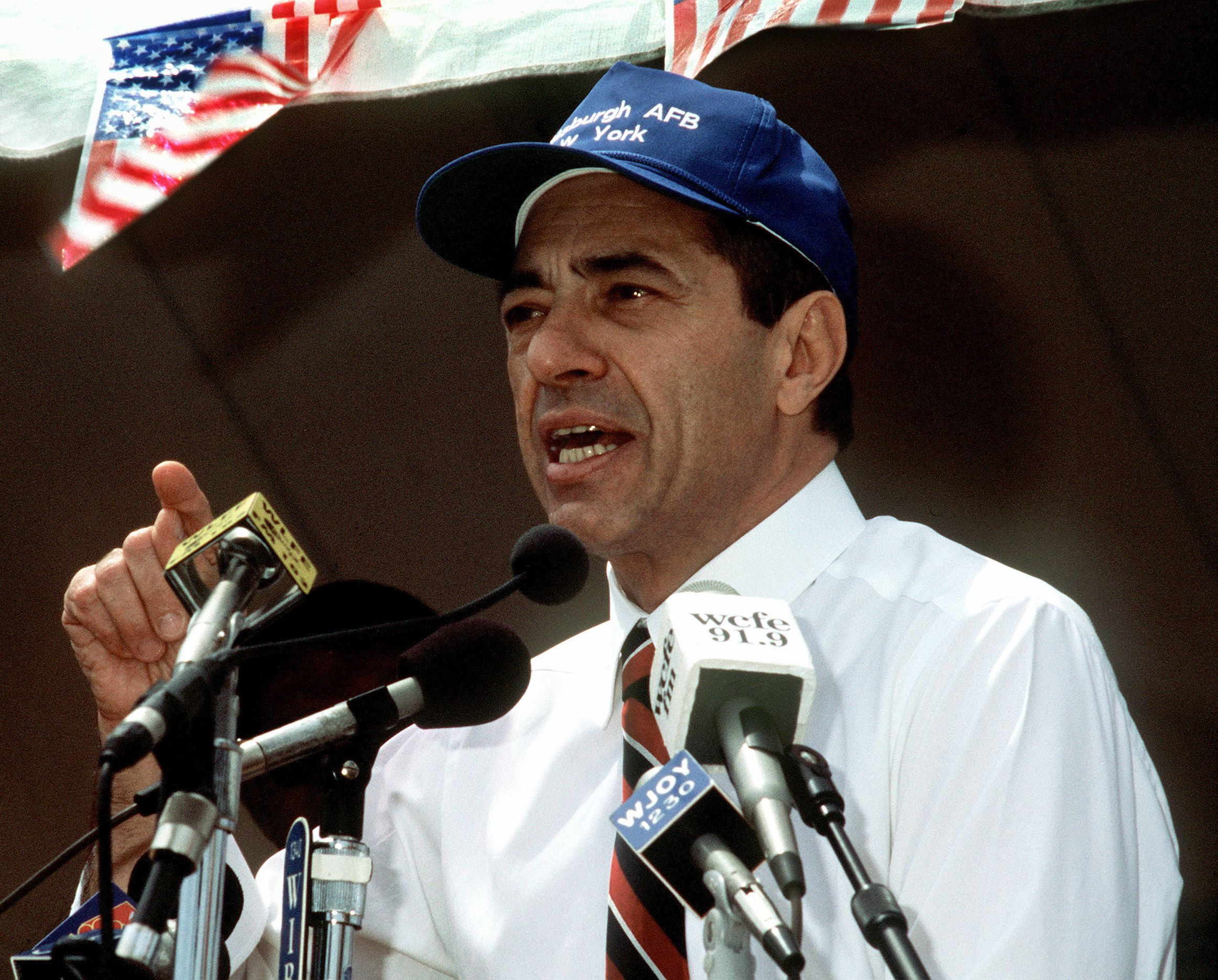
Governor Mario Cuomo speaking at a rally in favor of keeping the base

It was a hard battle. Rallies were held and a local leadership group, dubbed Team Plattsburgh, was put together to save the base. Testimonies were held, before several BRACC members, to keep PAFB open and give it the intended expansion. At the end, McGuire AFB won over PAFB.

Plattsburgh AFB was officially closed on 30 September 1995, as a result of the 1993 Defense Closure and Realignment actions. The closure ceremony took place on Sept.29, 1995.

Bombardier Transportation established a plant on the site. It has produced standard passenger cars, locomotives, hybrids, light rail cars and subway cars.

=== Current status ===
Plattsburgh Airbase Redevelopment Corporation (PARC), led by the nationally known planner, David Holmes, was created to manage the 5,000-acre (20 km^{2}) property. Holmes had overseen the redevelopment plan which included a mixed-use solution to overcome the economic shortfall that occurred when the military moved out. Uses included Aviation, Biotechnology, Industrial and Recreation. Ultimately, PARC split up the base into 165 parcels for redevelopment.

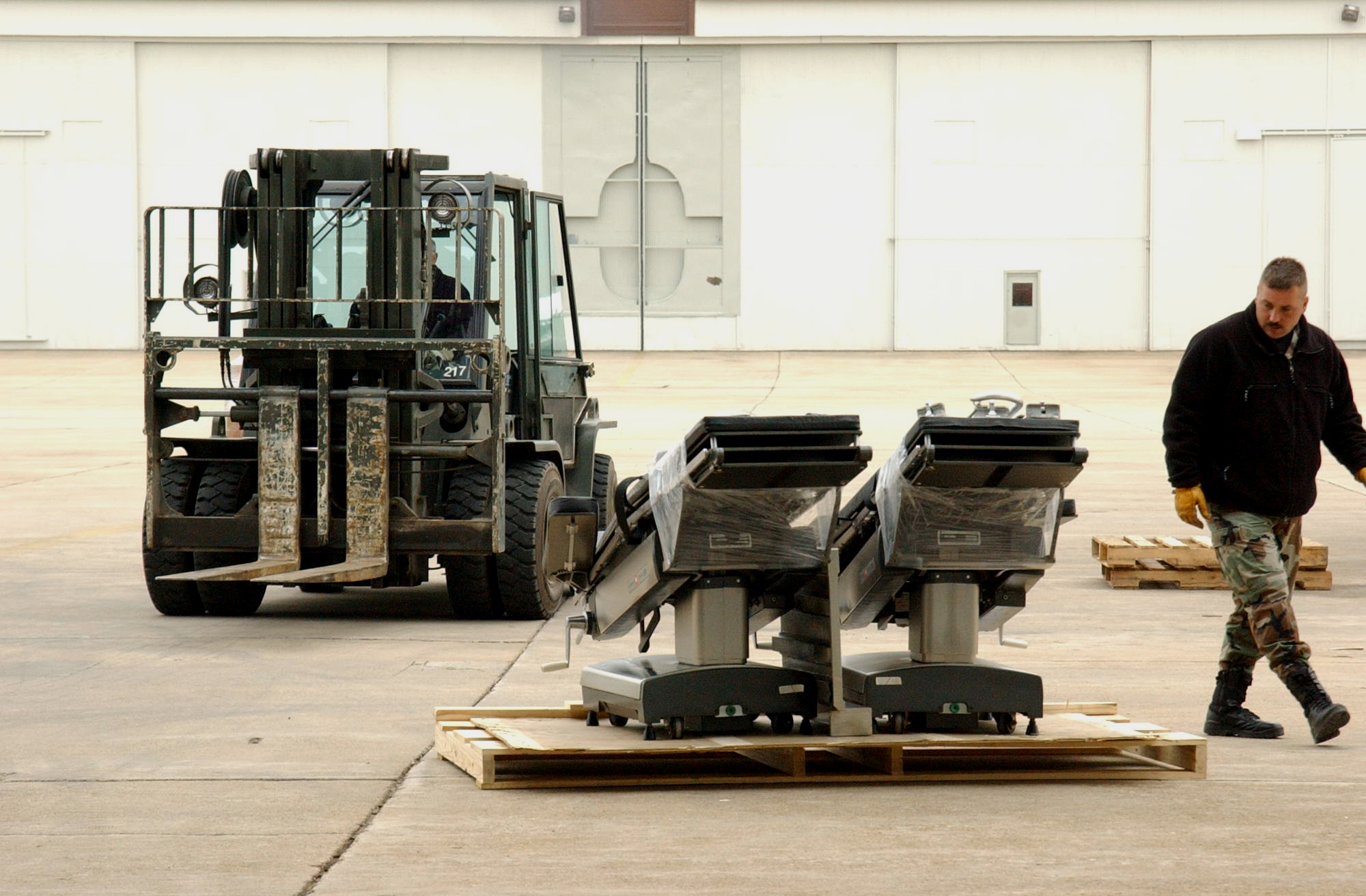
Operating tables being taken out of the old base hospital, in the Double Cantilever Hangar

While community leaders feared in 1995, at the time of the actual closure, that the North Country's economy would collapse, this did not turn out to be the case; the base actually only accounted for $42 million in economic impact (about 8 percent of the local economy) because it was so isolated. It was anticipated that it would take 20 years to replace the impact. But in 1996, Dave Werlin of Great Northeast productions and PARC's Director of Planning, Nate Sears, devised a way to make up $30 million in 3 days. On 16 and 17 August 1996, PARC hosted a massive music concert on the runway of the old decommissioned airbase by the band Phish. The concert, known as The Clifford Ball, was attended by 70,000 people and added $30 million to the local economy. The concert was the largest Rock concert in North America in 1996 and drew attention from The New York Times, MTV and numerous news media world-wide. The concert was possible due to a coalition of entities, including the New York State Police, Clinton County Sheriff, City of Plattsburgh, CVPH Medical Center, the Clinton County Health Department and numerous other private and public organizations. Although Phish wanted to return, PARC's Board of Directors declined in a 6-1 vote and subsequent Phish concerts were held at the former Loring Air Force Base in Limestone, Maine, where they generated $25 million and $40 million for the local community, respectively in 1997 and 1998.

NSYNC were scheduled to hold a concert at the former base on June 10, 2001 as part of the PopOdyssey tour, but it was cancelled.

As of 2016, PARC tenants on former airbase properties include:

- Wood Group
- Pratt & Whitney Industrial Turbine Services
- Sikorsky
- UPS Air Freight
- FedEx Air Freight
- PrimeLink
- Gradient etc.

The site also hosts a number of specialty services on site, including acres of parks, trails and playing fields as well as an 18-hole golf course, a day care center and a gym.

On the original Military Reservation, on the shores of Lake Champlain, is the Old Base Museum Campus. There are five museums within 200 feet of each other – the Clinton County Historical Museum, the Air Force Base Museum, the Champlain Valley Transportation Museum, the Kids' Station Children's Museum and the War of 1812 Museum, all housed in former military buildings. Included on the Museum Campus are edifices built in the 1890s including Officers' Row, the old Headquarters Building and the old fire station. The historic district around the Oval parade ground saw General Leonard Wood's founding of the Plattsburgh Idea, a training program started to prepare officers for duty in World War II. There is also a Memorial Chapel, the Clyde A. Lewis Air Park, and the Old Post Cemetery, in which a Spanish American War Medal of Honor recipient is buried. Two of the original structures built just after the War of 1812 are still on Campus – the Old Stone Barracks and the original powder magazine.

The USAF lists Plattsburgh among its BRAC "success stories."

== Environmental problems ==
It is designated a military superfund site.

Historically, site contaminants originally included volatile organic compounds (VOCs), including trichloroethene (TCE), dichloroethene (DCE), and vinyl chloride, fuel-related compounds (mainly benzene, toluene, ethylbenzene, and xylene), pesticides, various metals including chromium and cadmium, and lead and munitions waste from an old small arms range and an explosive-ordnance demolition range. As stated in other sections of this site profile, most of the formerly-contaminated areas have been cleaned up. In addition to groundwater contamination, other potential exposures included direct contact with and ingestion of contaminants found in soil. The only known remaining soil contamination at the former base is at the landfills, which have been capped and are fenced off.

Additional potential risk to human health exists due to soil vapor intrusion (SVI) into buildings by VOCs. However, this contaminant pathway has been extensively studied across the entire base, mainly in association with the FT-002 / Industrial Area Groundwater OU. Soil vapor extraction (SVE) systems were installed at 3 buildings in the industrial area of the base where concentrations of VOCs warranted mitigation and/or remediation. In addition, a large portion of the base is covered by a LUC/IC for SVI that requires either mitigation of risk or sampling and evaluation of risk prior to the construction of new buildings or modifications to or change in use of existing buildings. Any sampling and risk evaluations conducted would be reviewed by the Air Force and regulatory agencies, and continued monitoring or mitigation, as necessary, would be required. Affected property owners must also certify compliance annually with the Air Force, which also conducts annual LUC/IC inspections.

== See also ==
- 1968 Thule Air Base B-52 crash
- Operation Chrome Dome
