= Manbulloo Airfield =

World War II airfield in the Northern Territory

- Manbulloo, Northern Territory, Australia

Site information
- Type: Military

Location
- Coordinates: 14°35′58.35″S 132°11′24.22″E

Site history
- In use: 1942-1945

Manbulloo Airfield was a World War II airfield built at Manbulloo Station, near Katherine, Northern Territory.

== History ==
Works on the airfield were initially undertaken by the 43rd Engineer Regiment (US Army) in April 1942. The Allied Works Council completed the works and the airfield was operational by 19 May 1942. The runway was 1,981 m × 30 m (6,499 ft × 98 ft).

The B-24 Liberators from the 529th and 530th Bombardment Squadrons moved to Manbulloo shortly after arriving from the United States in April 1943, with headquarters of their parent unit, the 380th Bomb Group being at Fenton Airfield. With the Northern Territory being subjected to the occasional Japanese air raid at the time, it was decided to disperse the operational squadrons over several airfields. From Manbulloo Airfield the squadron attacked Japanese airfields, ground installations, shipping, and industries in the Netherlands East Indies and the Bismarck Archipelago. Other missions included disruption of enemy sea channels; dropping photoflash bombs and propaganda pamphlets. Both squadrons were reassigned to Long Airfield in late 1943.

The airfield was closed in 1944 and apparently abandoned. Today from the air no wartime buildings, taxiways or hardstands are evident, only the remains of the main NW-SE runway exist which is being used as an access road to an irrigated mango plantation, which was planted in 1972, the first commercial mango plantation in NT, it is now owned by Manbulloo Limited who export mangoes around the world. The remains of what appears to be a second runway (NNW-SSE) is faintly visible in aerial photography, along with some roads possibly a part of the airfield are also faintly visible. No evidence of a containment area is visible.

An access road to the airfield is joined to the Victoria Highway, however, the airfield is on private property as part of the million hectare cattle property Manbulloo Station.

On 12 June 2010, the airfield's operations centre and abattoir was listed on the Northern Territory Heritage Register.

== Units based at Manbulloo Airfield ==
- 529th Bombardment Squadron (380th Bombardment Group), (28 April-7 November 1943)
- 531st Bombardment Squadron (380th Bombardment Group), (28 April-5 December 1943)
- No. 24 Squadron RAAF
- No. 34 Squadron RAAF

== See also ==
- United States Army Air Forces in Australia (World War II)
- List of airports in the Northern Territory
