= Olive O'Keeffe =

Australian nurse in the Northern Territory (1907–1988)

Olive O'Keeffe MBE (14 May 1907 – 16 November 1988) was a nurse who spent much of her life in the Northern Territory of Australia.

She had close associations with Clyde Fenton with whom she worked in Katherine and she also worked at The Bungalow and the Alice Springs Public Hospital in Central Australia for many years. Her former home in Katherine is heritage protected and known as the "O'Keeffe Residence".

== Biography ==
O'Keeffe was born in Montville, Queensland and wanted to be a nurse from a very young age and undertook her training for this at the Brisbane General Hospital after which she also trained as a midwife.

After encouragement from a close friend, Sister Morrison, who has been working in the Northern Territory for many years, O'Keeffe moved to Darwin in 1936 (arriving 19 November on the Marella steamship) where she worked at the Darwin Hospital for a short time. Soon after this she travelled to Pine Creek, where she was the only nurse and where there were no doctors available. To assist her Clyde Fenton, who was based in Katherine, would fly in every Sunday to assist and when there were emergencies that she could not handle.

Soon after that she moved again to Tennant Creek, where her friend Sister Morrison was also working but by 1938 she moved again and went to Katherine to work directly alongside Clyde Fenton. She said of this:

At that time Dr Clyde Fenton was Resident and myself and one other nursing Sister worked twenty-four hour shifts and were on call in an emergency. A young girl was employed to attend to the washing up and kitchen duties. Dr Fenton's aerial ambulance covered a lot of territory. Often when he had a call-out he would take off at about 3 am. One of us would give him a cup of coffee or a thermos to take with him and perhaps a bit of toast.

— Olive O'Keeffe, via the Northern Territory Dictionary of Biography (2008)

Soon after arriving in Katherine O'Keeffe met her future husband John O'Keeffe, who ran a butchers shop in the town as well as working at a local hotel (the Sportsman's Arms Hotel). The pair married in September of 1938 and the reception was held at Clyde Fenton's house.

After their marriage O'Keeffe resigned from nursing and the pair moved together to Birdum where they ran the local hotel which was owed by her husbands cousin Timothy O'Shea. During World War II, and after the Bombing of Darwin, O'Keeffe was asked to assist in the medical evacuation of three pregnant Aboriginal women to Alice Springs, one of which gave birth within 20 minutes of her arrival. O'Keeffe made the journey alongside her husband and, afterwards, they decided to remain there for approximately 20 years.

In Alice Springs O'Keeffe and her husband worked as the superintendent and matron of The Bungalow and O'Keeffe also acted as a nurse here until the early 1942 when it was officially closed. When The Bungalow closed it became an Aboriginal Reserve and the O'Keeffe's remained to assist people living there, the site was originally intended to only accommodate temporary visitors but soon became many peoples semi-permanent home. This caused issues for the O'Keefe's as the facilities were not sufficient and they lobbied the government to improve them. They remained there until 1949 when O'Keeffe took on running the 'Native Ward' at Alice Springs Hospital. This ward cared for Aboriginal and Torres Strait Islander patients, mostly those from Central Australia, and could house up to 70 patients. O'Keeffe ran it for many years in, in doing so, earnt great respect from many of her patients.

Reg Harris said of O'Keeffe at this time that she had a great rapport with Aboriginal people and that they had confidence in her; further he stated that:

Aboriginal women in their last stages of pregnancy would admit themselves to her ward but when the baby was on the way they would wander off into the bush which was then quite thick south of the hospital. There they would have the baby with help from their own people, and then roll the baby in the sand to dry it off. Keefy would locate the women after it was all over and provide any further help as required.

— Reg Harris, Legendary Territorians.(2007)

In the 1962 O'Keeffe and John decided to return to Katherine and retire and there they purchased a home which is now known as 'The O'Keeffe Residence' which is now a National Trust property which operates as a museum. O'Keeffe was soon encouraged to be back at work to help address nursing staff shortages in the small town and worked again at Katherine Hospital until 1976 when she left to care for her husband who was unwell. When he recovered she returned to work for a short time, again encouraged by staff shortage, but soon had to leave when the authorities discovered her age.

She died on 16 November 1988 in Katherine.

== Awards and honours ==
O'Keeffe received a Member of the Order of the British Empire in 1965 for her contribution to nursing, particularly in relation to her care of Aboriginal people with tuberculosis in Alice Springs.
