= Fenton Airfield =

World War II airfield

- Douglas-Daly, Northern Territory, Australia Fenton Airfield (Northern Territory)

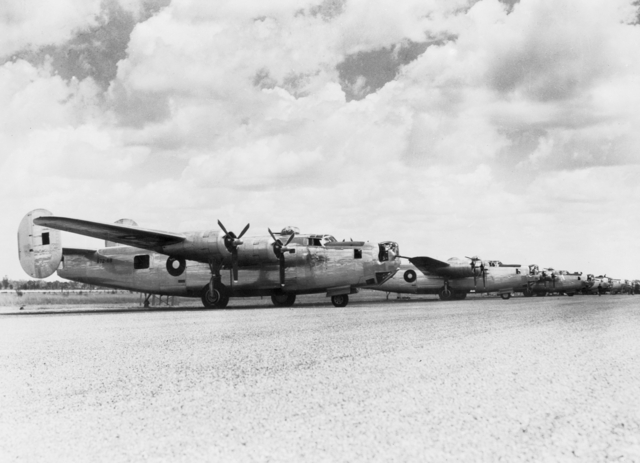
- Australian B-24 Liberators at Fenton in March 1945

Site information
- Type: Military airfield

Location
- Coordinates: 13°37′23.46″S 131°20′19.60″E

Site history
- In use: 1942-1945

Fenton Airfield was a World War II military airfield in the Northern Territory of Australia located at Tipperary Station in what is now the locality of Douglas-Daly and named after Flight Lieutenant Clyde Fenton.

Abandoned since 1945, the site is one of three surviving World War II-era heavy bomber airfields in the Katherine–Darwin region. The airfield is open to the public, and the main runway, taxiways and hardstands are accessible. Remnants of the control tower remain and aircraft wreckage can be found in the area.

== History ==
The airfield was built by C Company and HQ Detachment of the 808th Engineer Aviation Battalion between 27 April 1942 and 16 July 1942. The single runway was 6,000 ft × 100 ft (1,829 m × 30 m). Further development of the airfield was undertaken by No. 1 Airfield Construction Squadron RAAF, No 14 Airfield Construction Squadron RAAF and the Department of Main Roads (New South Wales) under the Allied Works Council. The runway was enlarged to approximately 7,218 ft × 164 ft (2,200 m × 50 m), accommodating close to sixty aircraft dispersal bays, some with earthen revetments. It was named after Flight Lieutenant Clyde Fenton, a RAAF officer who recommended the site for the airfield.

Fenton Airfield was mainly used by Liberator bombers mounting long range raids against Japanese forces in the Netherlands East Indies, the northwestern area of operations, and the South West Pacific Area.

During its operational use, Fenton Airfield served as headquarters for Royal Australian Air Force squadrons and United States Army and Air Force units. Reconnaissance flights beginning at Fenton Airfield were flown over Timor Island, New Guinea and Celebes Islands, and attacks and armed reconnaissance missions were carried out against Japanese airfields, ground installations and shipping. On 29 February 1944 the USAAF 380th Bombardment Group flew a 16-hour mission from Fenton to Borneo, flying over 2,500 nautical miles (4,600 km; 2,900 mi).

The airfield was abandoned at the end of World War II. Over the years, it has reverted to the natural terrain from which it was built. The base infrastructure is gone; only concrete, building foundations, piles of rubble and occasional aircraft parts remain. In aerial photographs, the remains of some roads that likely led to dispersed parts of the base, such as the bomb dump and the administrative containment area, are faintly visible, but no structures remain.

Long Airfield was listed on the now-defunct Register of the National Estate on 25 March 1986 and on the Northern Territory Heritage Register on 11 September 1996.

=== Units based at Fenton Airfield ===
- No. 1 Airfield Construction Squadron RAAF
- No. 6 Repair and Salvage Unit RAAF
- No. 11 Signals Unit RAAF
- No. 14 Airfield Construction Squadron RAAF
- No. 21 Squadron RAAF (B-24)
- No. 23 Squadron RAAF (B-24)
- No. 24 Squadron RAAF (B-24)
- 82nd Wing RAAF (No.'s 21, 23 & 24 Squadrons RAAF)
- 133 Heavy Anti Aircraft Battery Australian Army
- United States Army Air Forces Fifth Air Force

64th Bombardment Squadron (43d Bombardment Group), B-17 Flying Fortress 2 August-25 September 1942
43d Materiel Squadron
319th Bombardment Squadron (90th Bombardment Group), B-24 Liberator, 5 February-23 June 1943

Deployed from: RAAF Base Darwin, NT

380th Bombardment Group, B-24 Liberator, May 1943-9 August 1944

528th Bombardment Squadron, 28 April 1943 – 20 August 1944
529th Bombardment Squadron

Assigned to: Manbulloo Airfield, NT, 28 April-7 November 1943
Assigned to: Long Airfield, NT, 7 November-10 July 1944
Assigned to: RAAF Base Darwin, NT, 10 July–February 1945

530th Bombardment Squadron
531st Bombardment Squadron

Assigned to: Manbulloo Airfield, NT, 28 April-5 December 1943
Assigned to: Long Airfield, NT, 5 December-21 July 1944
Assigned to: RAAF Base Darwin, NT, 25 July-1 March 1945

- 808th Engineer Aviation Battalion, United States Army
- 404th Quartermaster Air Depot Platoon, United States Army

=== Japanese Bombing Raids on Fenton Airfield ===
- 30 June 1943 (12:30pm)
- 6 July 1943 (12:02pm)
- 13 August 1943 (9:45pm)
- 13 August 1943 (11:12 pm)
- 21 August 1943 (03:07 am)
- 15 September 1943 (00:25 am)
- 18 September 1943 (03:50 am)

== See also ==
- United States Army Air Forces in Australia (World War II)
- List of airports in the Northern Territory
