= Long Airfield =

- Douglas-Daly, Northern Territory, Australia

Site information
- Type: Military airfield

Location
- Coordinates: 13°34′59.03″S 131°25′23.20″E

Site history
- In use: 1942-1945

Long Airfield was a World War II military airfield located in the locality of Douglas-Daly, Northern Territory, Australia.

Also known as "Long Strip", the airfield was constructed in late 1943 by No.14 Airfield Construction Squadron RAAF. The bitumen surfaced runway was 2,400 ft × 50 ft (732 m × 15 m) wide. Fifty three aircraft dispersal bays with some protected with earth revetments were also constructed. It was named after Pilot Officer Brian E. Long of No. 2 Squadron RAAF, who was presumably killed in action on 17 June 1942.

Long Airfield was generally employed in an associated and support role for nearby Fenton Airfield. The airfield has been abandoned since 1945. Viewed from the air, the remains of the main runway are visible, along with taxiways and aircraft hardstands visible, but in a very deteriorated state. No buildings or other structures remain.

The airfield is accessible by road by traveling south on Stuart Highway (Highway 1) then turning west on Dorat Road (Highway 23), then turning south after about 1.5 km (0.93 mi) on Douglas Road. The airfield lies to the east, after about 3–4 km (1.9–2.5 mi), by crossing some scrubland. A 4-wheel drive vehicle is recommended for the offroad travel.

Long Airfield was listed on the now-defunct Register of the National Estate on 25 March 1986. Long Airfield and some associated facilities were considered for listing on the Northern Territory Heritage Register beginning with a nomination in 2002 and concluding with the lapsing of the nomination in 2013 due to the objections to the proposed listing by the owner of the land.

== Japanese Air Raids against Long Airfield ==
- 14 August 1943
- 15 September 1943 (00:25 am)
- 18 September 1943 (03:50 am)

== Units based at Long Airfield ==
- 529th Bombardment Squadron (380th Bombardment Group), (7 November 1943 – 10 July 1944)
- 531st Bombardment Squadron (380th Bombardment Group), (5 December 1943 – 21 July 1944)
- No. 23 Squadron RAAF

== Operations ==
B-24 Liberators from the 529th and 531st Bomb Squadrons moved to Long Field from Manbulloo Airfield and attacked Japanese airfields, ground installations, shipping, and industries in the Netherlands East Indies and the Bismarck Archipelago. Other missions included disruption of enemy sea channels; dropping photoflash bombs and propaganda pamphlets. Both squadrons were reassigned to Darwin in July 1944.

== See also ==
- United States Army Air Forces in Australia (World War II)
- List of airports in the Northern Territory
