= Qantas Flights 7 and 8 =

Flights between Australia and the U.S.

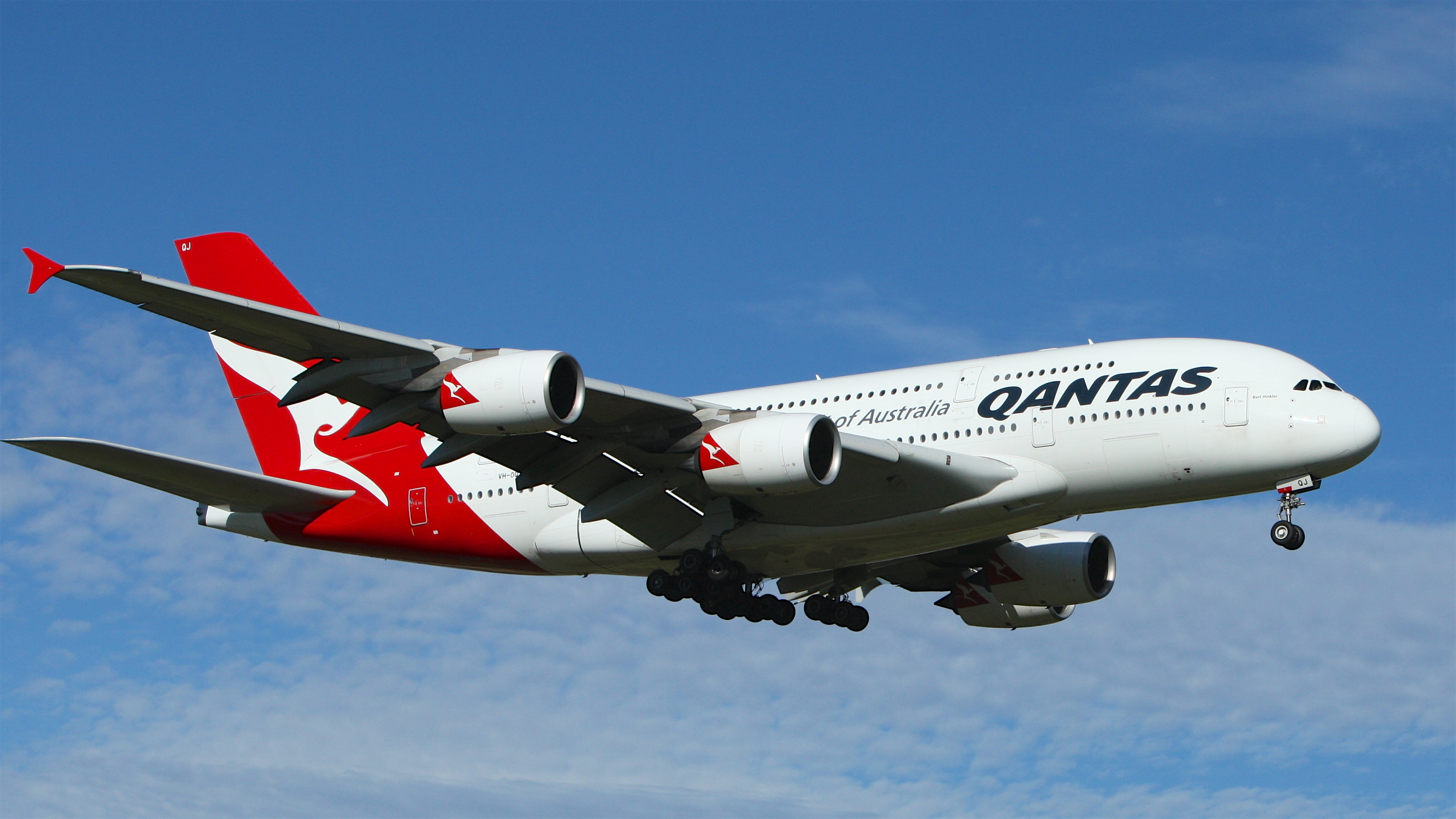
A Qantas Airbus A380-800, the aircraft type that operates these flights as of 2025.

Qantas Flight 7 (QF7/QFA7) (Note: Common abbreviated designation of the flight using the IATA and ICAO airline designators for Qantas: QF & QFA, respectively) and Qantas Flight 8 (QF8/QFA8) are flights operated by Australian airline Qantas between Sydney Airport and Dallas/Fort Worth International Airport, which, from 2013 to 2016, were the longest regularly scheduled non-stop commercial flights in the world. As of July 2024, they are the 13th longest regularly scheduled non-stop commercial flights in the world as measured by great-circle distance (Note: As measured by the distance between the origin and destination airports. Especially on ultra-long haul flights, the exact ground distance travelled by a flight can vary substantially based on daily and seasonal weather patterns, air traffic, and other issues. Therefore, the great-circle distance between origin and destination is the only reliable way to measure the "longest flight by distance".)—13,804 kilometres (8,577 mi; 7,454 nmi), which is over one third of the distance around Earth. (Note: The circumference of Earth is 40,075 km, so 13,804 km is 34.4% of that.)

== Background ==
Qantas and American Airlines (AA) were two of the co-founding members of the Oneworld airline alliance, which was launched in 1999. Dallas/Fort Worth International Airport (DFW) has long been American's headquarters and largest hub and is centrally located in the United States. Dallas is less than four hours flying time from all cities in the continental United States and AA serves more of these airports from DFW than from Los Angeles, Qantas's main gateway to the United States. Los Angeles is also an AA hub, but is significantly smaller in terms of departures and destinations and located 4–5 hours flying time from most east coast cities. In 2012, American operated nearly 500 departing flights daily from DFW, but fewer than 100 from Los Angeles. Dallas would be a logical destination for Qantas to serve, but it only had six aircraft with the 13,804-kilometre (8,577 mi) range needed to reach Dallas and they were needed for the Melbourne-Los Angeles and Sydney-Buenos Aires routes. The Boeing 747-400ER has a range of 14,205 kilometres (8,827 mi), although winds aloft and fuel needed for holding can trim that figure.

Qantas had studied the feasibility of the Dallas route for years. At the time of the Great Recession, Qantas' Sydney-San Francisco service became unprofitable, while an open skies agreement between Australia & the US flooded the market with more capacity. In the meantime, the Boeing 747-400ER aircraft were replaced with A380s on the Melbourne-LA route. According to Qantas CEO Alan Joyce: "a lot of things clicked on this and it made absolute sense for us to devote aircraft resources to this destination." By flying to Dallas, Qantas can offer passengers a 70-minute connection to domestic flights, which means onwards connections to cities like New York City, Chicago, Boston, and Miami can be up to two hours faster than transiting through Los Angeles. At launch, Qantas had codeshare agreements on 54 AA flights from DFW to cities in the US, Canada, & Mexico. When announcing the launch of A380 service, Qantas notes that DFW offers more than 30 codeshare destinations beyond the network available from Los Angeles. Dallas' geographical location in the United States is convenient for citizens of Australia eager to travel to Minneapolis, Detroit, Omaha, and/or Montana, to make a quick connection in Texas to access these states. According to Qantas in 2014, the most popular destinations for connections with QF7 are Orlando, Boston, Houston, Dallas and New York's LaGuardia Airport.

== History ==
=== 747 service to London and Singapore ===
In March 1974, Qantas launched Flights 7 outbound and 8 returning, between Sydney and London Heathrow Airport, via Melbourne, Perth and Bombay. This was unrelated to the other London flights operated by Qantas, with the former Adelaide to London via Singapore being Flights 81 and 82. Initially, Qantas operated the flight pair three times each week using Boeing 747-200Bs, with a journey time of approximately 20 hours. The two flights were promoted as a faster alternative to the daily flight pair of Flight 1 outbound and Flight 2 inbound, also then operated by 747-200B aircraft, but with two or three stops between London and Australia. At the time, Qantas claimed that Flight 8 was the fastest service from London to Sydney of any airline.

During the 1980s, Qantas developed hubs on the Kangaroo Route in Singapore and later Bangkok. By the mid-1980s, Melbourne/Sydney to London flights had reverted to a daily Flight 1/Flight 2 service only, and Qantas was operating other Australia to Europe services, hubbed through Singapore or Bangkok, to Amsterdam, Athens, Belgrade, Frankfurt, Manchester and Rome. Under that hubbing arrangement, Flight 7/Flight 8 was cut back to four days per week Perth to Singapore service, still operated by 747-200Bs.

Qantas eventually abandoned its hub in Singapore, after entering into an alliance with Emirates. Under the new alliance, Qantas operated flights between Australia and London via Dubai, which became a hub for Qantas/Emirates codeshare services to and from other destinations in Europe.

=== 747 service to Dallas (2011–2014) ===
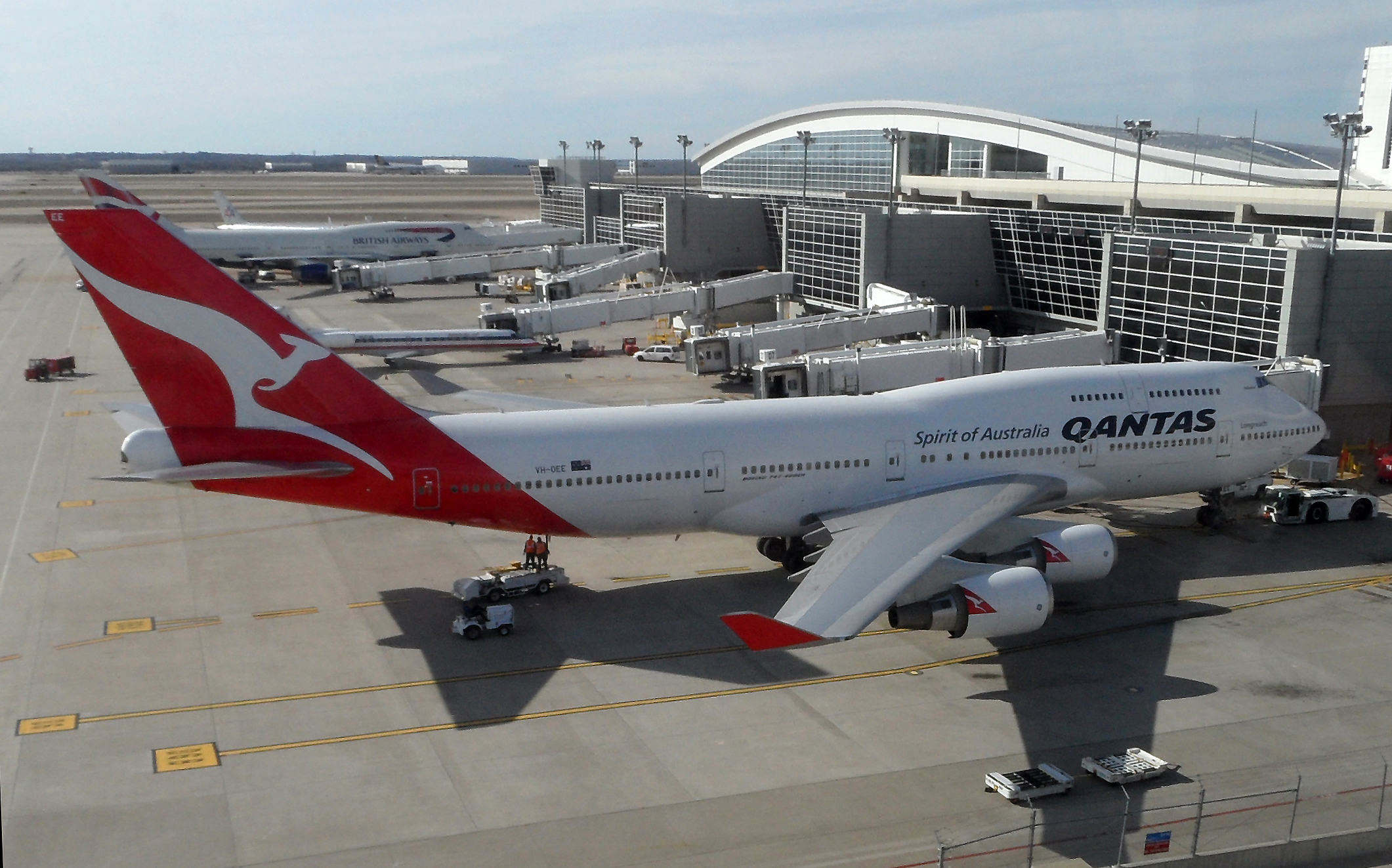
The Boeing 747-400ER previously operated by Qantas parked at Terminal D of Dallas/Fort Worth International Airport.

Qantas began operating the Sydney-Dallas route—designated Flight 7 outbound and Flight 8 returning—on 16 May 2011. The route was initially flown 4 times weekly, but was upgraded to daily service on 1 July 2012. Flight 7, from Sydney to Dallas, flew non-stop in 15 hr 25 min. Due to strong headwinds, Flight 8 could not be flown non-stop and flew from Dallas to Brisbane Airport before returning to Sydney. Flights 7 & 8 were operated with a Boeing 747-400ER aircraft from 2011 until 28 September 2014.

When launched as a service to Dallas, Flight 7 was the longest regularly scheduled non-stop flight by distance operated by a Boeing 747 and the third-longest regularly scheduled non-stop commercial flight by distance—behind Singapore Airlines Flights 21/22 (Newark-Singapore; 15,345 km) and Singapore Airlines Flights 37/38 (Los Angeles-Singapore; 14,114 km). However, unlike the Qantas Boeing 747-400ER, the Singapore Airlines flights were flown with Airbus A340-500 aircraft configured with an all-business class cabin that carried only 100 passengers.

Qantas Flight 7 became the second-longest regularly scheduled non-stop commercial flight by distance when Singapore Airlines stopped flying non-stop between Singapore & Los Angeles on 20 October 2013. The final Singapore Airlines flight from Newark to Singapore departed 23 November 2013, at which point Qantas Flight 7 became the longest regularly scheduled non-stop flight by distance. It held this distinction until 1 March 2016, when Emirates began a 14,203 km non-stop service, EK 448 and EK 449, between Auckland, New Zealand and Dubai, UAE.

==== Incidents ====
The route suffered some setbacks during the first two weeks of operation, which called into question its feasibility. On 21 May 2011, less than a week after commencing operations on the route, Qantas offloaded three containers of luggage in Dallas in order to reach Brisbane without the need to make an unplanned stop for fuel. Affected passengers waited 24 hours for their luggage to arrive via Los Angeles. Qantas claimed they were forced to make the decision "due to load restrictions as a result of unseasonably strong winds." On 23 May, Flight 7 was forced to divert to Houston because it lacked enough fuel to circle Dallas until thunderstorms—typical during summertime—cleared, resulting in a two-hour delay. Then on 30 May, Flight 8 made an unplanned stop in Nouméa, New Caledonia, when its pilots decided it was safer to stop and refuel there then continue on to Brisbane.

=== A380 service to Dallas (2014–2020) ===
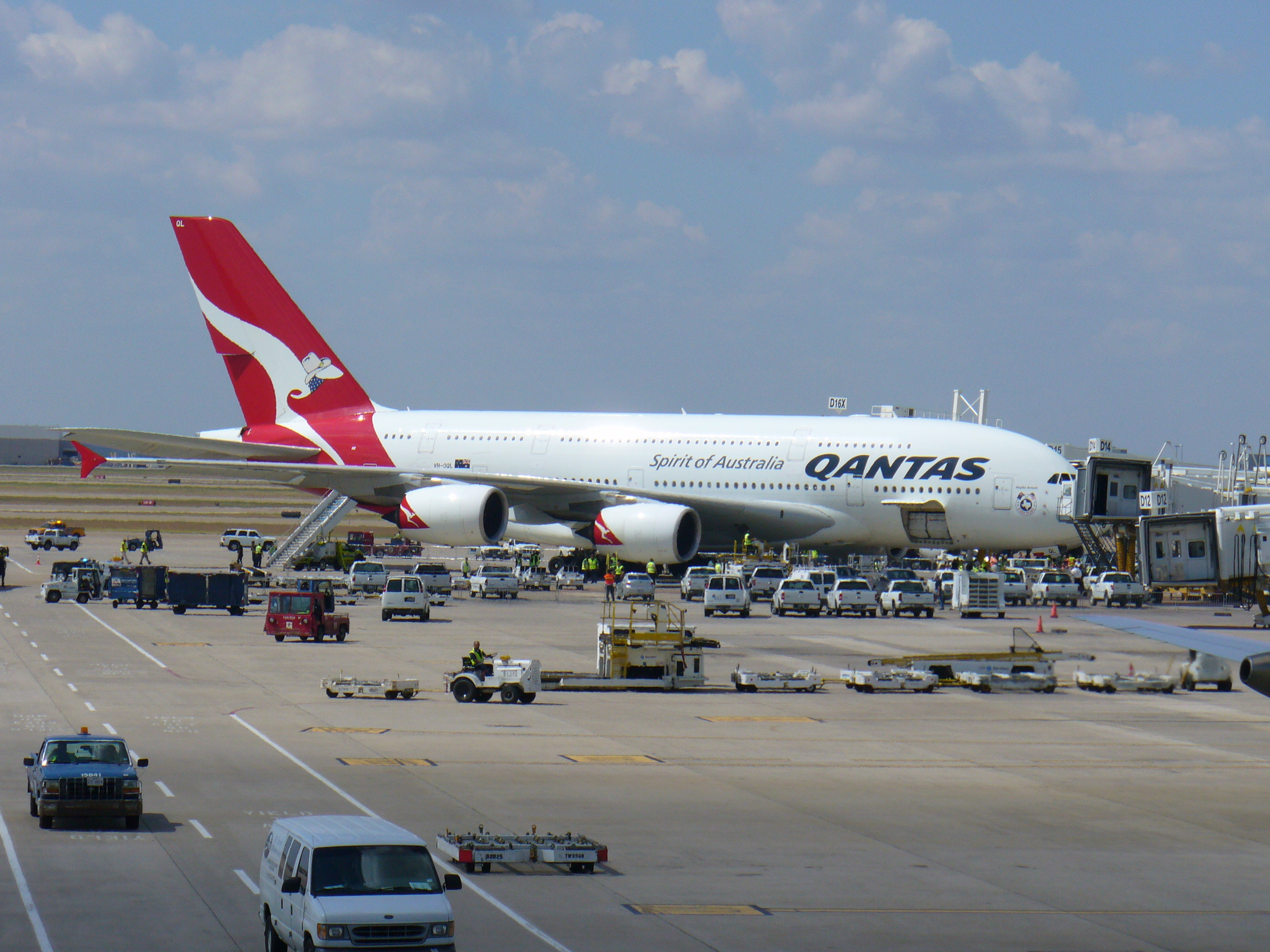
Special livery sported on the inaugural A380 service (VH-OQL)

In May 2014, Qantas announced that Flight 7 and Flight 8 would be operated by the Airbus A380 beginning 29 September 2014, at which point Flight 8's intermediate stop in Brisbane would be terminated. Although frequency was reduced from seven to six flights per week, the larger capacity of the A380 results in an increase in weekly capacity on the route of more than ten percent. The A380s are configured into four classes, and brings the addition of first class to the route.

The first A380 aircraft to operate Flight 7/8 sported a special livery: the kangaroo painted on the aircraft's empennage (tail) wore a white cowboy hat and star-speckled blue kerchief around its neck. The airplane also sported a commemorative seal with the tagline “G’Day Texas.” The hat and kerchief pay homage to the Dallas region's strong association with cowboy culture and the red background, white kangaroo/hat, and star-speckled blue are suggestive of the US flag. With the change in aircraft, Qantas became the first airline to operate an A380 at Dallas-Fort Worth International Airport, although Emirates began flying the A380 to DFW just 2 days later.

The following year on 13 April, Qantas flight 7 diverted to Phoenix Sky Harbor International Airport because there were no available airports nearby and the weather in Dallas wasn't suitable for the plane. However, after a few hours in Phoenix, the weather at Dallas improved and the flight departed Phoenix to continue onto Dallas.

=== COVID-19 pandemic suspension (2020–2022) ===
Due in part to the global response to the COVID-19 pandemic, Qantas suspended most of their international flights in early 2020. QF7/QF8 was suspended in April 2020 until its resumption in February 2022. Qantas announced in their 3 year post-COVID-19 recovery plan, that the A380 fleet was to remain grounded until 2023 at the earliest and "The Boeing 787-9 will become Qantas' international workhorse."

=== B787-9 service to Dallas (2022–2025) ===
QF7/QF8 resumed on 16 February 2022 operated by 787-9s for all upcoming scheduled flights.

=== A380 resumes service to Dallas (2025-present) ===
Qantas resumed A380 service for QF7/QF8 on August 11th, 2025.

== Flight ==
Qantas Flight 7 operates from Sydney Airport (IATA: SYD) near Sydney, New South Wales, Australia to Dallas/Fort Worth International Airport (IATA: DFW) near the cities of Dallas and Fort Worth in Texas, USA. Qantas Flight 8 is the return flight from Dallas/Fort Worth to Sydney. Through a codeshare agreement with American Airlines, these flights are marketed as American Airlines Flight 7261 (AA7261) and American Airlines Flight 7262 (AA7262), respectively. It is one of only two non-stop routes between Australia and a US city beyond the west coast (Los Angeles or San Francisco), the other being United flights 100 and 101, which operate between Houston and Sydney. The flights originally operated six times weekly (every day except Tuesday). but moved to daily flights from April 2016 The A380 aircraft initially deployed on this route are configured in a four-class seating with a 14-seat first class cabin, a 64-seat business class cabin, a 35-seat premium economy cabin, and a 371-seat economy class cabin.

Because of the difference in local times, Flight 7 departs Sydney, Flight 7 arrives in Dallas/Fort Worth, and Flight 8 departs Dallas/Fort Worth on the same day (local time). Since Flight 8 is both an overnight flight and crosses the International Date Line, it arrives in Sydney two days after departing Dallas/Fort Worth. For example, Flights 7/8 departing Sydney on 16 February 2022 was scheduled to fly (local times in bold):

Departs/arrives	Sydney (AEDT; UTC+11)	Dallas (CST; UTC−6)	UTC	Duration
QF 7 departs Sydney	**15:40**; **16 February**	22:40; 15 February	4:40; 16 February	15:20 hours
QF 7 arrives in Dallas	7:00; 17 February	**14:00**; **16 February**	20:00; 16 February	15:20 hours
QF 8 departs Dallas	13:20; 17 February	**20:20**; **16 February**	2:20; 17 February	16:45 hours
QF 8 arrives in Sydney	**6:05**; **18 February**	13:05; 17 February	19:05; 17 February	16:45 hours

Qantas Flight 8 from Dallas to Sydney—with a scheduled duration of 16 hours, 45 minutes—is one of the longest regularly scheduled non-stop commercial flights by scheduled duration.

== See also ==
- Longest flights
- Flight distance records
- Singapore Airlines Flights 21 and 22
