= Flight record =

Flight record may refer to:

- Flight endurance record
- Flight distance record
- Flight altitude record
- Flight airspeed record
- Longest flights
