= Flight 23 =

Flight 23 may refer to:

- Airwork Flight 23, crashed on 3 May 2005
- United Air Lines Flight 23, crashed on 10 October 1933
- Singapore Airlines Flight 23, one of the longest regularly scheduled non-stop flights
