= Flight 24 =

Flight 23 is the name of

- Air New Zealand Flight 24, hijacking incident that occurred on 19 May 1987
- Singapore Airlines Flight 24, one of the longest regularly scheduled non-stop flights
