= Flight 22 =

Flight 22 is the name of

- Piedmont Airlines Flight 22, crashed on 19 July 1967
- Alaska Central Express Cargo Flight 22, crashed on 22 January 2010
- Singapore Airlines Flight 22, one of the longest regularly scheduled non-stop flights
