= Singapore Airlines Flights 21 and 22 =

One of the longest regularly scheduled nonstop flight(s) in the world

Singapore Airlines Flight 21
- Operator: Singapore Airlines
- Distance travelled: 15,344 km (SQ21); 16,600 km (SQ22)

Aircraft properties
- Aircraft: Airbus A350-900ULR (2018–2020; 2022–present); Airbus A340-500 (2004–2013)
- Passengers: 67 (business class); 94 (premium economy); 161 (total)

Flight timeline
- Takeoff site: SQ21: Newark; SQ22: Singapore Changi
- Landing site: SQ21: Singapore Changi; SQ22: Newark

Singapore Airlines Flights 21 and 22 (SQ21/SIA21 and SQ22/SIA22, respectively) are airline routes operated by Singapore Airlines between Singapore Changi Airport (SIN) and Newark Liberty International Airport (EWR). They were the two longest regularly scheduled non-stop flights in the world, until surpassed by Singapore Airlines Flights 23 and 24 (SQ23 and SQ24) between Singapore Changi Airport and John F. Kennedy International Airport (JFK) in November 2020.

The flights were operated from 28 June 2004 to 23 November 2013, using an Airbus A340-500, and again from 11 October 2018 using an Airbus A350-900ULR until operations were suspended on 25 March 2020 due to the COVID-19 pandemic. Two years and two days later, it resumed the service using the same aircraft type.

The flights cover 15,300 to 17,000 kilometres (9,500 to 10,600 mi; 8,300 to 9,200 nmi) for SQ21 and 17,205 kilometres (10,691 mi; 9,290 nmi) for SQ22. For SQ21, flights flew over the Atlantic Ocean, Europe and Asia but often some flights flew in the opposite direction of SQ22's path. For SQ22, flights flew over the Pacific Ocean, Asia and United States.

== Service ==
In June 2004, Singapore Airlines introduced Flight SQ21, using the Airbus A340-500 on a record breaking 15,344-kilometre (9,534 mi; 8,285 nmi) great circle route from Newark to Singapore, passing within 130 kilometres (81 mi; 70 nmi) of the North Pole. Taking a little over 18 hours, Flight SQ21 was scheduled to take off from Newark at 23:00 EDT (11:00 SGT) and land in Singapore at 4:05 SGT (16:05 EDT).

This non-stop scheduled-commercial distance was immediately surpassed by return Flight SQ22, which flew a then-record 16,600-kilometre (9,000 nmi) back to Newark, on a route over Asia and Alaska. Despite the greater distance, Flight SQ22 averaged a slightly shorter 17 hours 45 minutes due to assistance from prevailing high-altitude winds.

== Flight ==
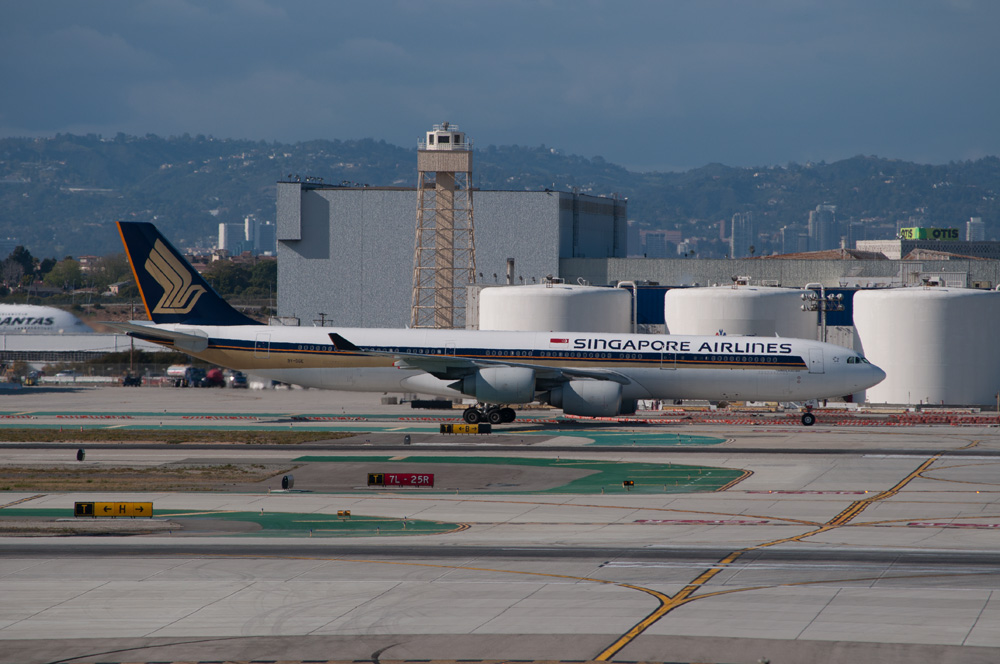
An Airbus A340-500, which formerly flew this route. This aircraft is now in storage.

=== Original service (2004–2013) ===
The plane originally used for the Singapore–Newark route was an Airbus A340-500. It had 14 cabin crew and six flight deck officers, each working four-hour shifts.

The flight required 222,000 litres (49,000 imp gal; 59,000 US gal) of fuel, more than ten times the total weight of all the passengers and crew. Critics said that while there would be reduced noise pollution due to a stop not being required, the non-stop flight would save little fuel due to the need to use more energy at the beginning of the flight to power its heavy load.

The airline said that this route would save four hours off a one-stop service. However, medical experts expressed concerns regarding the 18-hour flight, in which passengers would breathe recycled air with a greater chance of picking up viral infections such as flu and colds on board. Furthermore, the heart and lungs would come under increased strain from a lower than usual supply of oxygen, with an enhanced risk of deep vein thrombosis (DVT) among people who fail to exercise frequently on board. The airline had installed special lockers on the aircraft to store the body of any passengers that died en route, since the flight's routing over the Pacific Ocean and the North Pole meant that there were few, if any, possible unscheduled stops.

Singapore Airlines originally offered 64 business class and 117 Executive Economy Class seats on this flight. SIA phased out the Executive Economy Class in favor of 100-seat all-Business Class flights in 2008.

==== 2013 suspension ====
In October 2012, Singapore Airlines announced that it would discontinue non-stop service to both Newark and Los Angeles in 2013. Revenue was no longer high enough to sustain the service and the routes were dropped in November 2013.

As part of a deal announced with Airbus, the airline would sell back its five Airbus A340-500 aircraft to the aircraft manufacturer while ordering 5 extra Airbus A380 and another 20 Airbus A350 XWB aircraft.

The airline continued serving Los Angeles via Tokyo (Narita) as it had during the period with the non-stop flights. It continued to serve the New York metropolitan area (in which Newark is located) via the nearby John F. Kennedy International Airport, with a stop at Frankfurt Airport.

=== Relaunch (2018–2020) ===
A Singapore Airlines A350-900ULR operating flight SQ21 on final approach to Singapore Changi Airport

On 13 October 2015, Singapore Airlines announced that it had signed an agreement with Airbus to be the launch customer of a new version of the Airbus A350 called the A350-900ULR (stands for "Ultra Long Range"), which according to the announcement would feature "all-new cabin products which are currently under development."

On 30 May 2018, Singapore Airlines announced the relaunch of SQ 21/22 starting 11 October 2018 (Singapore departure), with daily service commencing 18 October 2018. The flights use the Airbus A350-900ULR, a modified version of the standard Airbus A350-900, with fuel capacity increased from 141,000 to 165,000 litres (31,000 to 36,000 imp gal; 37,000 to 44,000 US gal), and with a maximum range of 9,700 nautical miles (11,200 mi; 18,000 km). The A350-900ULR is expected to consume 25% less fuel versus the A340-500. There are 161 seats, comprising 67 business and 94 premium economy seats - there are no economy seats. The re-launched flight to Newark operates as a red-eye flight, with a morning departure from Singapore. The airline finally received the aircraft on 26 September and relaunched the flight on 11 October 2018. These flights are typically staffed with four pilots and 13 flight attendants.

=== COVID-19 suspension (2020) and resumption (2022) ===
On 25 March 2020, due to the COVID-19 pandemic, SQ21/SQ22 operations were suspended and subsequently cancelled.

In November 2020, in an effort to increase cargo throughput, Singapore Airlines launched the even longer non-stop flights SQ23/SIA23 and SQ24/SIA24 using an Airbus A350-900 to nearby New York—JFK that covered 15,349 kilometres (9,537 mi; 8,288 nmi).

On 27 March 2022, Singapore Airlines relaunched these flights with the same cabin class mix.
