= The Granites Airport =

- IATA: GTS; ICAO: YTGT

Summary
- Airport type: Private
- Operator: Newmont Tanami Operations
- Location: Tanami, Northern Territory
- Elevation AMSL: 1,296 ft / 395 m
- Coordinates: 20°32′54″S 130°21′00″E

Map
- Location in the Northern Territory

Runways
Direction	Length		Surface
Direction	m	ft	Surface
11/29	2,336	7,664	Sealed
- Sources: Australian AIP and aerodrome chart

The Granites Airport (IATA: GTS, ICAO: YTGT) is located at The Granites, a large gold mine in the Tanami Desert in the Northern Territory of Australia. A$5.1 million upgrade to the airport was completed in 2012, sealing the runway and allowing all-weather jet operations catering to approximately 950 Fly-in fly-out workers employed at the remote site. Additionally, the Royal Flying Doctor Service also use the airport for aeromedical flights supporting the surrounding region.

== Airlines and destinations ==
Airlines	Destinations
Airnorth	Darwin
Alliance Airlines	Charter: Alice Springs, Brisbane, Darwin, Perth
Fly Tiwi	Darwin

== See also ==
- List of airports in the Northern Territory
