= Longest flights =

Scheduled passenger air journeys

Singapore Airlines A350-900ULR (one of only seven ever produced) operating at John F. Kennedy International Airport as Flight 23, the aircraft flying the world's longest scheduled flight.

Over time, commercial airlines using fixed-wing aircraft have established a number of scheduled ultra long-haul non-stop flights, reducing the travel time between distant city pairs as well as the number of stops needed for passengers travels, thereby increasing passenger convenience. For an airline, choosing to operate long flights can also build brand image as well as loyalty among a set of flyers, therefore competition among airlines to establish the longest flight occurs. (Note: In this article, the state length of a non-stop flight is, unless otherwise stated, the great-circle route.)

== Definition ==
=== Measurement method ===
The length of a flight can be defined in different ways; the most common measure is great-circle distance, the shortest distance across the curvature of the Earth for two airports' ARPs.

As the only measurement that remains consistent between a specific city-pair and unaffected by operational factors, it is the standard used to represent flight distances in commercial aviation and is used by governing agencies like ICAO, flight schedule providers and airlines themselves.

==== Alternative definitions ====
For the sake of disambiguation, other terms used in reference to alternative definitions of "longest flights" (and also incur operational variance) include:

- Flight time – (the total time of a flight's operation) which varies based on multiple operational variables including: headings flown (see ground distance below), equipment capabilities, or even air traffic congestion (e.g., NAT-OTS and airport holding patterns).
  - A subvariant of this is "Flight endurance" which is used in referring to a specific operated flight, usually recorded with observers, specialized equipment, or other such formal arrangements that are not commonly found in commercial flights.
  - Flight scheduled time is another commonly reported figure that refers to the duration of a flight, published by a flight's operator. This is an unrelated/unreliable figure that incorporates further variables by airlines to reflect their operations and manage customer expectations that allow for variation in boarding procedures, anticipated time of day ground congestion, and even time allocated for remote stand operations.
- Ground distance traveled: actual ground distance covered (using routing that is not entirely on a great-circle route and therefore greater). Flights commonly fly non-great-circle routes for operational reasons such as: favorable winds/meteorological conditions, regulatory/political restrictions, safety/equipment constraints (such as ASHTAMs and ETOPS limitations), or even cost savings (optimization of overflight payments).

=== Flight types ===
There are many different types of flights globally operated by different aircraft for different industries and purposes. The term "longest flight" most commonly refers to flights that are commercial, passenger and scheduled, such that the flight details are published and tickets are available for purchase.

While the term "longest flight" most commonly refers to non-stop flights, direct flights with stops (same flight number for the whole journey) might also be compared on some occasions.

== Airliners ==
The longest-range Airbus jetliner in service is the Airbus A350-900ULR, which is capable of flying 18,000 kilometres (11,000 mi; 9,700 nmi) with up to 250 passengers in mixed seating. A standard A350-900 can fly 15,750 kilometres (9,790 mi; 8,500 nmi) with 325 passengers. Airbus is currently developing and testing a ULR variant of the A350-1000 for Qantas which will have a longer range of about 18,500 km (11,500 mi; 10,000 nmi).

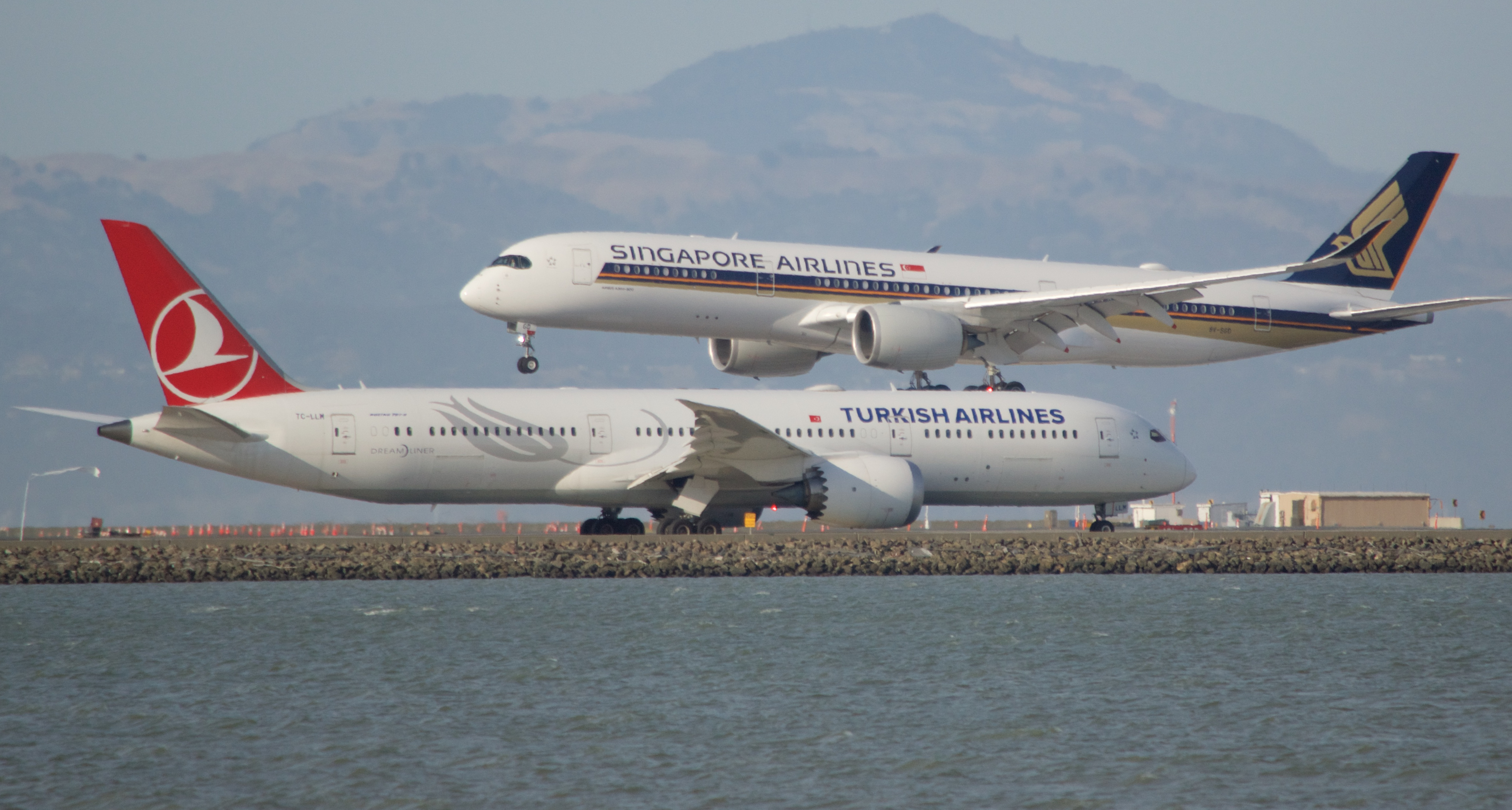
A Turkish Airlines Boeing 787-9 Dreamliner taxiing and a Singapore Airlines Airbus A350-900 landing behind it in San Francisco. Modern wide-body airliners have become increasingly popular on long-haul routes due to their efficiency and advanced engineering. Providing improved performance and optimized operational costs.

The longest-range Boeing airliner in service is the 777-200LR, which can cover 17,395 kilometres (10,809 mi; 9,393 nmi) with 301 passengers. Boeing also considered developing a 777-200LR derivative for Qantas. It would have three additional auxiliary fuel tanks (six total), a lighter interior derived from the Boeing 787 Dreamliner, and lower-density seating, enabling it to fly between Sydney and London with a range of just over 18,500 kilometres (11,510 mi; 10,000 nmi). The announced Boeing 777-8 will be capable of flying 16,170 kilometres (10,050 mi; 8,730 nmi) with 350 to 375 passengers, with the Boeing 787-9 being able to fly 14,140 kilometres (8,790 mi; 7,630 nmi) with 290 passengers.

Many ultra long-haul, non-stop routes that used to be uneconomical are being made viable by the Airbus A330neo, Airbus A350 XWB, and Boeing 787 Dreamliner. For example, Singapore Airlines Flights 21 and 22, launched in 2004, were discontinued in 2013, as operating costs were vulnerable to fluctuations in oil prices. Passenger experience was also different from other routes, because the A340 operated in an all-business-class layout; maintaining sufficient guest traffic and controlling expenses becomes challenging, making the model economically unviable. Flight durations exceed 16 hours and sometimes fuel savings are achieved by taking advantage of the jet stream. Accommodations including specially designed cabins (Stretching zone, sky bar and sleep pod, etc.) and high-speed internet have been introduced accordingly, to set a new standard for long-haul service.

== History ==
In the 1910s, the world's first commercial intercity air routes were operated by airships. With the rise of fixed-wing aircraft, records for longest flights started to emerge. Since the first scheduled commercial passenger flight in 1914 that covered 34 kilometres (21 mi; 18 nmi), records for the longest flight (by great-circle distance) were rapidly set and continue to be set today.

=== 1920s and 1930s ===
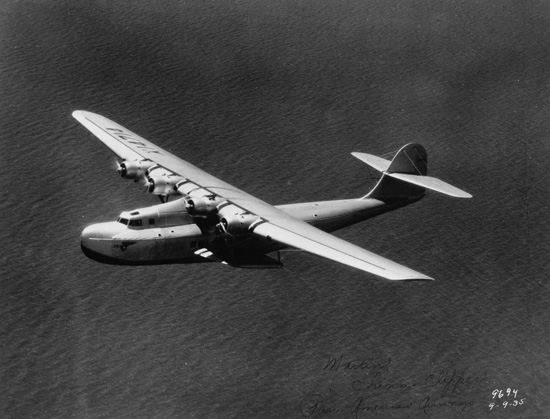
The Pan Am Martin M-130 'Hawaii Clipper' that flew the first commercial transpacific flight

The longest non-stop commercial flights of the 1930s were operated by flying boats, which were the predominant aircraft type of the time for long-range flight, in part because they did not require large airports capable of receiving large aircraft.

- May 23, 1926: Following the end of WWI, there was a boom in the development of longer non-stop commercial flights such as Brussels-Paris (March 1919), London-Paris (August 1919), and Amsterdam-London (May 1920). A notably long passenger flight for the time came with Western Air Express' launch of its scheduled non-stop flight between Salt Lake City (Woodward Field) and Las Vegas (Anderson Field). This non-stop flight covered a great circle distance of 585 km (364 mi; 316 nmi) in approximately 5 hours using a Douglas M-2.
- August 21, 1934: A new record of longest commercial non-stop flight is flown by Pan American Airways using their brand new Sikorsky S-42 Flying Boat between Recife and Sao Luiz, Brazil covering a distance of 1,200 kilometres (746 mi; 648 nmi) in a scheduled time of 5 hours 30 minutes, the longest leg of their Miami-Rio De Janeiro route.
- October 21, 1936: The first scheduled commercial transpacific flight was operated by Pan American Airways on a Martin M-130 Flying Boat with 7 paying passengers on board. Flying from San Francisco to Pearl Harbor, Hawaii, non-stop, a distance of 3,871 kilometres (2,405 mi; 2,090 nmi) in 19 hours, 36 minutes.
- June 28, 1939: The first scheduled commercial transatlantic flight was operated by Pan American Airways on a Boeing B-314 Clipper with 22 paying passengers on board. Flying from Port Washington, New York to Horta, Azores non-stop, a distance of 3,827 kilometres (2,378 mi; 2,066 nmi) in 15 hours, 55 minutes.

=== 1940s and 1950s ===
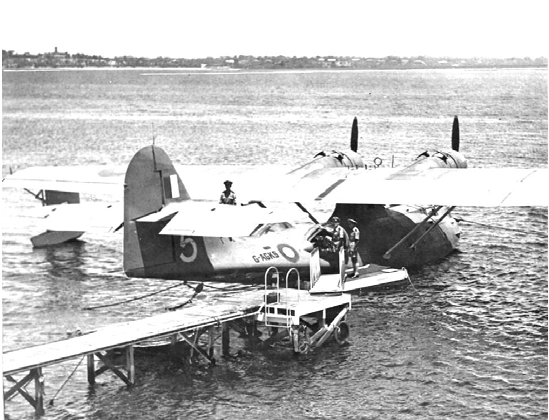
PBY Catalina G-AGKS of the Double Sunrise service

- September 9, 1940: Pan Am set another record for the longest non-stop commercial flight by changing their eastbound trans-atlantic route between Bermuda and Lisbon to no longer have a scheduled stop in Horta, Azores. Using their Boeing B-314 Clipper, to cover ≈5,018 kilometres (3,118 mi; 2,710 nmi) from Darrell Island, Bermuda to Cabo Ruivo Airport, Lisbon, Portugal in a scheduled time of 19 hours and 5 minutes.
- June 29, 1943 – July 17, 1945: Qantas operated "The Double Sunrise", a weekly 5,652-kilometre (3,512 mi; 3,052 nmi) flight between Perth, Australia and Koggala in Ceylon (now Sri Lanka) with average flight times of around 28 hours, using a Consolidated PBY Catalina. The flight from Ceylon to Australia on 30 August 1943, remains the record holder for longest time airborne (for a commercial passenger flight) at 32 hours, 9 minutes. (Note: Note The "Double Sunrise" route continued to be operated from 18 July 1945, until 6 April 1946, by Qantas Liberators (loaned from BOAC) and Qantas Avro Lancastrians, but with shorter flown distances (departing what is now PER, stopping for refuelling at the RAF base at Minneriya, and landing at what is now CMB) and shorter flight times (faster cruise speeds).)
- January 26, 1949 – July 20, 1949: Having their operating certificates revoked and/or airfields closed to them in India, Pakistan, Ceylon, and Burma in response to the Dutch's launching of a second Politionele acties (Operation Kraai); KLM created an alternative route for its direct flight KL830 between Amsterdam and Batavia. Using the longest range commercial airplane at the time: the new Lockheed L-749 Constellation with added additional fuel tanks and reduced cargo. It became the new longest non-stop commercial flight with its longest leg of 5,527 km (3,434 mi; 2,984 nmi) from Port Louis, Mauritius to Batavia, Dutch East Indies (now Jakarta, Indonesia) in a scheduled time of 15 hours, 15 minutes.
- November 18, 1952: Utilizing the recently better understood phenomenon of the Polar jet stream, Pan Am launched non-stop passenger service from Tokyo-Haneda to Honolulu aboard a Boeing 377 Stratocruiser, covering a great-circle distance of 6,202 kilometres (3,854 mi; 3,349 nmi) in 11 hours 30 minutes. It would go on to be flown in as short as 9 hours 48 minutes.
- September 29, 1957: A Trans World Airlines Lockheed L-1649A Starliner, the ultimate piston-engine airliner in terms of range and endurance, flew the inaugural 8,780 kilometres (5,456 mi; 4,741 nmi) Los Angeles to London–Heathrow polar route in 18 hours and 32 minutes.
- October 2, 1957: Trans World Airlines' L-1649A, set the record for the longest-duration, non-stop passenger flight aboard a piston-powered airliner on the inaugural London–Heathrow to San Francisco Flight 801 where the aircraft, having encountered strong headwinds, stayed aloft for 23 hours and 19 minutes covering 8,638 kilometres (5,367 mi; 4,664 nmi).
- October 3, 1957: Trans World Airlines broke their own longest flight record, again using the L-1649A, with the launch of TW850s non-stop flight from San Francisco to Paris–Orly covering 9,001 kilometres (5,593 mi; 4,860 nmi) in a scheduled flight time of 19 hours, 45 minutes.

=== 1960s and 1970s ===
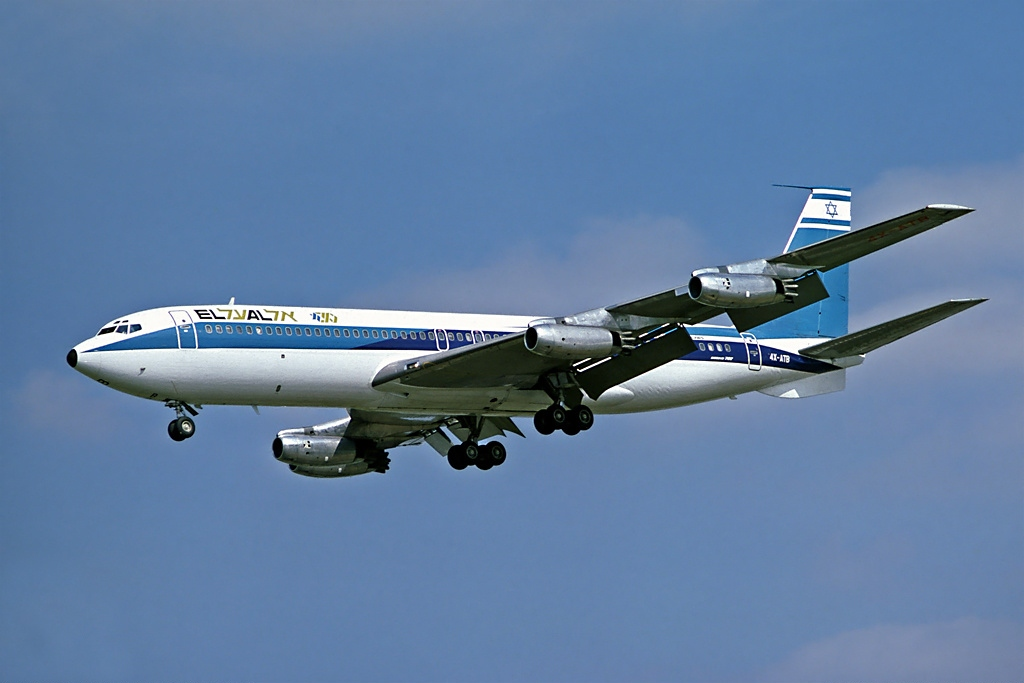
An El Al Boeing 707 (4X-ATB) that flew the longest flight in 1961 between New York City and Tel Aviv

- June 15, 1961: El Al used its new Boeing 707-458s to start the non-stop route from New York Idlewild Airport to Tel Aviv, covering 9,137 kilometres (5,677 mi; 4,934 nmi), with an average time of 9 hours, 33 minutes. This route was previously tested in December 1957 with a Bristol Britannia.
- January 7, 1963: As a result of Cold War tensions and loss of landing permissions on the route's previous intermediary stops, Aeroflot used their Tupolev Tu-114D, the largest commercial passenger plane ever built as of 1963, to change their eastbound route from Havana to Moscow into a non-stop one. Covering 9,594 kilometres (5,961 mi; 5,180 nmi), in 16 hours, 25 minutes.
- August 6, 1967: Aerolíneas Argentinas established its non-stop Boeing 707-320B service on a 10,062-kilometre (6,252 mi; 5,433 nmi) route between Madrid and Buenos Aires, with a flight time of 13 hours. The arrival of the more fuel-efficient turbofans made easier the possibility of longer flights.

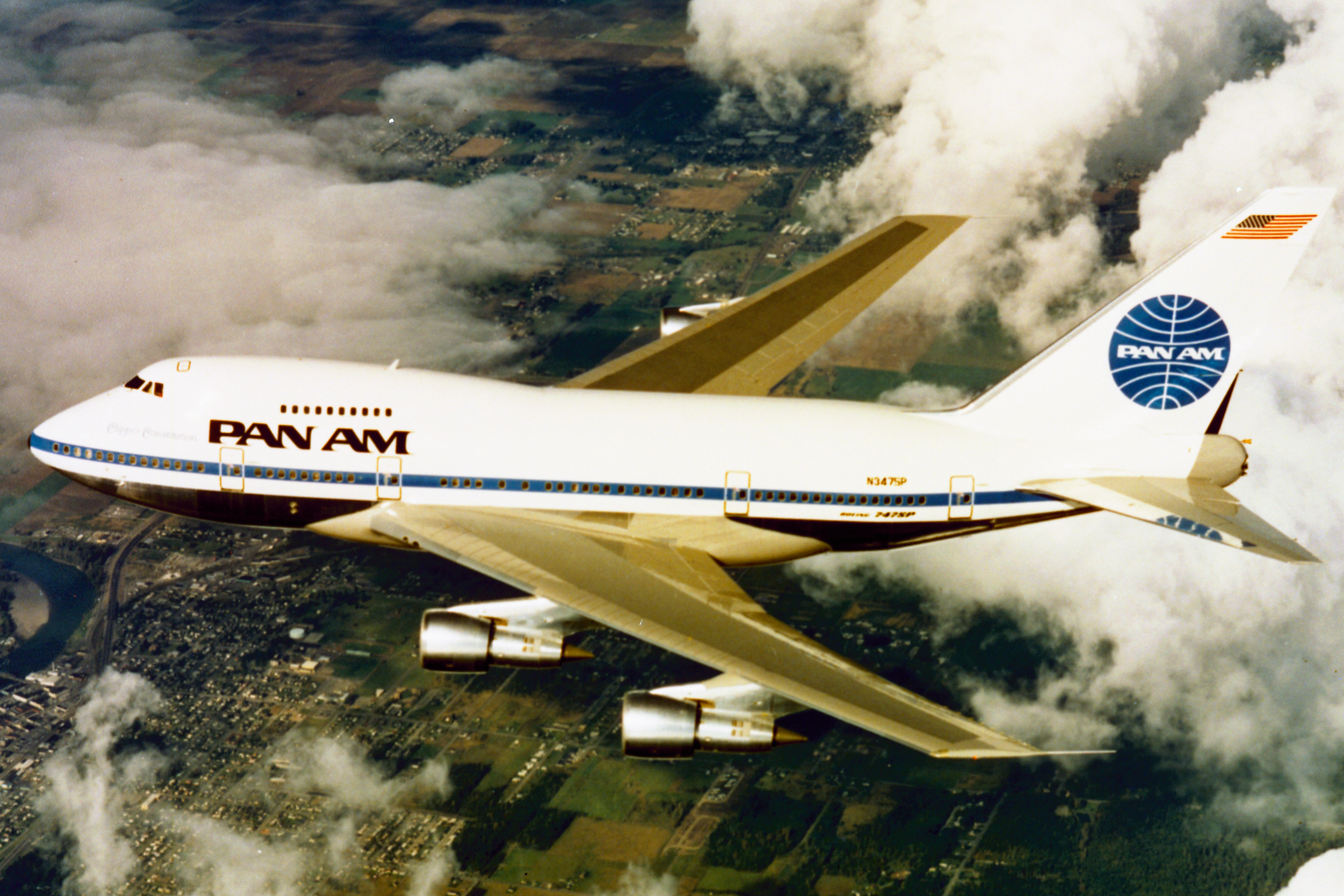
A Pan Am 747SP that operated the longest flight in 1976 between New York City and Tokyo

- April 26, 1976: Using the newly launched Boeing 747SP, Pan American World Airways set a new record with its 10,899 kilometres (6,772 mi; 5,885 nmi) New York–JFK to Tokyo-Haneda route.
- December 12, 1976: Pan Am set another record with its 747SPs when it launched the first non-stop service between North America and Australia, Sydney–San Francisco, covering 11,937 kilometres (7,417 mi; 6,445 nmi) in a scheduled 13 hours 15 minutes.

=== 1980s and 1990s ===
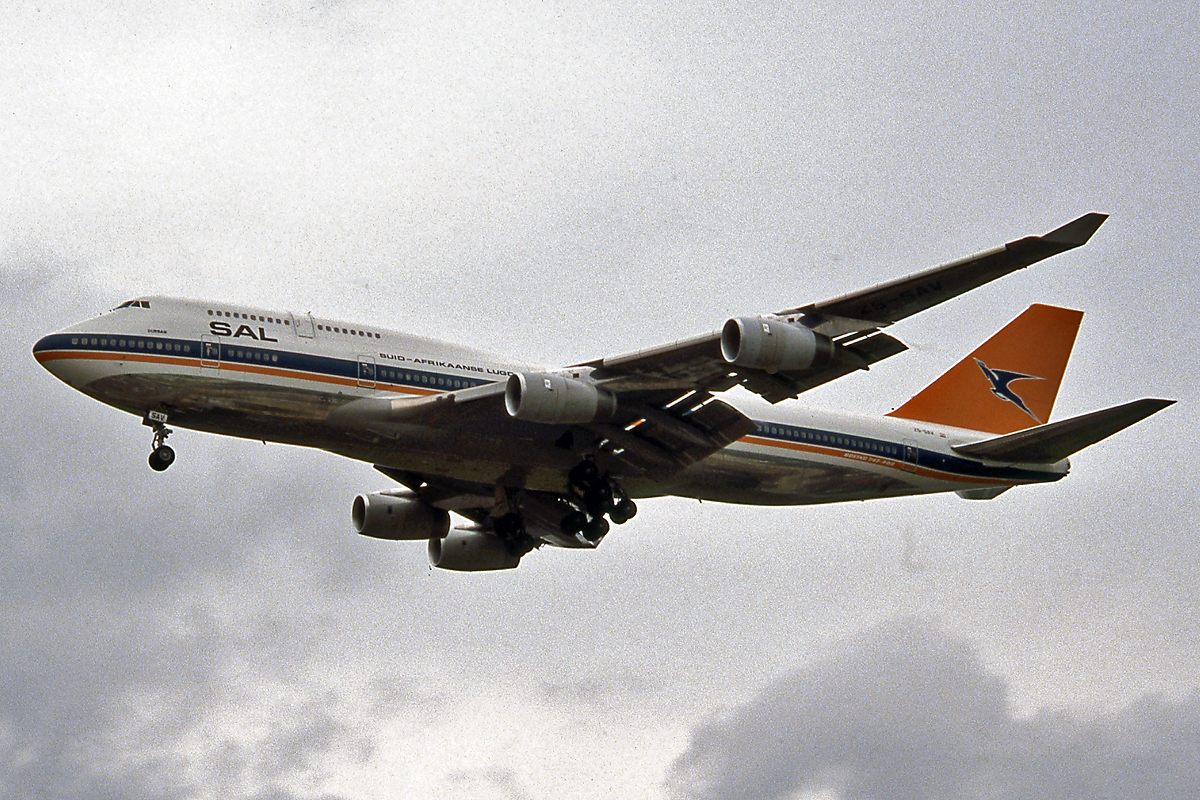
South African Airways' first 747-400, that launched the longest non-stop flight in 1991 from New York City to Johannesburg

- November 4, 1982: Pan Am set a further record using a 747SP to launch its new non-stop route connecting Sydney to Los Angeles, covering 12,051 kilometres (7,488 mi; 6,507 nmi).
- November 3, 1991: South African Airways sets a new record, using a Boeing 747-400 to connect New York–JFK to Johannesburg non-stop (eastbound): a distance of 12,824 kilometres (7,968 mi; 6,924 nmi).

=== 2000s and 2010s ===
In the late 2000s/early 2010s, rising fuel prices coupled with the 2008 financial crisis and the Great Recession caused the cancellation of many ultra long-haul, non-stop flights. This included the services provided by Singapore Airlines from Singapore to both Newark and Los Angeles that were ended in late 2013. But, as fuel prices have since decreased and more fuel-efficient aircraft have come into service, many ultra long-haul routes were reinstated or newly scheduled.

- February 1, 2000: South African Airways set another record, connecting Atlanta to Johannesburg non-stop (eastbound) with a 747-400: a distance of 13,581 kilometres (8,439 mi; 7,333 nmi)
- March 1, 2001: With the dissolution of the Soviet Union, commercial overflights over Russia were now possible, allowing new circumpolar routes to come into use for airlines. Continental Airlines launched a 12,980-kilometre (8,065 mi; 7,009 nmi) non-stop service from Newark to Hong Kong flying Boeing 777-200ER aircraft. This set a new distance record for a round trip route, flown non-stop in both directions. The duration of the non-stop flight exceeded 16 hours.
- April 1, 2001: Within a month, United Airlines started its own New York–JFK to Hong Kong service with Boeing 747-400 aircraft, adding 10 kilometers to the distance for a distance of 12,990 kilometres (8,072 mi; 7,014 nmi).
- February 3, 2004: Singapore Airlines set a new record using the Airbus A340-500 on a distance of 14,113 kilometres (8,769 mi; 7,620 nmi) from Los Angeles to Singapore in a scheduled time of 18 hours 20 minutes carrying 181 passengers.
- June 8, 2004: Singapore Airlines used its A340-500 aircraft to beat its own record; launching Flight SQ 21 on a 15,344 kilometres (9,534 mi; 8,285 nmi) route from Newark to Singapore, passing within 130 kilometres (81 mi; 70 nmi) of the North Pole and taking a little under 18 hours. The return flight SQ 22, then flew a record ground distance of 16,600 kilometres (10,315 mi; 8,963 nmi) back to Newark. Despite the greater distance, SQ 22 averaged a slightly shorter 17 hours, 45 minutes because of prevailing high-altitude winds.
- October 18, 2018: Singapore Airlines relaunched Flight SQ 21/22 between Singapore and Newark using an Airbus A350-900ULR.

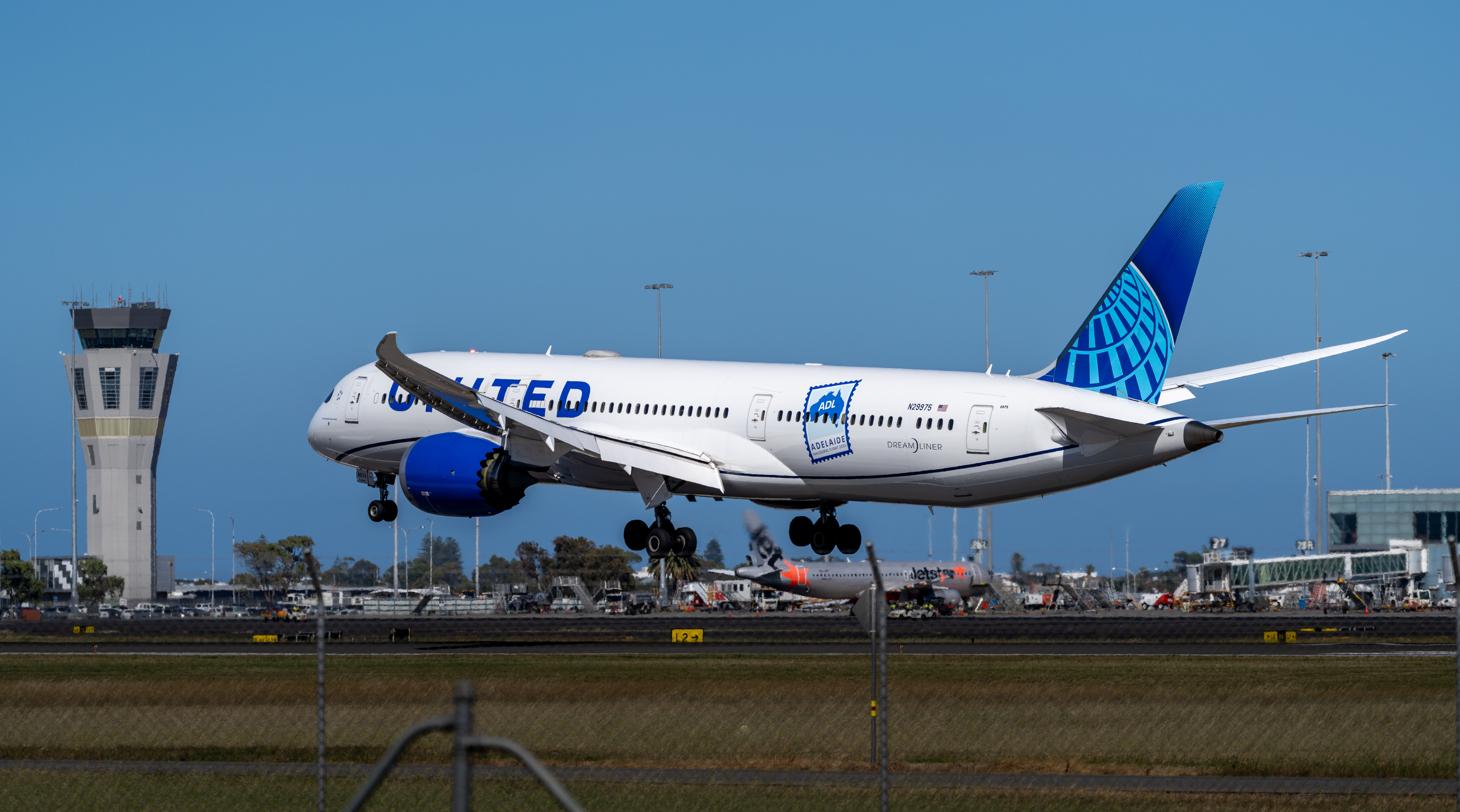
United Airlines Boeing 787-9 on final approach to Adelaide Airport. Such ultra-long-haul services often require aircraft weight restrictions to meet the necessary range for flight.

=== 2020s ===
- March 15, 2020: During the COVID-19 pandemic, which prevented transit through Los Angeles International Airport (LAX), Air Tahiti Nui scheduled and operated, in March and April 2020, Flight TN64 as a non-stop flight between Papeete and Paris–CDG, using a Boeing 787-9 and covering 15,715 km (9,765 mi; 8,485 nmi) in a scheduled time of 16 hours 20 minutes, setting a new record for the world's longest scheduled passenger flight.
- November 9, 2020: Singapore Airlines launched the flight of SQ 23/24 between Singapore and New York–JFK at 15,349 kilometres (9,537 mi; 8,288 nmi) operated by an Airbus A350-900. On 16 January 2021, this route was changed to operate using an A350-900ULR.

== Current longest flight ==
=== By great-circle distance ===
The longest-ever scheduled passenger flight was Air Tahiti Nui flight TN64 using a Boeing 787-9, flying non-stop from Faaʻa International Airport in Papeete, Tahiti to Paris–CDG, a distance of 15,715 kilometres (9,765 mi; 8,485 nmi) in a scheduled duration of 16 hours, 20 minutes. This route was operated from March to April 2020.

This route was previously operated with a refueling stop at LAX, where all passengers would disembark and pass through United States Customs & Border Protection, then re-board and continue to Paris. However, to comply with COVID-19 pandemic restrictions banning European travelers from entering the United States, the airline opted not to stop at Los Angeles in March and April 2020. The route was also made possible by the reduced load of about 150 passengers, which eliminated the need to refuel. This route also set a record for the world's longest domestic passenger flight, as it flew between French territories.

An illustration of the great-circle route versus an optimized jetstream route between San Francisco and Tokyo. The eastbound (to San Francisco) route opts to take a longer route (by ground distance) that uses the jetstream to save time and fuel.

=== By ground distance traveled ===
Routings may avoid great-circle routes, despite their shorter ground distance, for a variety of reasons, such as to avoid headwinds and/or use tailwinds to save time and fuel.

On 9 November 2020, the record for active longest flight (measured by ground distance traveled) was set by Singapore Airlines' flight SQ24 between Singapore-Changi and New York–JFK in the U.S. Both SQ24 and its return flight SQ23 have a geometrically optimal great-circle route near the North Pole of approximately 15,350 km (9,540 mi; 8,290 nmi). However, SQ24 to New York is typically flown a ground distance of around 17,250 km (10,720 mi; 9,310 nmi) over the Pacific Ocean where jet streams can assist, while SQ23 back to Singapore holds the current record for the second longest flight by ground distance as it sometimes opts, instead of the westward polar route, to fly a ground distance of 16,500 km (10,300 mi; 8,900 nmi) eastward, across the Atlantic Ocean, when favorable jet streams winds are available to save flying time and fuel.

Similarly, the two Air India flights from Delhi to San Francisco, AI173 and AI183, fly an eastward ground distance of about 15,110 km (9,390 mi; 8,160 nmi) over the Pacific Ocean instead of the shorter polar great-circle route of about 12,403 km (7,707 mi; 6,697 nmi) to avoid prevailing westerly headwinds and save almost two hours of flying time. Both these flights can travel with some variation in ground distance, with a report of 15,300 km (9,500 mi; 8,300 nmi) for the first such flight in 2016, and it is not unheard of for particular flights to cover more than 16,000 km (9,900 mi; 8,600 nmi).

Cathay Pacific flights from Hong Kong to New York–JFK sometimes fly 15,000 km (9,300 mi; 8,100 nmi) ground routes, instead of a 12,984 km (8,068 mi; 7,011 nmi) great-circle route, for the same reason.

After the Russian invasion of Ukraine in early 2022, aircraft registered in or operated by multiple countries, including the European Union member states, the United Kingdom, Japan, and Switzerland, were banned from using Russian airspace. In response a number of flights from Japan to Europe changed to a polar route over Alaska and northern Canada. For example, Swiss International Air Lines flight LX161 from Tokyo–Narita to Zurich often flies this route, sometimes covering a ground distance of 13,400 km (8,326 mi; 7,235 nmi) or longer, compared to a great-circle distance of 9,618 km (5,976 mi; 5,193 nmi). Others, such as Lufthansa's flight LH716 from Frankfurt to Tokyo-Haneda, instead avoid Russian airspace by flying over the Caucasus, Central Asia, and China.

== Longest passenger flights ==
=== Non-stop flights (top 30, by great-circle distance) ===
The following table lists the world's longest non-stop scheduled passenger routes by great-circle distance. The actual distance flown, however, can be longer than the great-circle distance for a variety of reasons, such as avoiding severe weather, taking advantage of favorable winds aloft, detouring around closed airspace, and diverting around conflict zones.

For the purposes of this table, multiple flights operated by the same airline between the same airports are counted as one flight, while different airlines operating between the same airports are counted separately. Also, each airport pair is counted separately, even though some cities have multiple airports supporting long-range flights (e.g. Heathrow and Gatwick airports serve London, and Haneda and Narita serve Tokyo).

Rank	From	To	Airline	Flight number	Distance	Scheduled duration	Aircraft	First flight
1	New York–JFK	Singapore	Singapore Airlines	SQ 23	15,349 km (9,537 mi; 8,288 nmi)	18:55	A350-900ULR	November 9, 2020
2	Newark	Singapore	Singapore Airlines	SQ 21	15,344 km (9,534 mi; 8,285 nmi)	19:10	A350-900ULR	March 27, 2022 (Note: Service began on 28 June 2004, at which point it was the longest non-stop commercial flight. This flight was operated using an A340-500 in an all business class configuration of 100 seats from 2008 until the route's cancellation on 23 November 2013. The route was revived on 11 October 2018, using an A350-900 operating until 25 March 2020, when it was ended due to the COVID-19 pandemic. The route was subsequently restarted on 27 March 2022, using an A350-900ULR with 67 business class and 94 premium economy seats.)
3	Auckland	Doha	Qatar Airways	QR 921	14,535 km (9,032 mi; 7,848 nmi)	17:10	777-200LR	February 6, 2017 (Note: This flight was previously operated by QR from 6 February 2017 - 19 April 2020, using Boeing 777-200LR aircraft. At the time of its launch (Feb 2017) it was the longest flight in the world. It was resumed by Qatar Airways on 1 September 2023, using the Airbus A350-1000. However, the route eventually switched back to the Boeing 777-200LR in June 2025. Prior to the resumption, flights from Auckland to Doha previously operated with a stop in Adelaide, Australia.)
4	Perth	London–Heathrow	Qantas	QF 9	14,499 km (9,009 mi; 7,829 nmi)	17:30	787-9	March 24, 2018 (Note: The Perth-London Heathrow flight was originally launched on 24 March 2018, it paused its operations during COVID with its last flight operated on 22 September 2021, (and a replacement QF9 flight was subsequently temporarily operated from Darwin). The Perth-London Heathrow route was subsequently resumed on 23 May 2022.)
5	Dallas/Fort Worth	Melbourne	Qantas	QF 22	14,472 km (8,992 mi; 7,814 nmi)	17:40	787-9	December 3, 2018
6	Perth	Paris–Charles de Gaulle	Qantas	QF 33	14,264 km (8,863 mi; 7,702 nmi)	17:10	787-9	July 12, 2024
7	New York–JFK	Auckland	Qantas	QF 4	14,207 km (8,828 mi; 7,671 nmi)	17:50	787-9	June 14, 2023
7	New York–JFK	Auckland	Air New Zealand	NZ 1	14,207 km (8,828 mi; 7,671 nmi)	17:50	787-9	September 17, 2022
8	Auckland	Dubai–International	Emirates	EK 449	14,200 km (8,823 mi; 7,667 nmi)	17:25	A380-800	March 2, 2016 (Note: Service began on 2 March 2016, operated by Boeing 777-200LR between 3 March 2016, and 29 October 2016, before being upgauged to the A380. It was suspended between 29 March 2020, and 2 December 2022.)
9	Shenzhen	Mexico City–Benito Juárez	China Southern	CZ 8031	14,147 km (8,791 mi; 7,639 nmi)	14:55	A350-900	May 11, 2024 (Note: The outbound leg is a direct flight from Shenzhen to Mexico City. The returning leg, however, makes a refueling stop at Tijuana due to wind directions and the reduced takeoff performance due to the high elevation of Mexico City.)
10	Los Angeles	Singapore	Singapore Airlines	SQ 37, SQ 35	14,114 km (8,770 mi; 7,621 nmi)	17:50	A350-900	November 2, 2018 (Note: This route was first launched on 3 February 2004, by Singapore Airlines using an A340-500, at which point it was the world's longest non-stop commercial flight.)
11	Houston–Intercontinental	Sydney–Kingsford Smith	United Airlines	UA 101	13,834 km (8,596 mi; 7,470 nmi)	17:30	787-9	January 18, 2018 (Note: This is a seasonal flight that only operates during the southern summer season.)
12	Dallas/Fort Worth	Sydney–Kingsford Smith	Qantas	QF 8	13,804 km (8,577 mi; 7,454 nmi)	17:00	787-9; A380-800	September 29, 2014 (Note: The date given for the start of Qantas Flight 8 is when it began flying non-stop after switching to the Airbus A380-800 from the Boeing 747-400ER. Previously, QF 8 required a stop in Brisbane, though the eastbound QF 7 from Sydney was always non-stop. The first flight of QF 7 was 16 May 2011.)
13	New York–JFK	Manila	Philippine Airlines	PR 127	13,712 km (8,520 mi; 7,404 nmi)	16:40	A350-900; A350-1000	October 29, 2018 (Note: This route has also been operated by a Boeing 777-300ER at various points in the past.)
14	San Francisco	Singapore	United Airlines	UA 1, UA 29	13,593 km (8,446 mi; 7,340 nmi)	17:10	787-9	June 1, 2016
14	San Francisco	Singapore	Singapore Airlines	SQ 31, SQ 33	13,593 km (8,446 mi; 7,340 nmi)	17:10	A350-900; A350-900ULR	October 23, 2016
15	Johannesburg–O. R. Tambo	Atlanta	Delta Air Lines	DL 201	13,983 km (8,689 mi; 7,550 nmi)	16:50	A350-900	August 1, 2021 (Note: DL201 originally began on 9 June 2009, operated by a 777-200LR. It ended on 20 April 2020, prior to relaunching 16 months later on 1 August 2021, operated by an A350-900. This route was first operated (in an eastbound direction, ATL-JNB only) non-stop by South African Airways with a Boeing 747-400 on 1 February 2000, which was the longest commercial flight at the time.)
16	Dubai–International	Los Angeles	Emirates	EK 215	13,420 km (8,339 mi; 7,246 nmi)	16:20	A380-800	October 26, 2008 (Note: This route has also been operated by the Boeing 777-200LR and Boeing 777-300ER at various points in the past.)
17	Jeddah	Los Angeles	Saudia	SV 41	13,409 km (8,332 mi; 7,240 nmi)	16:10	777-300ER	March 31, 2014
18	Doha	Los Angeles	Qatar Airways	QR 739	13,367 km (8,306 mi; 7,218 nmi)	16:00	A350-1000	January 1, 2016 (Note: This route was primarily operated by the Boeing 777-200LR between 1 January 2016, and 1 July 2020, with some sporadic operation by the Boeing 777-300ER.)
19	Dallas/Fort Worth	Brisbane	American Airlines	AA 7	13,363 km (8,303 mi; 7,215 nmi)	17:15	787-9	October 27, 2024 (Note: This is a seasonal flight that only operates during the southern summer season. Note the westbound part of this route was previously operated by Qantas with their 747-400ER until 29 September 2014, as part of the DFW-BNE-SYD triangle route. This flight is the first nonstop commercial flight eastbound from BNE to DFW.)
20	Perth	Rome–Fiumicino	Qantas	QF 5	13,354 km (8,298 mi; 7,211 nmi)	16:40	787-9	June 22, 2022
21	Doha	Bogota	Qatar Airways	QR 783	13,295 km (8,261 mi; 7,179 nmi)	16:35	777-200LR	November 10, 2026
22	Toronto–Pearson	Manila	Philippine Airlines	PR 119	13,230 km (8,221 mi; 7,144 nmi)	16:15	A350-900	February 2, 2019 (Note: This route has also been operated by a Boeing 777-300ER at various points in the past.)
23	Dubai–International	Houston–Intercontinental	Emirates	EK 211	13,144 km (8,167 mi; 7,097 nmi)	16:20	A380-800	December 3, 2007 (Note: This route has also been operated by the Boeing 777-200LR and Boeing 777-300ER at various points in the past.)
24	Chicago–O'Hare	Manila	Philippine Airlines	PR 133	13,087 km (8,132 mi; 7,066 nmi)	16:40	A350-900	November 9, 2026
25	Cape Town	Atlanta	Delta Air Lines	DL 211	13,084 km (8,130 mi; 7,065 nmi)	16:20	A350-900	December 3, 2022
26	Dallas/Fort Worth	Hong Kong	Cathay Pacific	CX 875	13,072 km (8,123 mi; 7,058 nmi)	17:15	A350-900; A350-1000	April 24, 2025 (Note: Note this route was previously operated by American Airlines from 11 June 2014 - 15 February 2020)
27	Dubai–International	San Francisco	Emirates	EK 225	13,041 km (8,103 mi; 7,042 nmi)	16:55	A380-800	December 15, 2008 (Note: This route has also been operated by the Boeing 777-200LR and Boeing 777-300ER at various points in the past.)
28	Doha	San Francisco	Qatar Airways	QR 737	13,014 km (8,087 mi; 7,027 nmi)	15:30	A350-1000	December 15, 2020
29	New York–JFK	Hong Kong	Cathay Pacific	CX 831/841/843	12,990 km (8,072 mi; 7,014 nmi)	16:10	777-300ER; A350-900; A350-1000	July 1, 2004 (Note: Service on this route previously began on 1 April 2001, by United Airlines using Boeing 747-400 aircraft, at which time it was the world's longest daily non-stop commercial flight. United subsequently ended the route on 1 September 2001. Cathay Pacific formerly operated this route with the Airbus A340-600 and Boeing 777-300ER aircraft.)
30	San Francisco	Adelaide	United Airlines	UA 207	12,987.74 km (8,070 mi; 7,013 nmi)	15:55	787-9	December 11, 2025

=== Direct flights (top 30, by city pair great-circle distance) ===
An illustration of a San Francisco to Singapore "non-stop" flight (green) versus a "direct" flight (purple)

A direct flight between an origin and final destination has an intermediate stop, with all segments having the same flight number and using the same aircraft. In the following table, the "Origin – Destination" column lists the great-circle distance between the origin and final destination, excluding the stop. The "All Sectors" column lists the total great-circle distance between the origin and the final destination, including the intermediate stop.

Rank	Origin	Stop	Destination	Airline	Flight number	Distance Origin – Destination	Distance All sectors	Scheduled duration	Aircraft
1	Shanghai–Pudong	Auckland	Buenos Aires–Ezeiza	China Eastern Airlines	MU 745	19,595 km (12,176 mi; 10,580 nmi)	19,680 km (12,229 mi; 10,626 nmi)	25:30	777-300ER
2	Beijing–Capital	Madrid	São Paulo–Guarulhos	Air China	CA 897	17,578 km (10,922 mi; 9,491 nmi)	17,584 km (10,926 mi; 9,495 nmi)	25:55	787-9
3	Sydney	Singapore	London–Heathrow	British Airways	BA 16	17,016 km (10,573 mi; 9,188 nmi)	17,176 km (10,673 mi; 9,274 nmi)	23:55	787-9
3	Sydney	Singapore	London–Heathrow	Qantas	QF 1	17,016 km (10,573 mi; 9,188 nmi)	17,176 km (10,673 mi; 9,274 nmi)	24:55	A380-800
4	Sydney	Perth	Paris–Charles de Gaulle	Qantas	QF 33	16,941 km (10,527 mi; 9,147 nmi)	17,548 km (10,904 mi; 9,475 nmi)	25:20	787-9
5	Nouméa	Bangkok–Suvarnabhumi	Paris–Charles de Gaulle	Aircalin	SB 500	16,683 km (10,366 mi; 9,008 nmi)	17,621 km (10,949 mi; 9,515 nmi)	25:40	A330-900
6	Sydney	Perth	Rome–Fiumicino	Qantas	QF 5	16,342 km (10,154 mi; 8,824 nmi)	16,638 km (10,338 mi; 8,984 nmi)	23:50	787-9
7	Guangzhou	Moscow–Vnukovo	Caracas	Conviasa	V0 771	16,243 km (10,093 mi; 8,771 nmi)	16,945 km (10,529 mi; 9,150 nmi)	27:30	A340-600
8	New York–JFK	Auckland	Sydney	Qantas	QF 4	16,013 km (9,950 mi; 8,646 nmi)	16,371 km (10,172 mi; 8,840 nmi)	23:05	787-9
9	Paris–Orly	San Francisco	Papeete	French Bee	BF 710	15,728 km (9,773 mi; 8,492 nmi)	15,742 km (9,782 mi; 8,500 nmi)	19:55	A350-900
10	Paris–Charles de Gaulle	Los Angeles	Papeete	Air Tahiti Nui	TN 7	15,715 km (9,765 mi; 8,485 nmi)	15,715 km (9,765 mi; 8,485 nmi)	19:55	787-9
10	Paris–Charles de Gaulle	Los Angeles	Papeete	Air France	AF 26/AF 28	15,715 km (9,765 mi; 8,485 nmi)	15,715 km (9,765 mi; 8,485 nmi)	20:40	A350-900
11	Toronto–Pearson	Vancouver	Sydney	Air Canada	AC 33	15,555 km (9,665 mi; 8,399 nmi)	15,839 km (9,842 mi; 8,552 nmi)	22:35	777-200LR
12	Singapore	Frankfurt	New York–JFK	Singapore Airlines	SQ 26	15,348 km (9,537 mi; 8,287 nmi)	16,488 km (10,245 mi; 8,903 nmi)	22:20	777-300ER
13	Sydney	Kuala Lumpur–International	Istanbul	Turkish Airlines	TK 175	14,967 km (9,300 mi; 8,082 nmi)	14,968 km (9,301 mi; 8,082 nmi)	21:35	A350-900
14	Melbourne	Singapore	Istanbul	Turkish Airlines	TK 169	14,634 km (9,093 mi; 7,902 nmi)	14,705 km (9,137 mi; 7,940 nmi)	20:45	A350-900
15	Auckland	Adelaide	Doha	Qatar Airways	QR 915	14,535 km (9,032 mi; 7,848 nmi)	14,572 km (9,055 mi; 7,868 nmi)	19:45	777-300ER (Note: Qatar Airways previously operated Doha-Adelaide-Auckland routing until 31 August 2023.)
16	Dubai–International	Barcelona	Mexico City–Benito Juárez	Emirates	EK 255	14,345 km (8,914 mi; 7,746 nmi)	14,680 km (9,122 mi; 7,927 nmi)	22:15	777-200LR
17	Mexico City–Benito Juárez	Tijuana	Shenzhen	China Southern Airlines	CZ 8032	14,147 km (8,791 mi; 7,639 nmi)	14,167 km (8,803 mi; 7,650 nmi)	22:25	A350-900
18	Los Angeles	Tokyo–Narita	Singapore	Singapore Airlines	SQ 11	14,113 km (8,769 mi; 7,620 nmi)	14,122 km (8,775 mi; 7,625 nmi)	19:25	777-300ER
19	Christchurch	Sydney	Dubai–International	Emirates	EK 413	14,050 km (8,730 mi; 7,586 nmi)	14,168 km (8,804 mi; 7,650 nmi)	19:55	A380-800
20	Dubai–International	Rio de Janeiro–Galeão	Buenos Aires–Ezeiza	Emirates	EK 247	13,675 km (8,497 mi; 7,384 nmi)	13,879 km (8,624 mi; 7,494 nmi)	20:05	777-300ER
21	Dubai–International	Miami	Bogotá	Emirates	EK 213	13,644 km (8,478 mi; 7,367 nmi)	15,050 km (9,352 mi; 8,126 nmi)	22:25	777-300ER
22	Los Angeles	Hong Kong	Bangkok–Suvarnabhumi	United Airlines	UA 820	13,308 km (8,269 mi; 7,186 nmi)	13,372 km (8,309 mi; 7,220 nmi)	21:30	787-9
23	Los Angeles	Hong Kong	Ho Chi Minh City	United Airlines	UA 152	13,146 km (8,169 mi; 7,098 nmi)	13,172 km (8,185 mi; 7,112 nmi)	20:45	787-9
24	Istanbul	São Paulo–Guarulhos	Santiago	Turkish Airlines	TK 215	13,094 km (8,136 mi; 7,070 nmi)	13,164 km (8,180 mi; 7,108 nmi)	19:10	A350-900
25	Beijing–Capital	Madrid	Havana	Air China	CA 865	12,751 km (7,923 mi; 6,885 nmi)	16,702 km (10,378 mi; 9,018 nmi)	23:30	787-9
26	Mumbai–Shivaji	London–Heathrow	Toronto–Pearson	Air Canada	AC 857	12,513 km (7,775 mi; 6,756 nmi)	12,944 km (8,043 mi; 6,989 nmi)	18:40	787-8
27	Dhaka	Rome–Fiumicino	Toronto–Pearson	Biman Bangladesh Airlines	BG 305	12,459 km (7,742 mi; 6,727 nmi)	14,437 km (8,971 mi; 7,795 nmi)	19:40	787–9
28	Mexico City–Benito Juárez	Puerto Vallarta	Beijing–Capital	Hainan Airlines	HU 7926	12,455 km (7,739 mi; 6,725 nmi)	12,669 km (7,872 mi; 6,841 nmi)	17:50	787–9
29	Addis Ababa	Rome–Fiumicino	Atlanta	Ethiopian Airlines	ET 518	12,397 km (7,703 mi; 6,694 nmi)	12,578 km (7,816 mi; 6,792 nmi)	18:00	787-8
30	Caracas	Bogota	Doha	Qatar Airways	QR 783	12,280 km (7,630 mi; 6,631 nmi)	14,519 km (9,022 mi; 7,840 nmi)	18:20	777-200LR

=== Discontinued non-stop flights (top 30, by great-circle distance) ===
Rank	From	To	Airline	Flight number	Distance	Scheduled duration	Aircraft	Final flight
1	Papeete	Paris–Charles de Gaulle	Air Tahiti Nui	TN 64	15,715 km (9,765 mi; 8,485 nmi)	16:20	787-9	April 19, 2020
2	New York–JFK	Bangkok–Suvarnabhumi	Thai Airways International	TG 793	13,965 km (8,677 mi; 7,540 nmi)	17:45	A340-500; A340-600	July 1, 2008
3	Darwin	London–Heathrow	Qantas	QF 1, QF 9	13,872 km (8,620 mi; 7,490 nmi)	17:25	A380-800; 787-9	June 18, 2022
4	Melbourne	Tel Aviv	El Al	LY 86	13,736 km (8,535 mi; 7,417 nmi)	17:45	787-9	April 2, 2020 (Note: In 2019, El Al, had announced 3 scheduled "trial flights" TLV-MEL and tickets were placed on sale, however due to the travel restrictions caused by the COVID-19 Pandemic, they only operated the first of the three planned flights but still on a commercial basis, not as a repatriation flight (TLV-PER two weeks prior followed by TLV-MEL in April). This route continues to be examined for future operation by El Al, see Envisioned services)
5	Mumbai–Shivaji	Atlanta	Delta Air Lines	DL 185	13,696 km (8,510 mi; 7,395 nmi)	17:55	777-200LR	October 21, 2009 (Note: This was the longest flight ever operated by Delta Air Lines.)
6	Abu Dhabi	Los Angeles	Etihad Airways	EY 171	13,502 km (8,390 mi; 7,290 nmi)	16:40	777-200LR; 777-300ER; A340-500	April 20, 2020
7	Los Angeles	Bangkok–Suvarnabhumi	Thai Airways International	TG 795	13,309 km (8,270 mi; 7,186 nmi)	17:20	A340-500; A340-600	April 30, 2012
8	Hyderabad	Chicago–O'Hare	Air India	AI 107	13,301 km (8,265 mi; 7,182 nmi)	16:45	777-200LR	March 25, 2022
9	Vancouver	Melbourne	Air Canada	AC 37	13,183 km (8,192 mi; 7,118 nmi)	16:20	787-9	March 27, 2020
10	Chicago–O'Hare	Auckland	Air New Zealand	NZ 27	13,170 km (8,183 mi; 7,111 nmi)	16:30	787-9	March 29, 2024
11	Abu Dhabi	San Francisco	Etihad Airways	EY 183	13,129 km (8,158 mi; 7,089 nmi)	16:00	777-200LR	October 28, 2017
12	Washington–Dulles	Hong Kong–Chek Lap Kok	Cathay Pacific	CX 861	13,121 km (8,153 mi; 7,085 nmi)	15:55	A350-1000	February 14, 2020
13	Johannesburg–O. R. Tambo	Washington–Dulles	South African Airways	SA 208	13,091 km (8,134 mi; 7,069 nmi)	16:50	A340-600	April 30, 2009
14	Abu Dhabi	Dallas/Fort Worth	Etihad Airways	EY 161	12,990 km (8,072 mi; 7,014 nmi)	16:30	777-200LR	March 24, 2018
15	Newark	Hong Kong–Chek Lap Kok	United Airlines	UA 17	12,980 km (8,065 mi; 7,009 nmi)	16:00	777-200ER; 777-300ER	February 4, 2020 (Note: This route continues to be scheduled with tickets on sale, even though it has not operated in several years. It is not expected that this route will resume operation in the near future due to the ban on American carriers using Russian airspace, which is needed for this route.)
15	Newark	Hong Kong–Chek Lap Kok	Cathay Pacific	CX 899	12,980 km (8,065 mi; 7,009 nmi)	16:00	777-300ER; A350-900	February 10, 2020
16	Shanghai–Pudong	Mexico City–Benito Juárez	Aeroméxico	AM 99	12,916 km (8,026 mi; 6,974 nmi)	15:10	787-8; 787-9	December 14, 2019
17	Johannesburg–O. R. Tambo	New York–JFK	South African Airways	SA 203	12,824 km (7,968 mi; 6,924 nmi)	16:00	A340-600; A350-900	March 19, 2020
18	Detroit	Hong Kong–Chek Lap Kok	Delta Air Lines	DL 187	12,645 km (7,857 mi; 6,828 nmi)	15:45	777-200LR	August 30, 2012
19	Dubai–International	Fort Lauderdale	Emirates	EK 213	12,594 km (7,826 mi; 6,800 nmi)	15:50	777-200LR	March 12, 2020 (Note: EK 213 now operates to nearby Miami International Airport with the Boeing 777-300ER aircraft.)
20	Taipei–Taoyuan	Newark	EVA Air	BR 32	12,552 km (7,799 mi; 6,778 nmi)	14:45	777-300ER	October 29, 2011 (Note: BR 32 now operates to nearby John F. Kennedy International Airport also with the Boeing 777-300ER aircraft.)
21	Chicago–O'Hare	Hong Kong–Kai Tak	United Airlines	UA 895	12,534 km (7,788 mi; 6,768 nmi)	15:50	747-400	July 5, 1998 (Note: This was the world's longest flight from its commencement in 1996 until its cancellation in 1998. Now operates to nearby Hong Kong International Airport with the Boeing 777-200ER aircraft.)
22	London–Heathrow	Denpasar	Garuda Indonesia	GA 87	12,528 km (7,785 mi; 6,765 nmi)	15:35	777-300ER	October 8, 2019
23	Cape Town	Fort Lauderdale	South African Airways	SA 203	12,342 km (7,669 mi; 6,664 nmi)	15:30	747-400	April 28, 2002
24	Cape Town	Miami	South African Airways	SA 203	12,340 km (7,668 mi; 6,663 nmi)	15:30	747-400	January 29, 2000
25	Atlanta	Shanghai–Pudong	Delta Air Lines	DL 185	12,326 km (7,659 mi; 6,656 nmi)	15:55	777-200ER; 777-200LR	January 30, 2020
26	Lomé	Los Angeles	Ethiopian Airlines	ET 504	12,287 km (7,635 mi; 6,634 nmi)	15:25	787-8	February 13, 2019
27	Dubai–International	Atlanta	Delta Air Lines	DL 7	12,230 km (7,599 mi; 6,604 nmi)	15:45	777-200LR	February 11, 2016
28	New York–JFK	Chongqing	Hainan Airlines	HU 416	12,214 km (7,589 mi; 6,595 nmi)	15:10	787-9	February 1, 2020
29	Abu Dhabi	São Paulo–Guarulhos	Etihad Airways	EY 191	12,122 km (7,532 mi; 6,545 nmi)	15:00	777-200LR; 777-300ER; A340-500; A340-600	March 25, 2017
30	Minneapolis/Saint Paul	Hong Kong–Kai Tak	Northwest Airlines	NW 97	12,062 km (7,495 mi; 6,513 nmi)	15:00	747-400	July 5, 1998

== Longest passenger flights (by aircraft type) ==
The sections below gives two separate views. The first one lists all the commercial passenger aircraft types and their currently scheduled and operating longest non-stop flight. The second section lists the longest non-stop flight ever regularly scheduled and operated by that commercial passenger aircraft type.

=== Current ===
The table below lists the current longest (by great-circle distance) non-stop flights operated by different types of aircraft.

Aircraft	Type	Origin	Destination	Distance	Scheduled duration	Airline	Flight
Airbus A220-100	Narrow-body Jetliner	Austin	Seattle/Tacoma	2,849 km (1,770 mi; 1,538 nmi)	4:52	Delta Air Lines	DL 780, DL 831
Airbus A220-300	Narrow-body Jetliner	Tallinn	Tenerife South	4,689 km (2,914 mi; 2,532 nmi)	6:50	airBaltic	BT 881
Airbus A300-600	Wide-body Jetliner	Mashhad	Istanbul	2,729 km (1,696 mi; 1,474 nmi)	3:30	Iran Airtour	B9 9734
Airbus A310	Wide-body Jetliner	Tehran–Imam Khomeini	Kuala Lumpur–International	6,334 km (3,936 mi; 3,420 nmi)	8:00	Iran Airtour	IRB 9774
Airbus A318	Narrow-body Jetliner	Paris–Charles de Gaulle	Lisbon	1,460 km (907 mi; 788 nmi)	2:35	Air France	AF 1024, AF 1624
Airbus A319	Narrow-body Jetliner	Irkutsk	St Petersburg	4,446 km (2,763 mi; 2,401 nmi)	6:30	Rossiya	SU 6002
Airbus A319neo	Narrow-body Jetliner	Guangzhou	Ürümqi	3,278 km (2,037 mi; 1,770 nmi)	5:30	China Southern Airlines	CZ 6888
Airbus A320	Narrow-body Jetliner	São Paulo–Guarulhos	Bogotá	4,326 km (2,688 mi; 2,336 nmi)	6:10	Avianca, LATAM Airlines	AV 161/185/249, LA 4904
Airbus A320neo	Narrow-body Jetliner	Blagoveshchensk	Moscow–Domodedovo	5,620 km (3,492 mi; 3,035 nmi)	8:20	S7 Airlines	S7 3062
Airbus A320neo	Narrow-body Jetliner	Blagoveshchensk	Moscow–Domodedovo	5,620 km (3,492 mi; 3,035 nmi)	8:15	Ural Airlines	U6 350
Airbus A321	Narrow-body Jetliner	Boston	San Francisco	4,352 km (2,704 mi; 2,350 nmi)	6:51	JetBlue	B6 133/333/733/1833
Airbus A321neo	Narrow-body Jetliner	Brisbane	Manila	5,789 km (3,597 mi; 3,126 nmi)	7:19	Philippine Airlines	PR 222
Airbus A321LR	Narrow-body Jetliner	Copenhagen	Washington–Dulles	6,557 km (4,074 mi; 3,540 nmi)	9:15	SAS Scandinavian Airlines	SK 925
Airbus A321XLR	Narrow-body Jetliner	Mumbai	Amsterdam	6,866 km (4,266 mi; 3,707 nmi)	10:15	IndiGo	6E 21
Airbus A330-200	Wide-body Jetliner	Los Angeles	Brisbane	11,525 km (7,161 mi; 6,223 nmi)	14:45	Qantas	QF 16
Airbus A330-300	Wide-body Jetliner	Vancouver	Hong Kong	10,287 km (6,392 mi; 5,555 nmi)	13:55	Hong Kong Airlines	HX 81
Airbus A330-800	Wide-body Jetliner	Kuwait City	Casablanca	5,247 km (3,260 mi; 2,833 nmi)	8:00	Kuwait Airways	KU 123
Airbus A330-900	Wide-body Jetliner	Kuala Lumpur-International	Algiers	10,564 km (6,564 mi; 5,704 nmi)	14:45	Air Algérie	AH 3157
Airbus A340-300	Wide-body Jetliner	Liberia	Zurich	9,455 km (5,875 mi; 5,105 nmi)	10:45	Edelweiss Air	WK 38
Airbus A340-600	Wide-body Jetliner	Caracas	Moscow–Vnukovo	9,921 km (6,165 mi; 5,357 nmi)	13:05	Conviasa	V0 770
Airbus A350-900	Wide-body Jetliner	Shenzhen	Mexico City–Benito Juárez	14,147 km (8,791 mi; 7,639 nmi)	16:00	China Southern	CZ 8031
Airbus A350-900ULR	Wide-body Jetliner	New York–JFK	Singapore	15,349 km (9,537 mi; 8,288 nmi)	18:40	Singapore Airlines	SQ 23
Airbus A350-1000	Wide-body Jetliner	New York–JFK	Manila	13,712 km (8,520 mi; 7,404 nmi)	17:20	Philippine Airlines	PR 127
Airbus A380	Wide-body Jetliner	Auckland	Dubai–International	14,200 km (8,823 mi; 7,667 nmi)	17:10	Emirates	EK 449
ATR 42	Regional Turboprop	Resolute	Iqaluit	1,581 km (982 mi; 854 nmi)	3:40	Canadian North	882
ATR 72	Regional Turboprop	Totegegie	Papeete	1,655 km (1,028 mi; 894 nmi)	4:00	Air Tahiti	VT 952/953/954/955
Boeing 717	Narrow-body Jetliner	Newark	Minneapolis/Saint Paul	1,623 km (1,008 mi; 876 nmi)	3:10	Delta Air Lines	DL 1641/2242/2864/2866/2895
Boeing 737-200	Narrow-body Jetliner	Yellowknife	Resolute	1,560 km (969 mi; 842 nmi)	2:35	Canadian North (charter)	MPE 9201
Boeing 737-300	Narrow-body Jetliner	Edmonton	West Palm Beach	4,047 km (2,515 mi; 2,185 nmi)	5:35	Canadian North (charter)	MPE 9750
Boeing 737-500	Narrow-body Jetliner	Kabul	Istanbul	3,602 km (2,238 mi; 1,945 nmi)	6:00	Ariana Afghan Airlines	FG 719
Boeing 737-600	Narrow-body Jetliner	Moscow–Sheremetyevo	Algiers	3,337 km (2,074 mi; 1,802 nmi)	4:55	Air Algérie	AH 3001
Boeing 737-700	Narrow-body Jetliner	Yakutsk	Moscow-Vnukovo	4,927 km (3,061 mi; 2,660 nmi)	7:00	Yakutia Airlines	R3 275, R3 473
Boeing 737-800	Narrow-body Jetliner	Buenos Aires–Ezeiza	Panama City–Tocumen	5,331 km (3,313 mi; 2,879 nmi)	7:26	Copa Airlines Colombia	CM 501
Boeing 737-900	Narrow-body Jetliner	Houston–Intercontinental	Seattle/Tacoma	3,016 km (1,874 mi; 1,629 nmi)	5:00	United Airlines	UA 522
Boeing 737-900ER	Narrow-body Jetliner	Anchorage	Kailua-Kona	4,626 km (2,874 mi; 2,498 nmi)	6:26	Alaska Airlines	AS 1312
Boeing 737 MAX 8	Narrow-body Jetliner	Brasília	Orlando	6,079 km (3,777 mi; 3,282 nmi)	8:10	Gol Linhas Aéreas Inteligentes	G3 7602
Boeing 737 MAX 9	Narrow-body Jetliner	Montevideo	Panama City–Tocumen	5,447 km (3,385 mi; 2,941 nmi)	7:32	Copa Airlines	CM 124/284/369
Boeing 747-400	Wide-body Jetliner	Singapore	Frankfurt	10,272 km (6,383 mi; 5,546 nmi)	13:50	Lufthansa	LH 781
Boeing 747-8	Wide-body Jetliner	Frankfurt	Buenos Aires–Ezeiza	11,479 km (7,133 mi; 6,198 nmi)	13:50	Lufthansa	LH 510
Boeing 757-200	Narrow-body Jetliner	Malé	Moscow	6,560 km (4,076 mi; 3,542 nmi)	9:30	Azur Air	ZF 222
Boeing 757-300	Narrow-body Jetliner	Los Angeles	Honolulu	4,113 km (2,556 mi; 2,221 nmi)	6:07	United Airlines	UA 1431
Boeing 767-200ER	Wide-body Jetliner	Dushanbe	Moscow–Vnukovo	3,012 km (1,872 mi; 1,626 nmi)	4:10	Utair	UT 801
Boeing 767-300ER	Wide-body Jetliner	Munich	Houston–Intercontinental	8,718 km (5,417 mi; 4,707 nmi)	12:10	United Airlines	UA 160
Boeing 767-400ER	Wide-body Jetliner	Newark	Honolulu	7,986 km (4,962 mi; 4,312 nmi)	11:12	United Airlines	UA 363
Boeing 777-200	Wide-body Jetliner	Houston–Intercontinental	Honolulu	6,282 km (3,903 mi; 3,392 nmi)	8:42	United Airlines	UA 253
Boeing 777-200ER	Wide-body Jetliner	San Francisco	Sydney	11,937 km (7,417 mi; 6,445 nmi)	16:15	United Airlines	UA 829/863
Boeing 777-200LR	Wide-body Jetliner	Auckland	Doha	14,535 km (9,032 mi; 7,848 nmi)	17:50	Qatar Airways	QR 921
Boeing 777-300	Wide-body Jetliner	Yuzhno–Sakhalinsk	Moscow–Sheremetyevo	6,662 km (4,140 mi; 3,597 nmi)	8:50	Rossiya Airlines	SU 6284
Boeing 777-300ER	Wide-body Jetliner	Jeddah	Los Angeles	13,409 km (8,332 mi; 7,240 nmi)	16:15	Saudia	SV 41
Boeing 787-8	Wide-body Jetliner	Chicago–O'Hare	Addis Ababa	12,194 km (7,577 mi; 6,584 nmi)	13:45	Ethiopian Airlines	ET 575
Boeing 787-9	Wide-body Jetliner	Perth	London–Heathrow	14,499 km (9,009 mi; 7,829 nmi)	17:50	Qantas	QF 9
Boeing 787-10	Wide-body Jetliner	Chicago–O'Hare	Tokyo–Haneda	10,147 km (6,305 mi; 5,479 nmi)	13:35	United Airlines	UA 881
Bombardier CRJ-200	Regional Jetliner	Tomsk	Nizhny Novgorod	2,525 km (1,569 mi; 1,363 nmi)	3:55	UVT Aero	RT 267, RT 582
Bombardier CRJ-550	Regional Jetliner	Newark	Chattanooga	1,163 km (723 mi; 628 nmi)	2:23	United Express (Operated by SkyWest Airlines)	UA 4419
Bombardier CRJ-700	Regional Jetliner	Charlotte	Aspen	2,333 km (1,450 mi; 1,260 nmi)	4:20	American Eagle (Operated by SkyWest Airlines)	AA 6273, AA 6375
Bombardier CRJ-900	Regional Jetliner	Johannesburg–O. R. Tambo	Entebbe	2,931 km (1,821 mi; 1,583 nmi)	4:15	Uganda Airlines	UR 711, UR 713
Bombardier CRJ-1000	Regional Jetliner	Munich	Madrid	1,498 km (931 mi; 809 nmi)	2:50	Iberia Regional (Operated by Air Nostrum)	IB 8715, IB 8827
Comac C909	Regional Jetliner	Manado	Guangzhou	2,832 km (1,760 mi; 1,529 nmi)	3:52	TransNusa	8B 167
Comac C919	Narrow-body Jetliner	Shanghai–Hongqiao	Chengdu–Tianfu	1,618 km (1,005 mi; 874 nmi)	3:10	China Eastern	MU 9197
De Havilland Canada Dash 8	Regional Turboprop	Reykjavik	Ilulissat	1,386 km (861 mi; 748 nmi)	3:25	Icelandair (Operated by Flugfelag Airlines)	FI 127
Embraer ERJ-135	Regional Jetliner	Victoria Falls	Cape Town	1,900 km (1,181 mi; 1,026 nmi)	3:05	Airlink	4Z 391
Embraer ERJ-140	Regional Jetliner	Victoria Falls	Cape Town	1,900 km (1,181 mi; 1,026 nmi)	3:05	Airlink	4Z 391
Embraer ERJ-145	Regional Jetliner	White Plains	Miami–Opa Locka	1,787 km (1,110 mi; 965 nmi)	3:15	JSX	XE 500
Embraer E170	Regional Jetliner	Volgograd	Novosibirsk	2,686 km (1,669 mi; 1,450 nmi)	4:05	S7 Airlines	S7 5132
Embraer E175	Regional Jetliner	St. Louis	San Francisco	2,800 km (1,740 mi; 1,512 nmi)	4:44	United Express (Operated by SkyWest Airlines)	UA 5943, UA 5728
Embraer E190	Regional Jetliner	Saint Helena	Johannesburg–O. R. Tambo	3,685 km (2,290 mi; 1,990 nmi)	4:45	Airlink	4Z 132
Embraer E195	Regional Jetliner	Astana	Minsk	2,923 km (1,816 mi; 1,578 nmi)	4:20	Belavia	B2 776
Embraer E190-E2	Regional Jetliner	Singapore	Davao	2,486 km (1,545 mi; 1,342 nmi)	3:35	Scoot	TR 358/368
Embraer E195-E2	Regional Jetliner	Montreal	Vancouver	3,693 km (2,295 mi; 1,994 nmi)	5:47	Porter Airlines	PD 373
Fairchild Dornier 328JET	Regional Jetliner	Atlanta–Peachtree	Cincinnati–Lunken	580 km (360 mi; 313 nmi)	1:06	Ultimate Air Shuttle	P1 433
Fokker 70	Regional Jetliner	Brisbane	Adelaide	1,614 km (1,003 mi; 871 nmi)	3:10	Virgin Australia	VA 1384
Fokker 100	Regional Jetliner	The Granites	Perth	1,908 km (1,186 mi; 1,030 nmi)	3:25	Alliance Airlines	QQ 4832
Tupolev Tu-204-100	Narrow-body Jetliner	Moscow-Zhukovsky	Tel Aviv	2,628 km (1,633 mi; 1,419 nmi)	5:45	Red Wings Airlines	WZ 15/17
Tupolev Tu-214	Narrow-body Jetliner	Moscow-Zhukovsky	Tel Aviv	2,628 km (1,633 mi; 1,419 nmi)	5:45	Red Wings Airlines	WZ 15/17

=== Records ===
The table below lists the longest (by great-circle distance) regularly scheduled non-stop revenue flights ever operated by different types of aircraft. The table does not include special promotional or delivery flights, such as shown above.

Aircraft	Type	Origin	Destination	Distance	Scheduled duration	Airline	Flight number
Airbus A220-100	Narrow-body Jetliner	Washington–Dulles	Seattle/Tacoma	3,710 km (2,305 mi; 2,003 nmi)	6:20	Delta Air Lines	DL 1087
Airbus A220-300	Narrow-body Jetliner	Tampere	Tenerife–South	4,745 km (2,948 mi; 2,562 nmi)	7:00	airBaltic	BT 581
Airbus A300-600	Wide-body Jetliner	Dakar–Senghor	New York–JFK	6,125 km (3,806 mi; 3,307 nmi)	8:35	Air Afrique	RK 531/541/551/571 (Note: The flight number appears to have corresponded to each day of the week that the flight operated.)
Airbus A310	Wide-body Jetliner	Buenos Aires–Ezeiza	New York–JFK	8,500 km (5,282 mi; 4,590 nmi)	12:10	Aerolíneas Argentinas	AR 1300
Airbus A318	Narrow-body Jetliner	New York–JFK	London–City	5,569 km (3,460 mi; 3,007 nmi)	7:05	British Airways	BA 2/BA 4
Airbus A319	Narrow-body Jetliner	Khabarovsk	Yekaterinburg	4,862 km (3,021 mi; 2,625 nmi)	7:05	Ural Airlines	U6 174
Airbus A319LR	Narrow-body Jetliner	Düsseldorf	Chicago–O'Hare	6,808 km (4,230 mi; 3,676 nmi)	9:15	Lufthansa	LH 436
Airbus A320	Narrow-body Jetliner	Blagoveschensk	Moscow	5,608 km (3,485 mi; 3,028 nmi)	7:29	S7 Airlines	S7 3064
Airbus A320neo	Narrow-body Jetliner	Melbourne	Bandar Seri Begawan	5,646 km (3,508 mi; 3,049 nmi)	7:10	Royal Brunei Airlines	BI 54
Airbus A321	Narrow-body Jetliner	Tel Aviv	Reykjavik–Keflavík	5,284 km (3,283 mi; 2,853 nmi)	7:15	WOW Air	WW 699
Airbus A321neo	Narrow-body Jetliner	Reykjavik–Keflavík	Los Angeles	6,942 km (4,314 mi; 3,748 nmi)	9:35	WOW Air	WW 173
Airbus A321LR	Narrow-body Jetliner	Oakland	Terceira	7,874 km (4,893 mi; 4,252 nmi)	9:49	Azores Airlines	S4 236
Airbus A321XLR	Narrow-body Jetliner	Mumbai	Amsterdam	6,866 km (4,266 mi; 3,707 nmi)	11:05	IndiGo	6E 21
Airbus A330-200	Wide-body Jetliner	Los Angeles	Melbourne	12,778 km (7,940 mi; 6,900 nmi)	15:50	Qantas	QF 94
Airbus A330-300	Wide-body Jetliner	Vancouver	Hong Kong–Chek Lap Kok	10,287 km (6,392 mi; 5,555 nmi)	13:55	Hong Kong Airlines	HX 81
Airbus A330-800	Wide-body Jetliner	Kuwait City	New York–JFK	10,223 km (6,352 mi; 5,520 nmi)	13:25	Kuwait Airways	KU 117
Airbus A330-900	Wide-body Jetliner	Kuala Lumpur-International	Algiers	10,564 km (6,564 mi; 5,704 nmi)	14:45	Air Algérie	AH 3157
Airbus A340-200	Wide-body Jetliner	Buenos Aires–Ezeiza	Sydney	11,789 km (7,325 mi; 6,366 nmi)	15:50	Aerolíneas Argentinas	AR 1182
Airbus A340-300	Wide-body Jetliner	New York–JFK	Johannesburg–O. R. Tambo	12,824 km (7,968 mi; 6,924 nmi)	14:45	South African Airways	SA 204
Airbus A340-500	Wide-body Jetliner	Newark	Singapore–Changi	15,345 km (9,535 mi; 8,286 nmi)	18:50	Singapore Airlines	SQ 21
Airbus A340-600	Wide-body Jetliner	New York–JFK	Bangkok–Suvarnabhumi	13,963 km (8,676 mi; 7,539 nmi)	17:45	Thai Airways International	TG 790
Airbus A350-900	Wide-body Jetliner	New York–JFK	Singapore–Changi	15,349 km (9,537 mi; 8,288 nmi)	18:40	Singapore Airlines	SQ 23
Airbus A350-900ULR	Wide-body Jetliner	New York–JFK	Singapore–Changi	15,349 km (9,537 mi; 8,288 nmi)	18:40	Singapore Airlines	SQ 23
Airbus A350-1000	Wide-body Jetliner	Auckland	Doha	14,535 km (9,032 mi; 7,848 nmi)	17:15	Qatar Airways	QR 921
Airbus A380	Wide-body Jetliner	Auckland	Dubai–International	14,200 km (8,823 mi; 7,667 nmi)	17:25	Emirates	EK 449
Boeing BBJ1	Narrow-body Jetliner	Amsterdam	Houston–Intercontinental	8,067 km (5,013 mi; 4,356 nmi)	10:40	KLM	KL 663
Boeing BBJ2	Narrow-body Jetliner	Zurich	Newark	6,349 km (3,945 mi; 3,428 nmi)	8:50	Swiss	LX 18
Boeing 707-300	Narrow-body Jetliner	Buenos Aires–Ezeiza	Madrid	10,062 km (6,252 mi; 5,433 nmi)	13:00	Aerolineas Argentinas	AR 1132
Boeing 717	Narrow-body Jetliner	Kansas City	Seattle/Tacoma	2,397 km (1,489 mi; 1,294 nmi)	3:35	Midwest Airlines	YX 89
Boeing 727-100	Narrow-body Jetliner	New York–JFK	Los Angeles	3,983 km (2,475 mi; 2,151 nmi)	6:00	MGM Grand Air	MG 300
Boeing 727-200ADV	Narrow-body Jetliner	Charlotte	San Francisco	3,695 km (2,296 mi; 1,995 nmi)	5:45	Piedmont Airlines	PI 7
Boeing 737-200	Narrow-body Jetliner	Montreal	Vancouver	3,693 km (2,295 mi; 1,994 nmi)	5:40	CP Air	CP 87
Boeing 737-300	Narrow-body Jetliner	San Francisco	Newark	4,128 km (2,565 mi; 2,229 nmi)	5:14	Continental Airlines	CO 449
Boeing 737-400	Narrow-body Jetliner	Oslo	Gran Canaria	4,105 km (2,551 mi; 2,217 nmi)	5:20	SAS Scandinavian Airlines	SK 4697
Boeing 737-600	Narrow-body Jetliner	Ottawa	Vancouver	3,562 km (2,213 mi; 1,923 nmi)	5:13	WestJet	WS 143
Boeing 737-700	Narrow-body Jetliner	Cairns	Tokyo–Haneda	5,838 km (3,628 mi; 3,152 nmi)	7:45	Virgin Australia	VA 77
Boeing 737-700ER	Narrow-body Jetliner	Tokyo–Narita	Mumbai–Shivaji	6,796 km (4,223 mi; 3,670 nmi)	9:45	All Nippon Airways	NH 944
Boeing 737-800	Narrow-body Jetliner	Brasília	Orlando	6,079 km (3,777 mi; 3,282 nmi)	7:50	Gol Transportes Aéreos	G3 7602
Boeing 737-900	Narrow-body Jetliner	Miami	Seattle/Tacoma	4,384 km (2,724 mi; 2,367 nmi)	6:57	Alaska Airlines	AS 17
Boeing 737-900ER	Narrow-body Jetliner	Dar es Salaam	Istanbul	5,438 km (3,379 mi; 2,936 nmi)	7:25	Turkish Airlines	TK 604
Boeing 737 MAX 8	Narrow-body Jetliner	Melbourne	Kuala Lumpur–International	6,306 km (3,918 mi; 3,405 nmi)	8:35	Batik Air Malaysia	OD 174 / OD 176
Boeing 737 MAX 9	Narrow-body Jetliner	Reykjavik–Keflavík	Seattle/Tacoma	5,830 km (3,623 mi; 3,148 nmi)	7:50	Icelandair	FI 681
Boeing 747SP	Wide-body Jetliner	Los Angeles	Sydney	12,051 km (7,488 mi; 6,507 nmi)	15:40	Pan Am	PA 815 (Note: Service began in late 1982, and continued as PA 815 until United bought Pan Am's Pacific route network in April 1985. On 12 February 1986, the flight was renumbered to UA 815.)
Boeing 747SP	Wide-body Jetliner	Los Angeles	Sydney	12,051 km (7,488 mi; 6,507 nmi)	14:45	Qantas	QF 12
Boeing 747SP	Wide-body Jetliner	Los Angeles	Sydney	12,051 km (7,488 mi; 6,507 nmi)	14:55	United Airlines	UA 815
Boeing 747-100	Wide-body Jetliner	Minneapolis/Saint Paul	Tokyo–Narita	9,576 km (5,950 mi; 5,171 nmi)	12:40	Northwest Airlines	NW 19
Boeing 747-200	Wide-body Jetliner	New York–JFK	Tokyo–Narita	10,854 km (6,744 mi; 5,861 nmi)	13:50	Japan Airlines	JL 5
Boeing 747-200	Wide-body Jetliner	New York–JFK	Tokyo–Narita	10,854 km (6,744 mi; 5,861 nmi)	13:40	Northwest Airlines	NW 17
Boeing 747-200	Wide-body Jetliner	New York–JFK	Tokyo–Narita	10,854 km (6,744 mi; 5,861 nmi)	13:50	United Airlines	UA 801
Boeing 747-300	Wide-body Jetliner	Hong Kong–Kai Tak	San Francisco	11,127 km (6,914 mi; 6,008 nmi)	11:00	Singapore Airlines	SQ 2
Boeing 747-400	Wide-body Jetliner	Atlanta	Johannesburg–O. R. Tambo	13,581 km (8,439 mi; 7,333 nmi)	15:05	South African Airways	SA 212
Boeing 747-400D	Wide-body Jetliner	Tokyo–Haneda	Okinawa–Naha	1,554 km (966 mi; 839 nmi)	2:50	All Nippon Airways	NH 127
Boeing 747-400ER	Wide-body Jetliner	Sydney	Dallas/Fort Worth	13,804 km (8,577 mi; 7,454 nmi)	15:25	Qantas	QF 7
Boeing 747-8	Wide-body Jetliner	Atlanta	Seoul–Incheon	11,510 km (7,152 mi; 6,215 nmi)	15:40	Korean Air	KE 36
Boeing 757-200	Narrow-body Jetliner	Buenos Aires–Ezeiza	Mexico City–Benito Juárez	7,378 km (4,584 mi; 3,984 nmi)	9:50	Mexicana Airlines	MX 1690
Boeing 757-300	Narrow-body Jetliner	Reykjavik–Keflavík	Denver	5,742 km (3,568 mi; 3,100 nmi)	8:05	Icelandair	FI 671
Boeing 767-200ER	Wide-body Jetliner	Tokyo–Narita	Mexico City–Benito Juárez	11,272 km (7,004 mi; 6,086 nmi)	12:55	Aeroméxico	AM 57
Boeing 767-300ER	Wide-body Jetliner	Tokyo–Narita	Mexico City–Benito Juárez	11,272 km (7,004 mi; 6,086 nmi)	12:55	Aeroméxico	AM 57
Boeing 767-400ER	Wide-body Jetliner	Munich	Houston–Intercontinental	8,718 km (5,417 mi; 4,707 nmi)	11:30	United Airlines	UA 105
Boeing 777-200	Wide-body Jetliner	São Paulo–Guarulhos	Chicago–O'Hare	8,404 km (5,222 mi; 4,538 nmi)	10:30	United Airlines	UA 845
Boeing 777-200ER	Wide-body Jetliner	Newark	Hong Kong–Chek Lap Kok	12,980 km (8,065 mi; 7,009 nmi)	16:00	United Airlines	UA 179
Boeing 777-200ER	Wide-body Jetliner	Newark	Hong Kong–Chek Lap Kok	12,980 km (8,065 mi; 7,009 nmi)	16:00	Continental Airlines	CO 99 (Note: Service began on 1 March 2001, and continued as CO 99 until shortly before United and Continental merged in early 2012. On 15 February 2012, the flight was renumbered to UA 117, and subsequently again renumbered to UA 179 on 15 December 2014. The last flight was on 4 February 2020.)
Boeing 777-200LR	Wide-body Jetliner	Auckland	Doha	14,535 km (9,032 mi; 7,848 nmi)	17:50	Qatar Airways	QR 921
Boeing 777-300	Wide-body Jetliner	Moscow–Vnukovo	Los Angeles	9,817 km (6,100 mi; 5,301 nmi)	14:35	Transaero	UN 557
Boeing 777-300ER	Wide-body Jetliner	New York–JFK	Manila	13,712 km (8,520 mi; 7,404 nmi)	17:00	Philippine Airlines	PR 127
Boeing 787-8	Wide-body Jetliner	San Francisco	Singapore–Changi	13,593 km (8,446 mi; 7,340 nmi)	16:43	United Airlines	UA 1
Boeing 787-9	Wide-body Jetliner	Papeete	Paris–Charles de Gaulle	15,715 km (9,765 mi; 8,485 nmi)	16:20	Air Tahiti Nui	TN 64
Boeing 787-10	Wide-body Jetliner	Johannesburg–O. R. Tambo	Newark	12,858 km (7,990 mi; 6,943 nmi)	15:50	United Airlines	UA 187
Bombardier CRJ-200	Regional Jetliner	Calgary	Houston–Intercontinental	2,813 km (1,748 mi; 1,519 nmi)	3:54	Air Canada Express (Operated by Jazz Aviation)	AC 8103
Bombardier CRJ-700	Regional Jetliner	Atlanta	Tucson	2,480 km (1,541 mi; 1,339 nmi)	4:45	Delta Connection (Operated by SkyWest Airlines)	DL 1976
Bombardier CRJ-900	Regional Jetliner	Johannesburg–O. R. Tambo	Entebbe	2,931 km (1,821 mi; 1,583 nmi)	4:15	Uganda Airlines	UR 711
Comac C909	Regional Jetliner	Manado	Guangzhou	2,832 km (1,760 mi; 1,529 nmi)	3:52	TransNusa	8B 16
Comac C919	Narrow-body Jetliner	Shanghai–Hongqiao	Chengdu–Tianfu	1,618 km (1,005 mi; 874 nmi)	3:10	China Eastern	MU 9197
Consolidated PBY Catalina	Seaplane	Nedlands	Koggala	5,625 km (3,495 mi; 3,037 nmi)	27:15-32:09	Qantas	1Q / 2Q (Note: The Double Sunrise flight numbers were 1Q[*] (eastbound to Perth eastbound), and 2Q[*] (westbound to Koggala), the number after the Q was sequential and used for both directions once from 1Q1 and 2Q1 through to 1Q133)
Concorde	Narrow-body Supersonic liner	Singapore–Paya Lebar	Bahrain	6,332 km (3,935 mi; 3,419 nmi)	4:25	Singapore Airlines	SQ 17 / SQ 301
Douglas DC-8-62	Narrow-body Jetliner	Tokyo–Narita	New York–JFK	10,854 km (6,744 mi; 5,861 nmi)	12:30	Japan Airlines	JL 2 (Note: The return flight JL 1 had a refueling stop in San Francisco.)
Douglas DC-9-50	Narrow-body Jetliner	Helsinki	Madrid	2,950 km (1,833 mi; 1,593 nmi)	4:25	Finnair	AY 883
Embraer ERJ-145	Regional Jetliner	Acapulco	Los Angeles	2,665 km (1,656 mi; 1,439 nmi)	4:05	Delta Connection (Operated by ExpressJet Airlines)	DL 7728
Embraer E170	Regional Jetliner	Volgograd	Novosibirsk	2,686 km (1,669 mi; 1,450 nmi)	4:05	S7 Airlines	S7 5132
Embraer E175	Regional Jetliner	Washington–Dulles	Bozeman	2,854 km (1,773 mi; 1,541 nmi)	4:46	United Express (Operated by Mesa Airlines)	UA 6225
Embraer E190	Regional Jetliner	Lagos	Nairobi–Jomo Kenyatta	3,835 km (2,383 mi; 2,071 nmi)	5:20	Kenya Airways	KQ 533/535
Embraer E195	Regional Jetliner	Minsk	Astana	2,923 km (1,816 mi; 1,578 nmi)	4:00	Belavia	B2 775
Embraer E190-E2	Regional Jetliner	Bergen	Larnaca	3,486 km (2,166 mi; 1,882 nmi)	4:23	Widerøe	WF 7700
Embraer E195-E2	Regional Jetliner	Lagos	Johannesburg–O. R. Tambo	4,511 km (2,803 mi; 2,436 nmi)	6:15	Air Peace	P4 7563
Fokker 70	Regional Jetliner	Brisbane	The Granites	2,434 km (1,512 mi; 1,314 nmi)	4:10	Alliance Airlines	QQ 4821/4823
Fokker 100	Regional Jetliner	Brisbane	The Granites	2,434 km (1,512 mi; 1,314 nmi)	4:10	Alliance Airlines	QQ 4821/4823
Lockheed Constellation L-1649A	Propliner	San Francisco	Paris–Orly	9,001 km (5,593 mi; 4,860 nmi)	19:45	Trans World Airlines	TW 850
Lockheed L-1011-500	Wide-body Jetliner	Frankfurt	Los Angeles	9,344 km (5,806 mi; 5,045 nmi)	11:55	Delta Air Lines	DL 57
McDonnell Douglas DC-10-30ER	Wide-body Jetliner	Seattle/Tacoma	Hong Kong–Kai Tak	10,443 km (6,489 mi; 5,639 nmi)	14:25	United Airlines	UA 17
McDonnell Douglas MD-11	Wide-body Jetliner	Los Angeles	Hong Kong–Kai Tak	11,663 km (7,247 mi; 6,298 nmi)	15:25	Delta Air Lines	DL 89
McDonnell Douglas MD-83	Narrow-body Jetliner	Malabo	Madrid	4,252 km (2,642 mi; 2,296 nmi)	5:50	Ecuato Guineana (Operated by Spanair)	JK 132
Tupolev Tu-114D	Propliner	Havana	Moscow–Sheremetyevo	9,594 km (5,961 mi; 5,180 nmi)	16:25	Aeroflot	SU 047
Tupolev Tu-204-300	Narrow-body Jetliner	Vladivostok	Moscow–Vnukovo	6,452 km (4,009 mi; 3,484 nmi)	8:50	Vladivostok Air	XF 459

== Other record flights (non-scheduled) ==
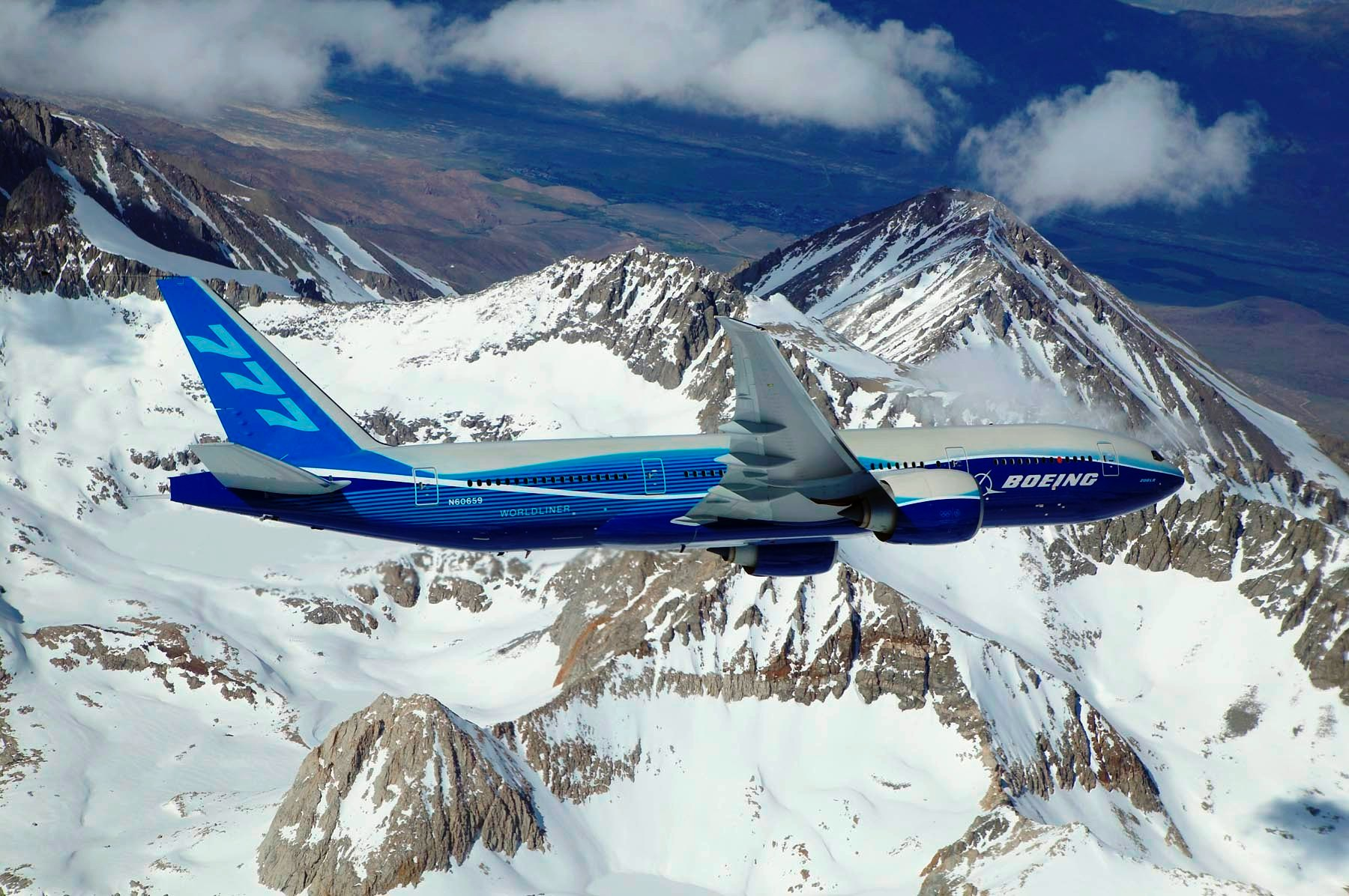
Boeing 777-200LR (N6066Z) flew a demonstration flight from Hong Kong to London non-stop in 2005 in an unusual east-bound route, setting a new world record at the time for a commercial airliner at 21,602 kilometers covered in 22 hours 42 minutes.

=== Promotional and delivery flights ===
A number of promotional or delivery flights have extended the record of longest non-stop flights by a commercial aircraft:

- March 23, 1976: South African Airways' delivery flight of their first Boeing 747SP set a new record for nonstop flight by commercial aircraft. Flying 16,560 kilometres (10,290 mi; 8,942 nmi), covering a great circle distance of 16,429 kilometres (10,209 mi; 8,871 nmi), from Paine Field (near Seattle) to Cape Town, South Africa in 17 hours and 22 minutes.
- August 16, 1989: The first Qantas Boeing 747-400, VH-OJA, the City of Canberra, set a non-stop distance record for a commercial aircraft by flying 17,039 kilometres (10,588 mi; 9,200 nmi), covering a great circle distance of 17,016 kilometres (10,573 mi; 9,188 nmi) between London and Sydney in 20 hours, 9 minutes. The purpose was to publicize the airline's "Longreach" services with the 747-400.
- June 16, 1993: An Airbus A340-200, F-WWBA, dubbed The World Ranger, set two new records as it flew an around the world route. First flying 19,089 kilometres (11,861 mi; 10,307 nmi) from Paris-Le Bourget Airport to Auckland in 21 hours and 32 minutes. After a 5 hour layover, the flight continued east-bound on a slightly longer route back to Paris-Le Bourget flying 19,246 kilometres (11,959 mi; 10,392 nmi), covering a great circle distance of 18,541 kilometres (11,521 mi; 10,011 nmi) in 21 hours and 46 minutes. This was the first non-stop flight between Europe and New Zealand.
- March 31, 1997: A Boeing 777-200ER, "The Super Ranger", flew 20,045 kilometres (12,455 mi; 10,823 nmi) eastward from Seattle's Boeing Field to Kuala Lumpur, prior to refueling and completing its around the world flight back to Seattle.
- November 9, 2005: A Boeing 777-200LR demonstrator aircraft "Baby Blue 2" flew a great circle distance of 21,602 kilometres (13,423 mi; 11,664 nmi), eastward from Hong Kong to London–Heathrow in 22 hours, 42 minutes as opposed to a normal westward routing for that sector, which is much shorter at 9,648 kilometres (5,995 mi; 5,210 nmi). Eight pilots and twenty-seven passengers were on board.
- July 23, 2026: Airbus conducted two non-stop test flights using an A350-1000ULR destined for future launch customer Qantas, departing from Toulouse to Melbourne and back on an eastward circumglobal routing. The first leg departed Toulouse and flew a distance of approximately 17,664 kilometres (10,976 mi; 9,538 nmi) in 19 hours and 13 minutes. On July 27, the record-setting return leg departed Melbourne on a transpacific route, flying a record distance of 23,155 kilometres (14,388 mi; 12,503 nmi) in 24 hours and 24 minutes. This was significantly farther than the great circle distance of 16,889 kilometres (10,494 mi; 9,119 nmi) between the two airports.

=== Non-scheduled commercial flights ===
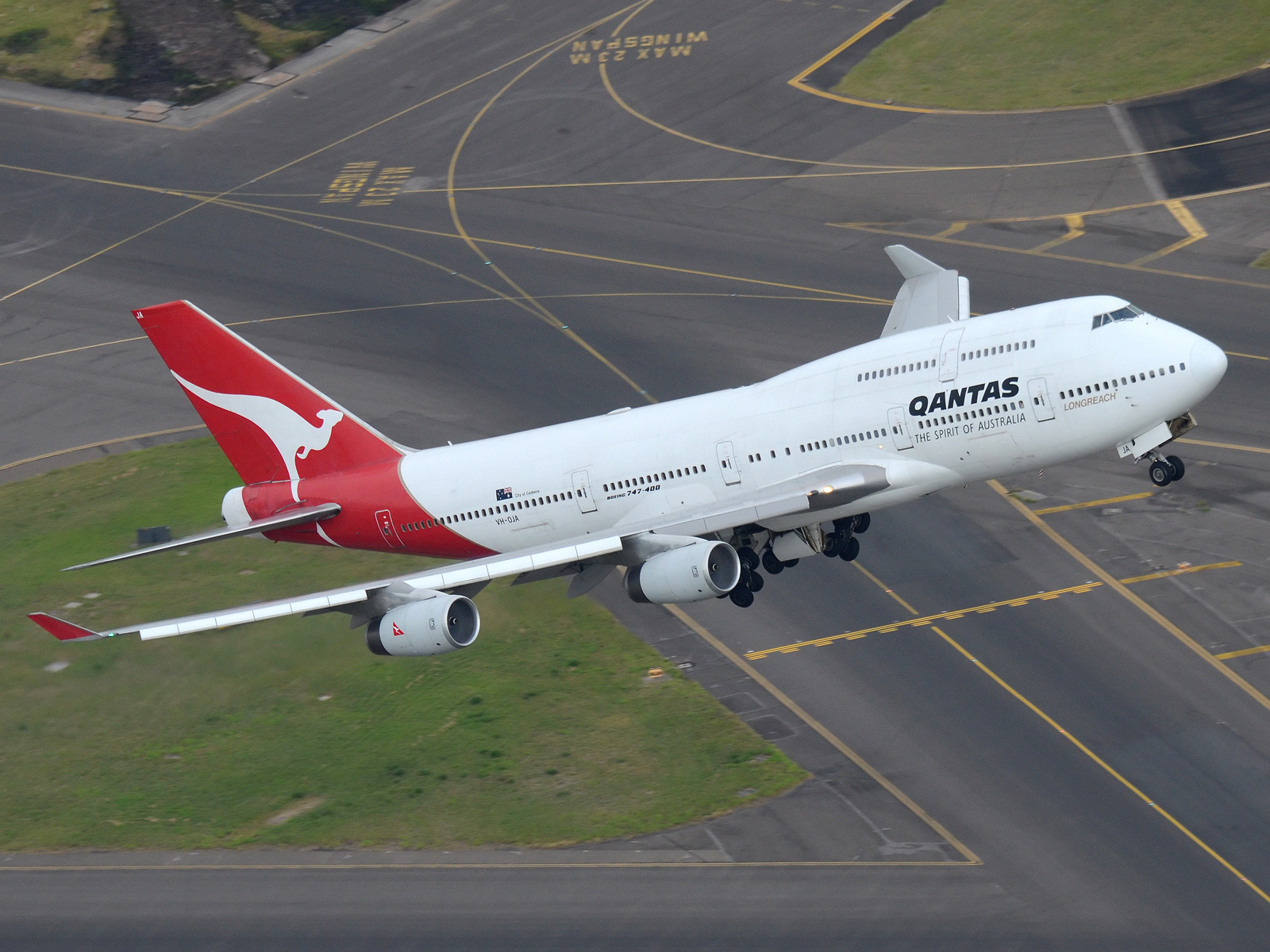
Qantas 747-400 City of Canberra (VH-OJA) flew from London to Sydney non-stop during its 1989 promotional flight, flying 17,000 kilometers in about 20 hours.

- March 25, 2006: British Airways used a Boeing 777-200ER to fly the longest commercial non-stop flight with paying passengers, when chartered by UK Prime Minister Tony Blair and his entourage of staff and journalists to fly from meetings in Brussels, traveling non-stop to ensure their attendance at the closing ceremonies of the 2006 Commonwealth Games in Melbourne. The flight, covering 17,157 kilometres (10,661 mi; 9,264 nmi) and lasting 18 hours, 45 minutes, included a BA staff of 20 to facilitate cockpit and cabin crew rotation during the flight.
- March 28, 2021: A Comlux Boeing 787-8, registered P4-787, set a new record for the longest commercial non-stop flight with paying passengers. It flew a non-scheduled (chartered), non-stop flight between the nearly antipodal points of Seoul–Incheon and Buenos Aires. The flight departed at 12:47 local time on 28 March and arrived on the same day at 21:26 local time, having covered a total of 19,483 kilometres (12,106 mi; 10,520 nmi) in 20 hours 19 minutes.
- August 4, 2026: A National Airlines Boeing 777-F, registered N792CA, operated a service between Glasgow Prestwick and Melbourne, on behalf of UK-based firm Golden Aviation. The aircraft travelled 18,090 kilometres, with a flight time totalling 19 hours and 24 minutes. The flight holds the record for the longest commercial cargo service ever operated by a Boeing 777-F.

== Future routes ==
=== Scheduled services ===
The below new, and scheduled to be launched, flights have been announced:

==== Direct flights ====
With a total distance between origin and destination exceeding 12,280 kilometres (7,630 mi; 6,631 nmi), these will be placed on the top 30 list:

Origin	Stop	Destination	Airline	Flight number	Distance Origin – Destination	Distance All sectors	Scheduled duration	Aircraft	First flight
Melbourne	Bangkok-Suvarnabhumi	Helsinki	Finnair	AY 146	15,172 km (9,427 mi; 8,192 nmi)	15,227 km (9,462 mi; 8,222 nmi)	23:30	Airbus A350-900	25 October 2026
Melbourne	Perth	London–Heathrow	Qantas	QF 9	16,904 km (10,504 mi; 9,127 nmi)	17,205 km (10,691 mi; 9,290 nmi)	21:45	Boeing 787-9	25 October 2026 (Note: Service resumption of Melbourne–Perth sector)
Melbourne	Kuala Lumpur	London–Heathrow	British Airways	BA 34	16,904 km (10,504 mi; 9,127 nmi)	16,916 km (10,511 mi; 9,134 nmi)	22:05	Boeing 787-9	9 January 2027 (Note: British Airways previously flew Melbourne to London-Heathrow via Singapore until 2006)
Addis Ababa	Dublin	Atlanta	Ethiopian Airlines	ET 518	12,397 km (7,703 mi; 6,694 nmi)	12,697 km (7,890 mi; 6,856 nmi)	17:10	Boeing 787-8	28 March 2027 (Note: Replacing current Addis Ababa-Rome-Atlanta routing.)

=== Envisioned services ===
- According to a report published in September 2015, Miami International Airport was in talks with EVA Air and China Airlines of Taiwan to launch before 2018 a non-stop 13,922 km (8,651 mi; 7,517 nmi) flight to Taipei. In June 2016, a chartered China Airlines Boeing 777-300ER carrying Taiwan President Tsai Ing-wen flew non-stop from Taipei to Miami before continuing to Panama. The airport director spoke with President Tsai about the opportunity for scheduled service between Miami and Taipei. The airport has been actively pursuing a non-stop flight to East Asia since 2015. There were no non-stop passenger flights between Florida, the third most populous U.S. state, and East Asia, until February 2026 between Orlando and Tokyo Narita. In May 2017, the region's aviation department director predicted such a flight would happen within the next 24 months. In November 2020, Starlux Airlines applied for rights to operate this Taipei – Miami route along with 14 others. In 2023, Starlux announced they intend to launch one new US destination per year to connect to the "Western, Midwest, and Eastern" US.
- On 25 August 2017, Qantas announced "Project Sunrise" aiming to launch new ultra-long-haul non-stop "Kangaroo Routes" from Australia to major destinations including London, New York, and Paris. On 20 October 2019, Qantas demonstrated the New York-JFK to Sydney flight using a Boeing 787-9. The flight took 19 hours, 15 minutes; the 49 people on the plane were staff and selected guests. To enable the flight, the weight had to be precisely trimmed by limiting the number of passengers and cargo weight. A month later, departing on 14 November 2019 and landing on 15 November, Qantas demonstrated another "Project Sunrise" route, flying a 787-9 from London–Heathrow to Sydney Airport non-stop with 52 passengers. The flight lasted 19 hours, 19 minutes and traveled 17,750 kilometres (11,029 mi; 9,584 nmi). In December 2019, Qantas announced they had selected an Airbus A350-1000 (with some potential modifications) for Project Sunrise if the flights proceed. The Airbus A350-1000 went into service in February 2018 with a range of 16,100 kilometres (10,004 mi; 8,693 nmi) and is capable of flying non-stop both Sydney – London and Sydney – New York City. In June 2026, after a five-year delay due to COVID-19, Qantas announced it planned to start nonstop service between London and Sydney in October 2027; ticket sales start in February. Nonstop service between New York-JFK and Sydney is set to follow after. These Project Sunrise flights will use an Airbus A350-1000ULR, a modified A350-1000 with an extra fuel tank. Qantas has ordered 12 of these planes. These flights will be the world's longest nonstop flights.
- In November 2019, El Al announced it was exploring a new non-stop Tel Aviv – Melbourne route with 3 initial scheduled roundtrip "test" flights, covering 13,736 km (8,535 mi; 7,417 nmi). Tickets went on sale in December 2019, but due to COVID-19's impact on international flights, only the first of the three flights was operated on 2 April 2020. The route covered 14,760 km (9,171 mi; 7,970 nmi): 1000 km longer than the great-circle route, as flights to and from Israel were not allowed to traverse Saudi or Omani airspace. In July 2022, Saudi Arabia opened its airspace to all Israeli carriers for the first time and in February 2023 Oman opened its airspace to all "qualified commercial carriers"; bringing a great-circle flight, closer to viability. In March 2023, El Al signed a LOI and announced they are (re)launching this route "by June 2024" with thrice weekly service using Boeing 787's.
- In May 2021, Vietnam Airlines received government approval to fly A350-900's and 787-9's on multiple non-stop North American routes including Ho Chi Minh City to New York–JFK, 14,307 km (8,890 mi; 7,725 nmi); and Ho Chi Minh City to Dallas, 14,557 km (9,045 mi; 7,860 nmi). In November 2021, Vietnam Airlines launched the first of such transpacific flights flying between Ho Chi Minh City and San Francisco, using the A350-900 with flight numbers VN98/99.
- In September 2023, in their updated marketing materials, Turkish Airlines announced future routes they are working to develop. Amongst the new ones was Istanbul to Santiago: 13,094 km (8,136 mi; 7,070 nmi). This route was mentioned again by the Turkish Airlines chairman in March 2024 of envisioned launching in 2026 once their A350-1000 aircraft started to be delivered. A version of the route with a stopover in São Paulo began in late 2024; the airline's first plane landed at Santiago's Comodoro Arturo Merino Benítez International Airport on 18 December.
- In October 2024, Air India received approval from India's DGCA for flights from Delhi to Dallas; the flight, AI 109, would cover 13,173 km (8,185 mi; 7,113 nmi) if/when it happens.
- In December 2024, it was reported that Turkish Airlines, which currently operates direct flights from Istanbul to Melbourne via Singapore and to Sydney via Kuala Lumpur, would start non-stop flights from Istanbul to Melbourne, a distance of 14,634 km (9,093 mi; 7,902 nmi), and from Istanbul to Sydney, a distance of 14,968 km (9,301 mi; 8,082 nmi), in 2026, upon delivery of Airbus A350-1000 jets.
- In January 2025, Turkish Airlines announced their intention to start direct flights from Istanbul to Auckland via Singapore in 2025. In April 2025, it was reported that non-stop flights from Istanbul to Auckland, a distance of 17,069 km (10,606 mi; 9,217 nmi), were also considered.

=== Services that never began ===
- In August 2015, Emirates announced that non-stop flights between Dubai and Panama City would begin on 1 February 2016, covering 13,821 km (8,588 mi; 7,463 nmi) in 17 hours, 35 minutes westbound. In January 2016, the start was postponed to 31 March 2016. In early March 2016, Emirates postponed the route until the end of 2016 or early 2017 or "as soon as conditions allow." As of 2026, Emirates' latest public update on this route was in April 2018 when Emirates' CCO said, "We are still looking at Panama. We had some conversations recently with a delegation from Panama". In 2015, it would have been the world's longest non-stop flight.
- In July 2019, Qantas announced and began selling tickets for new non-stop flights between Brisbane and Chicago that would begin operation in April 2020 covering 14,325 km (8,901 mi; 7,735 nmi) in 16 hours, 20 minutes eastbound using a Boeing 787-9. (Flight number QF 85 and 86 in reference to the Chicago Bears 1986 Super Bowl Championship team). However, in March 2020, due to COVID-19 Qantas announced it was delaying the route's launch to September 2020. In July 2020, as part of Australia's pandemic response, almost all international flights were canceled until March 2021, including this new route. In January 2021, Qantas reopened its international flights for booking for 2021 and this new route was no longer included in their schedules for the foreseeable future/the rest of 2021. It would have been the world's fourth longest non-stop flight. In early 2023, the topic was surfaced again by Qantas, but as of 2026, still no firm plans have been announced for the envisioning of launching this route.
- In February 2020, American Airlines announced flight AA180/181 between Seattle–Tacoma and Bengaluru: 13,000 km (8,078 mi; 7,019 nmi). Though originally planned for October 2020, the launch was delayed repeatedly amid the COVID-19 pandemic and as of 2026 has not launched.

== See also ==
- Aircraft records
- Flight length
- ETOPS
- Flight distance record
- Flight endurance record
- World's longest domestic flight
- Westray to Papa Westray flight, the shortest commercial flight in the world
