= Non-stop flight =

Continuous aircraft movement off the ground between origin and destination

A non-stop flight is a flight by an aircraft with no intermediate stops, as opposed to a direct flight, which is any flight with no change in flight number, but which may include one or more stops.

== History ==
During the early age of aviation industry when aircraft range was limited, most flights were served in the form of a milk run, meaning there were many stops along the route. But as aviation technology developed and aircraft capability improved, non-stop flights began to take over and have now become a dominant form of flight in the modern times.

The dissolution of the Soviet Union in 1991 eventually opened up Russian airspace, allowing commercial airlines to exploit new circumpolar routes and enabling many new non-stop services, removing the need of making stopover in-between.

In the late 2000s to early 2010s, rising fuel prices coupled with the 2008 financial crisis resulted in cancellation of many ultra-long haul non-stop flights. As fuel prices fell and aircraft became more economical the economic viability of ultra long haul flights improved.

== Compare ==
An illustration of a San Francisco-Singapore "non-stop" flight (green) versus a "direct" flight (purple)

Direct flights and non-stop flights are often confused with each other. Starting 31 March 2019, American Airlines started offering non-stop flights from Phoenix, Arizona to London, England, meaning that the plane leaves Phoenix Sky Harbor International Airport and lands at Heathrow Airport. Conversely, a direct flight simply means that passengers typically would not get off the plane if it stops (lands) at a location between the two cities.

== See also ==
- Domestic flight
- Flight duration
- Flight length
- Longest flights
- ETOPS/LROPS
- International flight
- Mainline
- World's busiest passenger air routes
