= Singapore Airlines Flights 23 and 24 =

Longest regularly scheduled nonstop flights in the world

Singapore Airlines Flight 23
- One of Singapore's 7 A350-900ULR operating at JFK as Flight 23.
- Operator: Singapore Airlines
- Distance travelled: 16,500 km (SQ23); 17,250 km (SQ24)

Aircraft properties
- Aircraft: Airbus A350-900ULR
- Passengers: 67 (business class); 94 (premium economy); 161 (total)

Flight timeline
- Takeoff site: SQ23: New York–JFK; SQ24: Singapore Changi
- Landing site: SQ23: Singapore Changi; SQ24: New York–JFK

Singapore Airlines Flights 23 and 24 (SQ23/SIA23 and SQ24/SIA24, respectively) are the longest regularly scheduled non-stop flights in the world, operated by Singapore Airlines between Singapore Changi Airport and New York–JFK. The route launched on 9 November 2020.

The route has a great circle distance of 15,349 kilometres (9,537 mi; 8,288 nmi). However, SQ24 to New York is typically flown a ground distance of around 17,250 km (10,720 mi; 9,310 nmi) over the Pacific Ocean where jet stream winds can assist; while SQ23 back to Singapore sometimes opts, instead of the westward polar route, to fly a ground distance of 16,500 km (10,300 mi; 8,900 nmi) eastward, across the Atlantic Ocean, when favorable jet stream winds assist to save both flying time and fuel. The flights are scheduled to take over 19 hours and 18 hours respectively.

The flights originally used an Airbus A350-900. On January 16, 2021, the route was changed to operate using an Airbus A350-900ULR. The flight offers 67 business class seats and 94 premium economy seats.

== See also ==
- Singapore Airlines Flights 21 and 22 – one of the longest passenger flights in the world
- Longest flights
- Westray to Papa Westray flight – shortest scheduled passenger flight in the world
