= Aviation in Australia =

Total monthly arrivals to Australia since 1976

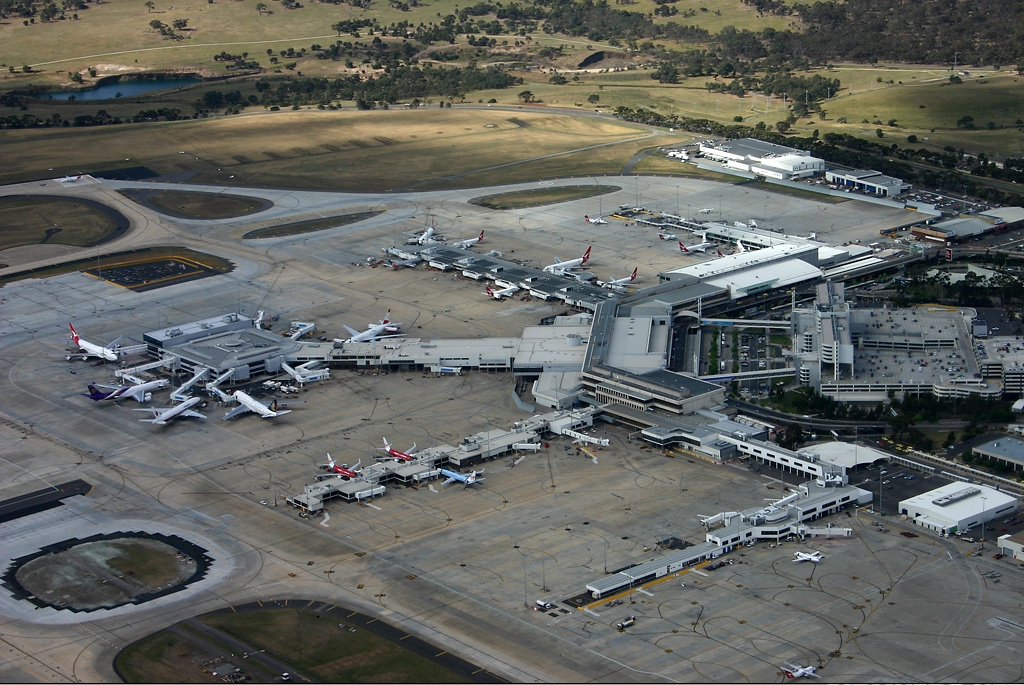
Melbourne Airport

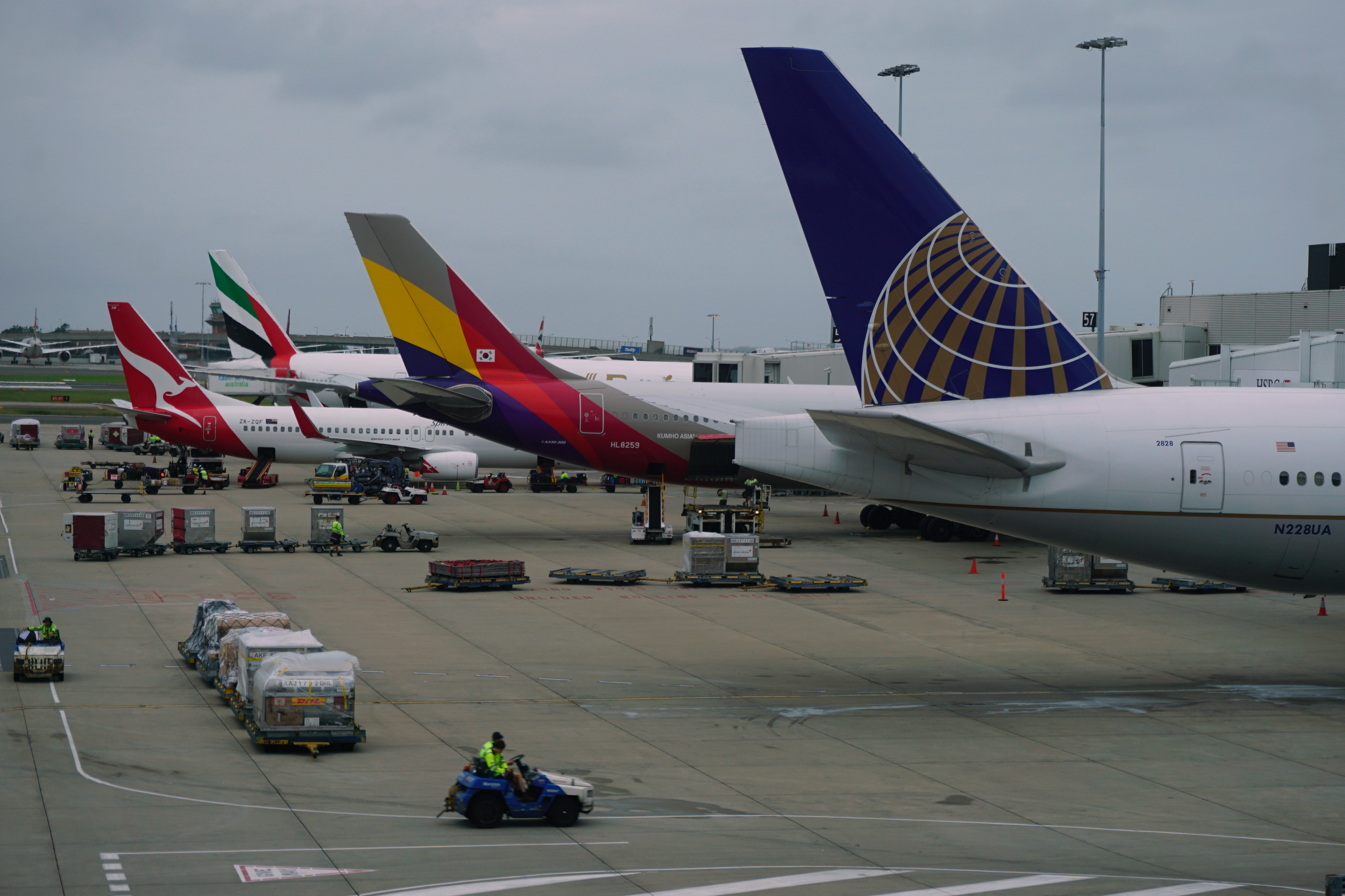
Sydney Airport

Aviation in Australia began in 1920 with the formation of Qantas, which became the flag carrier of Australia. The Australian National Airways (ANA) was the predominant domestic carrier from the mid-1930s to the early 1950s. After World War II, Qantas was nationalised and its domestic operations were transferred to Trans Australia Airlines (TAA) in 1946. The Two Airlines Policy was formally established in 1952 to ensure the viability of both airlines. However, ANA's leadership was quickly eroded by TAA, and it was acquired by Ansett Transport Industries in 1957. The duopoly continued for the next four decades. In the mid-1990s TAA was merged with Qantas and later privatised. Ansett collapsed in September 2001. In the following years, Virgin Australia became a challenger to Qantas. Both companies launched low-cost subsidiaries Jetstar and Tigerair Australia, respectively. The domestic market has remained highly concentrated, with the Qantas and Virgin Australia groups carrying almost all domestic passengers.

Overseas flights from Australia to United Kingdom via the Eastern Hemisphere are known as the Kangaroo Route, whereas flights via the Western Hemisphere are known as the Southern Cross Route. Qantas began international passenger flights in May 1935. In 1948, the first commercial flight from Australia to Africa was flown by Qantas, launching what is known as the Wallaby Route. In 1954, the first flight from Australia to North America was completed, as a 60-passenger Qantas aircraft connected Sydney with San Francisco and Vancouver, having fuel stops at Fiji, Canton Island and Hawaii. In 1982, a Pan Am airplane first flew non-stop from Los Angeles to Sydney. A non-stop flight between Australia and Europe was first completed in March 2018 from Perth to London.

== History ==
=== Until World War II ===
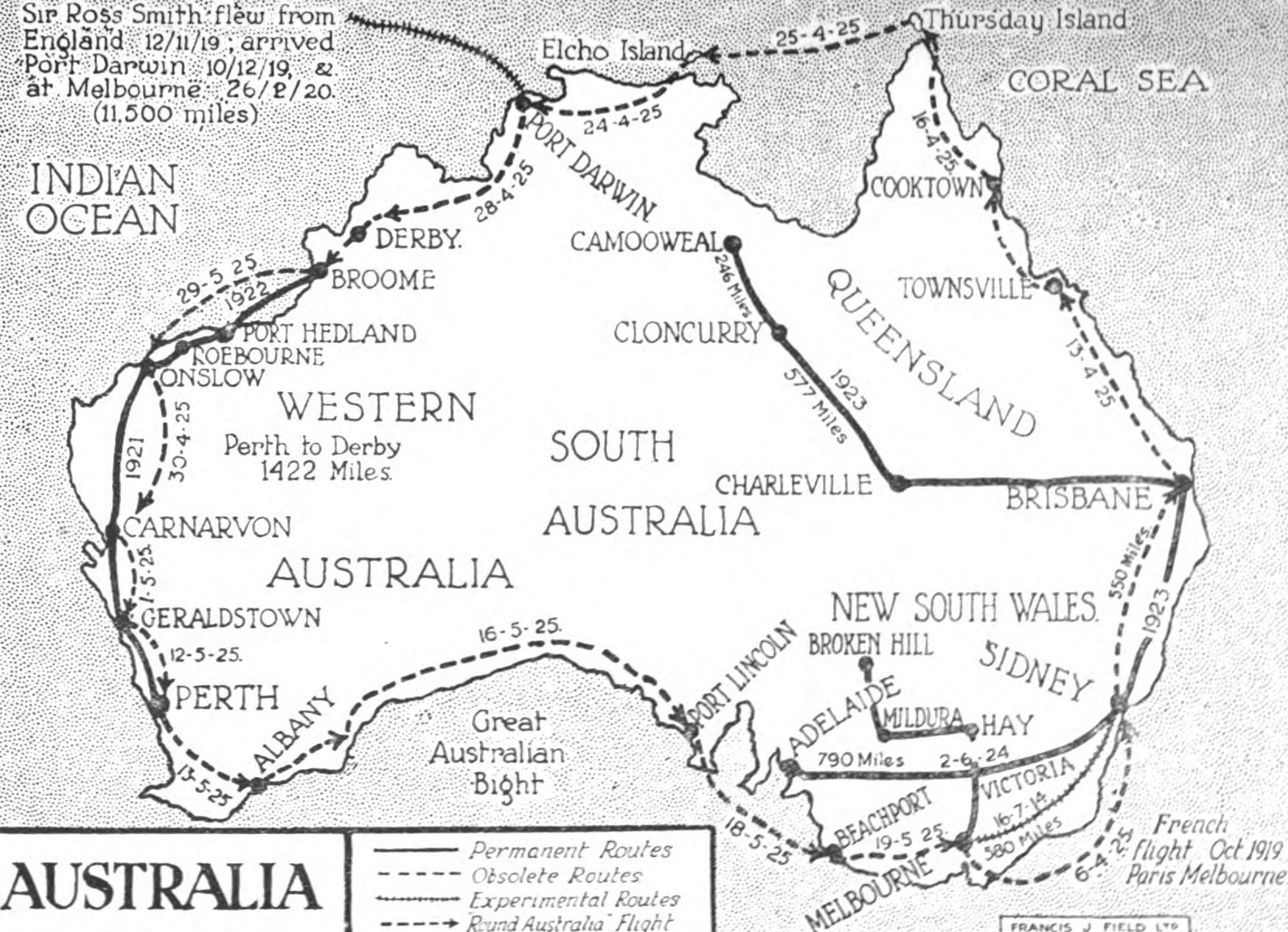
Air routes of Australia in 1925

In 1934, Qantas and Britain's Imperial Airways (a forerunner of British Airways) formed a new company, Qantas Empire Airways Limited (QEA), which commenced operations in December 1934, flying between Brisbane and Darwin. QEA flew internationally from May 1935, when the service from Darwin was extended to Singapore, and Imperial Airways operated the rest of the service through to London. Australian National Airways (ANA) was established in 1936 by a consortium of British-financed Australian shipowners.

Until World War II, Australia had been one of the world's leading centres of aviation. With its tiny population of about seven million, Australia ranked sixth in the world for scheduled air mileage, had 16 airlines, was growing at twice the world average, and had produced a number of prominent aviation pioneers, including Lawrence Hargrave, Harry Hawker, Bert Hinkler, Lawrence Wackett, the Reverend John Flynn, Sidney Cotton, Keith Virtue and Charles Kingsford Smith. Governments on both sides of politics, well aware of the immense stretches of uninhabitable desert that separated the small productive regions of Australia, regarded air transport as a matter of national importance. In the words of Arthur Brownlow Corbett, Director General of Civil Aviation:

A nation which refuses to use flying in its national life must necessarily today be a backward and defenceless nation.

Air transport was encouraged both with direct subsidies and with mail contracts. Immediately before the start of the war, more than half of all airline passenger and freight miles were subsidised.

However, after 1939 and especially after Japan's invasion of the islands to the north in 1941, civil aviation was sacrificed to military needs. During the war, most of the Qantas fleet of ten was taken over by the Australian government for war service and enemy action and accidents destroyed half of the fleet.

=== Post-World War II ===
By the end of the Second World War, there were only nine domestic airlines remaining, eight smaller regional concerns and Australian National Airways (ANA), a conglomerate owned by British and Australian shipping interests which had a virtual monopoly on the major trunk routes and received 85% of all government air transport subsidies.

The Chifley Government's view was summed up by Minister for Air, Arthur Drakeford: "Where are the great pioneers of aviation? ..... We discover that one by one the small pioneer enterprises are disappearing from the register. It is the inevitable process of absorption by a monopoly." Air transport, the government believed, was primarily a public service, like hospitals, the railways or the post office. If there was to be a monopoly at all, then it should be one owned by the public and working in the public interest.

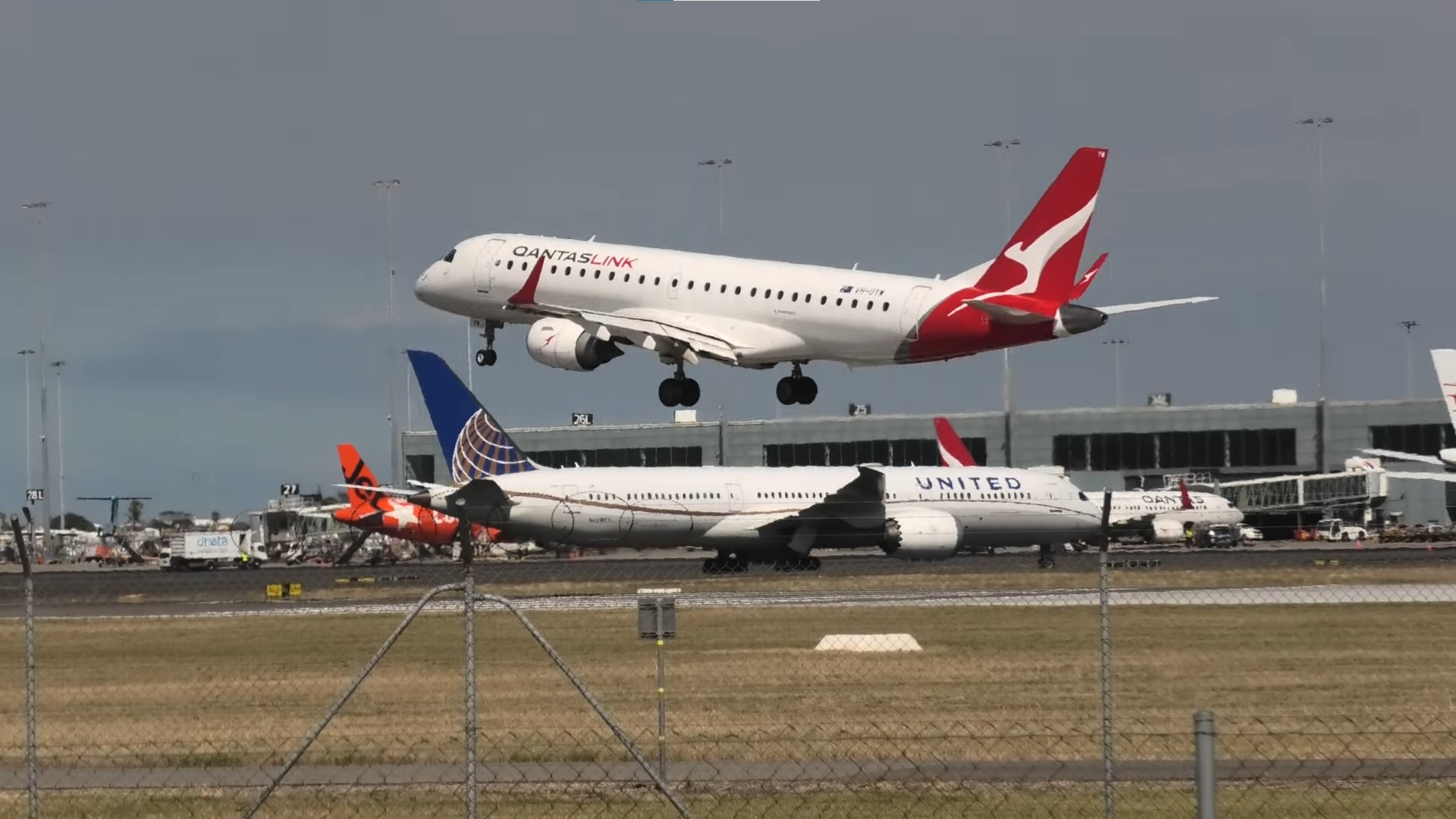
QantasLink Embraer E190 landing at Adelaide Airport, United Airlines Boeing 787-9 taxiing in background.

In August 1945, only two days after the end of World War II, the Australian parliament passed the Australian National Airways Bill, which set up the Australian National Airways Commission (ANAC) and charged it with the task of reconstructing the nation's air transport industry. In keeping with the Labor government's socialist leanings, the bill declared that licences of private operators would lapse for those routes that were adequately serviced by the national carrier. From this time on, it seemed, air transport in Australia would be a government monopoly. However, a legal challenge (Australian National Airways Pty Ltd v Commonwealth), backed by the Liberal opposition and business interests generally, was successful and in December 1945, the High Court ruled that the Commonwealth did not have the power to prevent the issue of airline licences to private companies. The government could set up an airline if it wished, but it could not legislate a monopoly. Much of the press objected strongly to the setting up of a public airline network, seeing it as a form of socialisation by stealth.

The bill was suitably amended to remove the monopoly provisions, and ANAC came into existence in February 1946. ANAC formed Trans Australia Airlines (TAA) in 1946, and nationalised Qantas in 1947. Qantas's domestic operations, in Queensland, were transferred to TAA, while Qantas continued as an international airline. Shortly later, QEA began its first services outside the British Empire, to Tokyo, and services to Hong Kong began around the same time.

=== Two Airlines Policy (1950s–1990) ===
However, ANA's leadership in Australia's aviation was quickly being eroded by TAA, so in 1952, the Menzies Government formally established the "Two Airlines Policy", to ensure the viability of both major airlines, the government-owned TAA and the privately owned ANA. In reality, it ensured the survival of the private airline ANA.

Under the policy, only two airlines were allowed to operate flights between state capital cities and major regional city airports. The Two Airlines Policy was in fact a legal barrier to new entrants to the Australian aviation market. It restricted intercapital services to the two major domestic carriers. This anti-competitive arrangement ensured that they carried approximately the same number of passengers, charged the same fares and had similar fleet sizes and equipment.

Ivan Holyman, managing director of ANA and its main driving force, died in 1957. The five British shipping companies that owned the airline had been trying to get out for several years, and offered to sell out to the government, in order that ANA merge with TAA and some smaller airlines. The government declined. Later that year, ANA was acquired by the much smaller Ansett Airways, and the duopoly would continue for the next four decades.

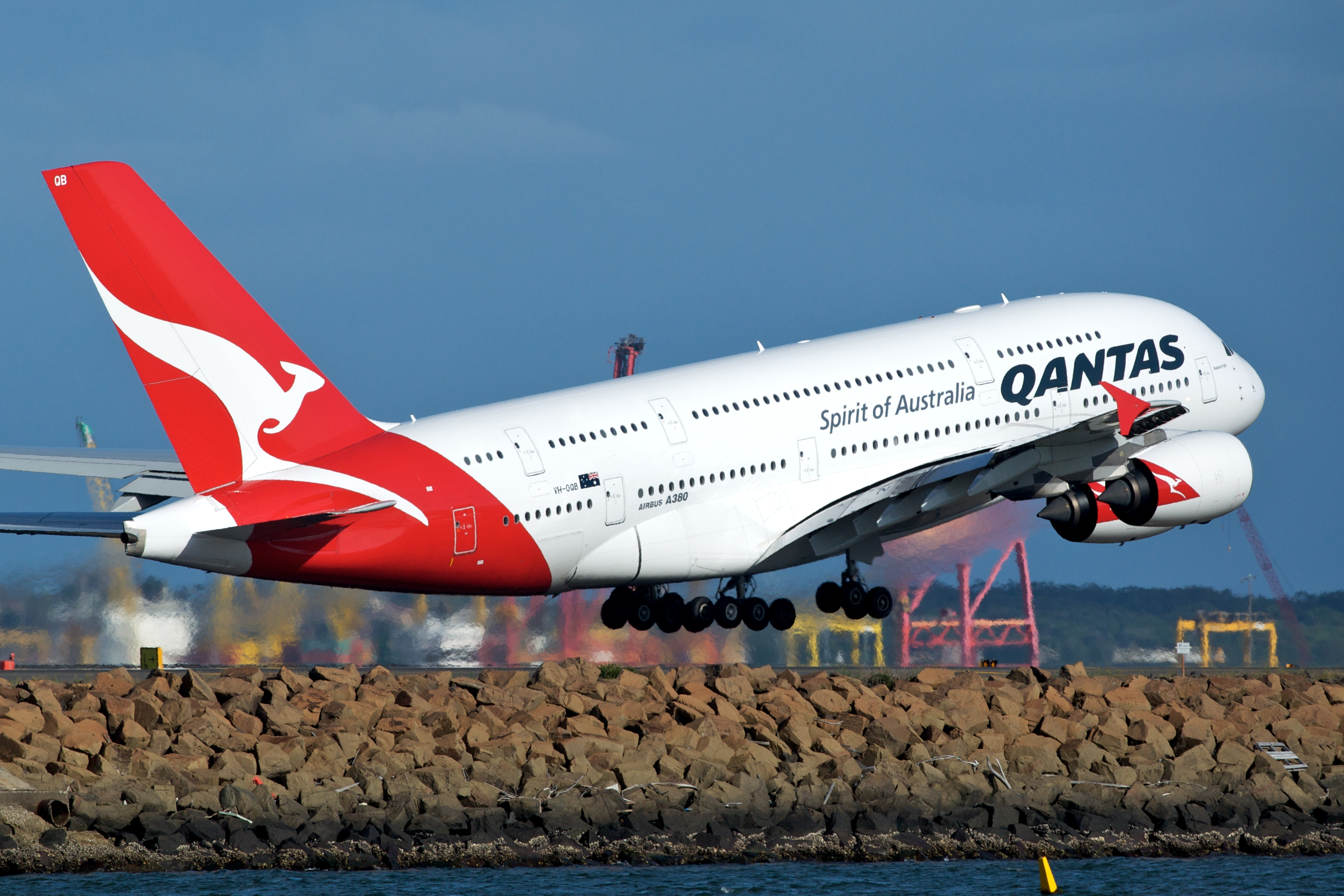
Qantas Airbus A380 taking off at Sydney Airport.

=== Deregulation ===
Deregulation of aviation in Australia commenced in the late 1980s.

In 1986 Trans-Australia Airlines was renamed Australian Airlines, which merged in September 1992 with Qantas. Qantas was gradually privatised between 1993 and 1997. The legislation allowing privatisation requires Qantas to be at least 51% owned by Australian shareholders.

In 1988, the Australian Government formed the Federal Airports Corporation (FAC), placing 22 airports around the nation under its operational control. In April 1994, the Government announced that all airports operated by FAC would be privatised in several phases.

Virgin Australia was launched as Virgin Blue in August 2000. The timing of Virgin Blue's entry into the Australian market was fortuitous as it was able to fill the vacuum created by the collapse of Ansett Australia in September 2001. In the following years, Virgin Australia became a challenger to Qantas. Both companies launched low-cost subsidiaries: Qantas formed Jetstar in 2003 and Virgin acquired Tigerair Australia in 2013.

In January 2023 a new low-cost airline Bonza began operations. Based on the Sunshine Coast Bonza focused on secondary airports avoiding competition on more established routes. The airline's operations were short-lived. In July 2024 Bonza went into liquidation after administrators failed to find a buyer.

== Market structure and regulation ==
=== Domestic competition ===
Australia's domestic airline industry has remained highly concentrated since deregulation. In June 2020 the Treasurer directed the Australian Competition and Consumer Commission (ACCC) to monitor prices, costs and profits in domestic air passenger transport and to report quarterly. In the twelfth and final report under that direction, published on 5 June 2023, the ACCC concluded that a lack of effective competition, which it said had characterised the industry for decades, had resulted in higher airfares and poorer service for consumers. It reported that more than 90% of domestic passengers had flown with the Qantas Group or Virgin Australia over the previous two decades, and that the two groups carried 94% of domestic passengers in April 2023. ACCC chair Gina Cass-Gottlieb described domestic aviation as "one of the most concentrated industries in Australia, barring only natural monopolies such as electricity grids and rail networks". The report recommended reforming the allocation of take-off and landing slots at Sydney Airport and establishing an independent ombuds scheme able to make binding decisions. Service reliability had also weakened as demand recovered after the pandemic: in April 2023 the industry cancelled 3.9% of domestic flights against a long-term average of 2.1%, and almost a third of flights arrived more than 15 minutes late against a long-term average of 18.5%.

Monitoring recommenced under a further direction on 6 November 2023. Competition narrowed in 2024 when the low-cost carrier Bonza collapsed in April and Regional Express (Rex) entered voluntary administration in July, withdrawing from routes between capital cities; Rex continued regional services with government financial support and was acquired by the United States holding company Air T in December 2025. Virgin Australia's share of domestic passengers rose to 34.4% in March 2025 from 31.3% a year earlier, while Qantas and Jetstar together carried more than 60%. By June 2026 the ACCC reported that the Qantas Group and Virgin Australia operated 98.5% of domestic passenger flights, while noting interest from two prospective entrants. Industry on-time arrivals reached 82.9% in April 2026, the highest since February 2022, and the cancellation rate was 1.9%. The government stated in the 2026–27 budget that it intended to extend the ACCC's airline monitoring to December 2029. Writing in Bloomberg, Tim Culpan argued that Australia's sparse population and lack of a natural hub geography may make a concentrated market structurally difficult to avoid.

=== International capacity ===
Access for foreign carriers is governed by bilateral air services agreements. In July 2023 the federal transport minister, Catherine King, refused an application by Qatar Airways for additional weekly services to Sydney, Melbourne, Brisbane and Perth, citing the national interest; the refusal was criticised by tourism bodies, Virgin Australia and two former ACCC chairs, and King later said she had not taken the commercial interests of Qantas or Virgin Australia into account. In September 2023 the Senate established a select committee on bilateral air service agreements, which recommended that the government review the decision and that future decisions be supported by cost–benefit analysis, consultation with the ACCC and a published statement of reasons; the government declined to revisit it. In March 2025 the ACCC authorised an integrated alliance under which Virgin Australia would operate 28 new weekly return services between Doha and the same four cities using wet-leased Qatar Airways aircraft and crew, doubling frequencies on the route from June 2025.

=== Consumer protection ===
On 8 October 2024 the Federal Court ordered Qantas to pay A$100 million in penalties after the airline admitted breaching the Australian Consumer Law by offering and selling tickets for flights it had already decided to cancel, and by failing to promptly notify existing ticket holders; Qantas separately undertook to pay about $20 million to affected consumers and changed the systems that had given rise to the conduct. The Aviation White Paper, released on 26 August 2024, proposed an independent ombuds scheme and a charter of customer rights, and the Sydney Airport Demand Management Amendment Act 2024 introduced civil penalties for the misuse of airport slots together with new reporting requirements. As at mid-2026 no aviation ombuds scheme was in operation; an interim ombudsperson within the transport department had no investigative or complaint-resolution powers, and bills to establish an Aviation Consumer Ombudsperson, an Aviation Consumer Protection Authority and a statutory consumer protections charter were introduced to parliament in April 2026.

== Statistics ==
The BITRE international airline activity series recorded 33.4 thousand tonnes of freight in 1970–71 and 1,119.2 thousand tonnes in 2024–25.

Raw data
Observed international airline freight activity in Australia by financial year, 1970–71 to 2024–25, in thousand tonnes.

=== Top 30 routes by annual passenger numbers ===
Data retrieved from Department of Infrastructure, Regional Development and Cities
| Rank | City 1 | City 2 | Distance (km) | 2008 | 2009 | 2010 | 2011 | 2012 | 2013 | 2014 | 2015 | 2016 | 2017 |
|---|---|---|---|---|---|---|---|---|---|---|---|---|---|
| 1 | (Victoria (state)) Melbourne | (New South Wales) Sydney | 707 | 7,008,000 | 7,088,600 | 7,901,100 | 7,727,500 | 8,047,700 | 8,244,000 | 8,316,900 | 8,613,400 | 8,904,700 | 9,097,100 |
| 2 | (Queensland) Brisbane | (New South Wales) Sydney | 752 | 4,306,500 | 4,295,800 | 4,397,500 | 4,406,000 | 4,390,700 | 4,425,100 | 4,448,100 | 4,476,200 | 4,658,100 | 4,736,300 |
| 3 | (Queensland) Brisbane | (Victoria (state)) Melbourne | 1379 | 2,688,500 | 2,706,200 | 3,020,200 | 3,090,400 | 3,189,600 | 3,198,800 | 3,317,100 | 3,353,800 | 3,493,300 | 3,541,100 |
| 4 | (Queensland) Gold Coast | (New South Wales) Sydney | 679 | 2,164,800 | 2,148,000 | 2,405,000 | 2,244,800 | 2,440,600 | 2,559,100 | 2,595,200 | 2,618,300 | 2,704,400 | 2,740,700 |
| 5 | (South Australia) Adelaide | (Victoria (state)) Melbourne | 642 | 2,122,700 | 2,103,800 | 2,271,400 | 2,186,700 | 2,085,200 | 2,195,100 | 2,272,000 | 2,311,000 | 2,393,900 | 2,456,400 |
| 6 | (Victoria (state)) Melbourne | (Western Australia) Perth | 2705 | 1,772,200 | 1,724,900 | 1,736,400 | 1,855,900 | 2,130,700 | 2,290,700 | 2,160,700 | 2,138,900 | 2,072,900 | 2,033,200 |
| 7 | (Queensland) Gold Coast | (Victoria (state)) Melbourne | 1328 | 1,673,500 | 1,615,800 | 1,767,600 | 1,671,300 | 1,790,700 | 1,675,400 | 1,754,000 | 1,812,300 | 1,966,100 | 2,012,600 |
| 8 | (South Australia) Adelaide | (New South Wales) Sydney | 1167 | 1,589,100 | 1,600,200 | 1,785,700 | 1,722,700 | 1,751,200 | 1,751,900 | 1,813,000 | 1,831,500 | 1,872,000 | 1,898,300 |
| 9 | (Western Australia) Perth | (New South Wales) Sydney | 3285 | 1,493,200 | 1,465,100 | 1,622,700 | 1,731,700 | 1,811,400 | 1,800,400 | 1,798,900 | 1,760,900 | 1,753,700 | 1,716,500 |
| 10 | (Tasmania) Hobart | (Victoria (state)) Melbourne | 616 | 1,157,800 | 1,202,300 | 1,231,900 | 1,157,900 | 1,239,100 | 1,388,800 | 1,400,100 | 1,493,600 | 1,555,500 | 1,630,300 |
| 11 | (Queensland) Brisbane | (Queensland) Cairns | 1387 | 1,196,500 | 1,154,800 | 1,153,800 | 1,108,000 | 1,187,000 | 1,199,600 | 1,256,100 | 1,307,000 | 1,346,900 | 1,377,900 |
| 12 | (Australian Capital Territory) Canberra | (Victoria (state)) Melbourne | 470 | 1,068,500 | 1,093,800 | 1,038,000 | 1,065,200 | 1,003,100 | 994,500 | 972,300 | 984,200 | 1,026,100 | 1,133,000 |
| 13 | (Queensland) Cairns | (New South Wales) Sydney | 1967 | 940,300 | 832,900 | 876,800 | 894,300 | 933,900 | 978,600 | 1,000,900 | 1,032,600 | 1,115,300 | 1,129,300 |
| 14 | (Queensland) Brisbane | (Western Australia) Perth | 3615 | 683,400 | 718,000 | 755,100 | 867,500 | 951,500 | 1,017,700 | 1,062,000 | 1,007,800 | 984,100 | 969,100 |
| 15 | (Queensland) Brisbane | (Queensland) Townsville | 1110 | 968,700 | 942,600 | 941,100 | 977,400 | 994,200 | 957,500 | 948,200 | 965,300 | 976,600 | 960,200 |
| 16 | (Australian Capital Territory) Canberra | (New South Wales) Sydney | 237 | 959,500 | 1,021,800 | 1,096,200 | 1,069,100 | 1,053,200 | 1,027,600 | 968,200 | 946,800 | 959,400 | 949,200 |
| 17 | (Tasmania) Launceston | (Victoria (state)) Melbourne | 476 | 842,900 | 832,800 | 838,200 | 790,500 | 835,800 | 872,800 | 878,300 | 880,500 | 918,000 | 923,200 |
| 18 | (South Australia) Adelaide | (Queensland) Brisbane | 1621 | 660,300 | 637,000 | 717,100 | 679,800 | 729,200 | 747,500 | 776,700 | 792,800 | 830,300 | 849,600 |
| 19 | (Queensland) Cairns | (Victoria (state)) Melbourne | 2305 | 482,200 | 389,800 | 451,100 | 504,800 | 581,700 | 677,600 | 711,800 | 770,600 | 823,400 | 841,300 |
| 20 | (Queensland) Brisbane | (Queensland) Mackay | 795 | 727,100 | 735,900 | 798,000 | 908,900 | 964,900 | 863,500 | 746,400 | 696,400 | 678,500 | 697,900 |
| 21 | (Tasmania) Hobart | (New South Wales) Sydney | 1038 | 458,700 | 490,300 | 502,800 | 472,800 | 477,900 | 517,200 | 536,400 | 546,300 | 616,600 | 655,900 |
| 22 | (South Australia) Adelaide | (Western Australia) Perth | 2120 | 577,600 | 626,000 | 599,000 | 592,500 | 621,700 | 624,300 | 616,400 | 611,000 | 617,100 | 614,100 |
| 23 | (Queensland) Brisbane | (Australian Capital Territory) Canberra | 954 | 609,500 | 604,500 | 612,700 | 620,500 | 605,400 | 583,000 | 560,200 | 558,200 | 576,100 | 594,300 |
| 24 | (Queensland) Brisbane | (New South Wales) Newcastle | 613 | 529,300 | 564,300 | 579,100 | 582,200 | 591,800 | 583,700 | 570,300 | 543,700 | 574,000 | 590,700 |
| 25 | (Queensland) Sunshine Coast | (New South Wales) Sydney | 835 | 477,600 | 446,700 | 460,300 | 475,100 | 463,300 | 464,600 | 464,100 | 481,800 | 539,800 | 582,700 |
| 26 | (Queensland) Brisbane | (Queensland) Rockhampton | 517 | 569,600 | 600,600 | 643,900 | 606,400 | 644,400 | 636,100 | 612,600 | 587,800 | 563,800 | 522,100 |
| 27 | (Victoria (state)) Melbourne | (Queensland) Sunshine Coast | 1452 | 452,100 | 412,300 | 403,200 | 382,000 | 324,600 | 392,200 | 397,600 | 406,000 | 441,800 | 485,800 |
| 28 | (Victoria (state)) Melbourne | (New South Wales) Newcastle | 835 | 416,800 | 369,000 | 370,700 | 429,700 | 425,200 | 437,500 | 434,900 | 443,000 | 449,500 | 476,100 |
| 29 | (Western Australia) Karratha | (Western Australia) Perth | 1247 | - | 518,300 | 587,100 | 646,100 | 762,500 | 722,100 | 685,200 | 600,200 | 490,600 | 436,900 |
| 30 | (Queensland) Brisbane | (Northern Territory) Darwin | 2850 | 341,600 | 381,600 | 367,200 | 366,000 | 367,000 | 375,900 | 391,500 | 396,200 | 407,700 | 406,200 |

=== Busiest airports ===
Domestic Airport passenger numbers are calculated by the Department of Infrastructure and Transport and include passenger numbers from the major domestic airlines only; these being Qantas, Virgin Australia, Jetstar and Tiger Australia. Rex Airlines, QantasLink and similar airlines are considered to be regional airlines and are not included in these figures.

Monthly

Busiest Airports by Domestic Passenger Numbers Month of August 2024
| Rank | Airport | State | Total Aug 2023 | Total Aug 2024 | Monthly Change % |
|---|---|---|---|---|---|
| 1. | Sydney Airport | New South Wales | 2,024,800 | 2,077,600 | ▲2.6 |
| 2. | Melbourne Airport | (Victoria (state)) Victoria | 1,967,900 | 1,951,500 | ▼-0.8 |
| 3. | Brisbane Airport | Queensland | 1,416,100 | 1,474,200 | ▲4.1 |
| 4. | Perth Airport | Western Australia | 707,200 | 752,300 | ▲6.4 |
| 5. | Adelaide Airport | South Australia | 594,000 | 599,000 | ▲0.8 |
| 6. | Gold Coast Airport | Queensland | 441,400 | 432,100 | ▼-2.1 |
| 7. | Cairns Airport | Queensland | 381,700 | 380,400 | ▼-0.3 |
| 8. | Canberra Airport | Australian Capital Territory | 239,300 | 241,500 | ▲0.9 |
| 9. | Hobart Airport | Tasmania | 184,200 | 197,900 | ▲7.4 |
| 10. | Darwin Airport | Northern Territory | 165,000 | 164,600 | ▼-0.3 |

Yearly

Busiest Airports by Domestic Passenger Numbers FY 2023–2024
| Rank | Airport | State | FY 2022–23 | FY 2023–24 | Change % |
|---|---|---|---|---|---|
| 1 | Sydney Airport | New South Wales | 23,327,600 | 24,777,200 | ▲6.2 |
| 2 | Melbourne Airport | (Victoria (state)) Victoria | 22,494,300 | 24,061,500 | ▲7.0 |
| 3 | Brisbane Airport | Queensland | 15,814,800 | 16,665,500 | ▲5.4 |
| 4 | Perth Airport | Western Australia | 8,098,900 | 8,598,100 | ▲6.2 |
| 5 | Adelaide Airport | South Australia | 6,828,600 | 7,298,200 | ▲6.9 |
| 6 | Gold Coast Airport | Queensland | 5,425,700 | 5,620,400 | ▲3.6 |
| 7 | Cairns Airport | Queensland | 3,905,500 | 4,052,600 | ▲3.8 |
| 8 | Canberra Airport | Australian Capital Territory | 2,713,200 | 2,795,100 | ▲3.0 |
| 9 | Hobart Airport | Tasmania | 2,499,900 | 2,651,700 | ▲6.1 |
| 10 | Darwin Airport | Northern Territory | 1,624,600 | 1,895,600 | ▲16.7 |

== See also ==
- 1989 Australian pilots' dispute
- List of Australian airports
- List of airlines of Australia

== Bibliography ==
- Grant, Jim. "From Theory to Production: Australian Aviation Development 1870 to 1939". Air Enthusiast, No. 83, September–October 1999, pp. 58–61. ISSN 0143-5450
