= Project Sunrise (Qantas) =

Ultra long-haul project by Qantas

The first Airbus A350-1000ULR built for Project Sunrise at Melbourne Airport after its non-stop test flight from Toulouse in July 2026

Project Sunrise is an initiative by Qantas to operate the world's first non-stop commercial flights from Australia's east coast to London, New York, and potentially other ultra-long-haul destinations.

The project was launched in 2017 when Qantas challenged Boeing and Airbus to develop aircraft with the necessary range and performance. The company conducted research into crew and passenger fatigue, and tested approaches for minimising jetlag on extremely long flights. Qantas chose a modified version of the Airbus A350 in 2019, but the COVID-19 pandemic delayed its aircraft order until 2022, and the first delivery has since been postponed several times, to April 2027. The first of twelve Airbus A350-1000ULR aircraft ordered by Qantas for the project conducted test flights between Airbus's Toulouse headquarters and Melbourne in July 2026, setting what was reported to be a distance record for a commercial airliner. Qantas plans to start passenger service between Sydney and London in October 2027, and between Sydney and New York in mid-2028.

The aircraft has an additional fuel tank that allows flights of up to 22 hours. Qantas has configured them with 238 seats in four classes, far fewer than other airlines' A350-1000s and with a high proportion of premium seats, as well as a "Wellbeing Zone" where passengers can stretch; the cabin lighting, meals and service are designed to reduce jetlag. Qantas expects the flights to add about A$400 million to its annual earnings once all twelve aircraft are in service. Commentators have noted the extensive publicity the project has generated, while critics have questioned the environmental impact of ultra-long-haul flights.

== Background ==
The first scheduled passenger flights between Australia and the UK started in 1935, operated jointly by Imperial Airways and Qantas Empire Airways and taking about 12 1/2 days to complete the journey. In 1947, Qantas started operating the entire route, dubbed the Kangaroo Route. The journey then took four days. The duration and the number of stops have reduced over time, as airliner performance and range have increased. In August 1989 a new Qantas Boeing 747-400, City of Canberra, flew non-stop from London to Sydney on its delivery flight in just over 20 hours, and in March 2018 Qantas began Boeing 787–9 flights between Perth and London, the first regular non-stop service between Australia and Europe.

In 2017, Qantas initiated a project to offer non-stop flights to London and other ultra-long-haul destinations from Australia's east coast. The name "Project Sunrise" was adopted as a homage to the Double Sunrise services operated by Qantas in 1943–1945 between Perth and Ceylon (now Sri Lanka), which remained airborne for more than 24 hours – the longest for 31 hours and 15 minutes – long enough for those on board to see two sunrises.

== Development of the project ==
=== Initial announcement ===
Qantas chief executive Alan Joyce announced the project in August 2017, when presenting the airline's annual results, challenging Boeing and Airbus to produce an aircraft that could fly routes such as Sydney–London, Brisbane–Paris and Melbourne–New York non-stop with a full payload by 2022. The challenge was also posted on the airline's Twitter account, and Joyce later wrote that he followed it up with letters to Dennis Muilenburg of Boeing and Fabrice Brégier of Airbus, to make clear that it "wasn't a PR stunt". A Qantas fact sheet issued with the announcement showed indicative routes from Sydney, Melbourne and Brisbane to London, New York, Paris, Cape Town and Rio de Janeiro. Boeing worked on a version of its 777X and Airbus on a version of its A350, and in August 2018 Joyce said that both manufacturers had convinced Qantas that they could build an aircraft capable of the flights.

=== Aircraft competition and research flights ===
In 2019, proposals were submitted by both airframers: ultra-long-range variants of the Airbus A350 and Boeing 777X. In August 2019 Boeing announced delays in the 777-8 project, but Qantas said that this did not put the aircraft out of contention for Project Sunrise. Qantas also needed regulatory approval for duty periods longer than existing fatigue rules allowed, and sought productivity improvements of about 30% from its pilots; in November 2019 it asked both manufacturers to improve their offers.

To study the effects of ultra-long-haul flying, Qantas operated three non-stop "research flights" using new Boeing 787–9 aircraft being delivered from Boeing's factory, carrying only a few dozen people, mostly Qantas staff, so that the aircraft were light enough to cover the distance. The first, from New York to Sydney on 18–20 October 2019, lasted 19 hours and 16 minutes and covered 16,200 kilometres (10,100 mi); the second, from London to Sydney on 14–15 November, lasted 19 hours and 19 minutes; and the third, from New York in December, lasted 19 hours and 31 minutes. These test flights gathered data on crew and passenger fatigue; for the crew, this included activity monitoring, sleep diaries, cognitive testing and monitoring of melatonin levels. Researchers from the University of Sydney's Charles Perkins Centre monitored the passengers, while Monash University researchers monitored the pilots' brain activity. Passengers on the first two flights followed schedules of meals, light exposure and exercise intended to reduce jetlag, while the third flight, which offered a standard in-flight service, provided control data.

=== Ordering of the aircraft ===
In December 2019 Qantas announced that its preferred aircraft for the project was the Airbus A350-1000, which would receive an additional fuel tank and slightly increased MTOW to deliver the performance required on the Project Sunrise routes. Qantas stated that it was working with Airbus to order up to 12 aircraft, with the final decision expected in 2020. It also said that the Civil Aviation Safety Authority (CASA) had provisionally advised that it saw no regulatory obstacles to the flights, which were planned to start in the first half of 2023.

Qantas said that negotiations on a new agreement with its long-haul pilots were aimed at closing "the last remaining gap" in the business case. During negotiations with the Australian and International Pilots Association, Qantas told its pilots in February 2020 that without an agreement it would have the flights operated by a separate employment entity; the pilots approved a new agreement in March 2020. In February 2020 CASA approved a new Qantas fatigue risk management system, although the regulator said that Project Sunrise flights, which would involve pilot duty periods of up to 23 hours, would require further approval.

The Qantas board approved the project in March 2020, but the aircraft order was put on hold as the COVID-19 pandemic halted international travel. In May 2020 Joyce said that there was "huge potential for Project Sunrise, but the time is not right now".

In May 2022, after the board had approved the project for a second time, Qantas placed a formal order for 12 Airbus A350-1000 aircraft, with the aim of commencing service from Sydney in late 2025. Qantas said that the business case had an internal rate of return "in the mid-teens", and that the flights would be carbon neutral from launch.

=== Delays ===
In February 2024 Qantas announced that due to manufacturing delays (which Airbus attributed to the need to redesign the extra fuel tank), delivery of the A350-1000 aircraft would be delayed by about six months, to mid-2026. Certification of the third centre fuel tank was confirmed in June 2024. A further delay of about two months, announced in February 2025, made a launch before 2027 unlikely. In November 2025, with the first aircraft on the assembly line in Toulouse, Qantas said that it expected to take delivery in late 2026 and to start commercial operations in the first half of 2027. In May 2026 Airbus postponed the first delivery to April 2027, citing supply-chain problems; Qantas said that four more aircraft would follow by November 2027.

=== Flight testing ===
The first A350-1000ULR made its maiden flight on 2 June 2026, flying for 3 hours and 43 minutes over France. Fitted with more than a thousand sensors, it was used for a two-month flight-test campaign to certify the aircraft's modifications with the European Union Aviation Safety Agency, after which it is to be refitted to Qantas's specifications. The first aircraft to be delivered to Qantas, named Vega, was still on the assembly line during the test campaign.

Airbus conducted two non-stop test flights from Toulouse to Melbourne and back, using the first A350-1000ULR destined for Qantas. The first leg from Toulouse to Melbourne was flown on 23 and 24 July; a flight which lasted 19 hours and covered a distance of almost 17,000 kilometres (11,000 mi; 9,200 nmi). Four Airbus test pilots and five flight-test engineers were on board. The return leg was flown a few days later on 27 and 28 July, this time on a transpacific route over the US and Canada. Two Qantas pilots joined the Airbus crew for this leg, which continued across the Atlantic south of Greenland and over the United Kingdom to Toulouse. The flight lasted 24 hours and 24 minutes and covered around 23,100 kilometres (14,400 mi; 12,500 nmi), setting what was reported to be a new distance record for a commercial airliner. Guinness World Records had listed a 2005 flight by a Boeing 777-200LR from Hong Kong to London, covering 21,602 kilometres (13,423 mi), as the longest flight by an unmodified commercial aircraft; at the end of July, Airbus was still evaluating with the relevant authorities whether the 2026 flight qualified as an official world record. Airbus described it as a development flight intended to show that the aircraft could perform a 23-hour flight and to test its fuel-management and air-conditioning systems. More than 3.6 million people followed the return flight on Flightradar24, the second-highest number for any flight tracked by the service.

=== Route announcements ===
On 17 June 2026, at an event in Toulouse at which it displayed Vega, the first aircraft due to be delivered, Qantas chief executive Vanessa Hudson announced that Sydney–London would be the first Project Sunrise route, with daily flights from October 2027 and tickets going on sale in February 2027. On 23 September 2026 Qantas announced that flights between Sydney and New York would follow from mid-2028. These would be the first non-stop commercial flights between Australia's east coast and London or New York.

== Aircraft ==
The A350-1000ULR (ultra long range) is the fourth passenger variant of the Airbus A350 family. Its main modification is an additional rear centre fuel tank with a capacity of 20,900 litres (5,500 US gal), which Airbus says increases the aircraft's range by 1,000 nautical miles (1,900 km) and enables non-stop flights of almost 10,000 nautical miles (18,500 km), lasting up to 22 hours. The aircraft also has a reinforced structure, a higher maximum takeoff weight and a new galley cooling system, and is powered by Rolls-Royce Trent XWB-97 engines. Joyce later wrote that after the 2010 engine failure on Qantas Flight 32, Qantas had privately agreed never to buy another Rolls-Royce engine, but that Rolls-Royce's engineering response, including a re-engineered engine, "ultimately helped shift our thinking", and that the Trent XWB-97 already had "a solid reliability record".

Qantas's aircraft have 238 seats, compared with more than 300 on other airlines' A350-1000s; the lower seat count gives passengers more space and saves weight, allowing more fuel to be carried. Qantas has an exclusivity arrangement with Airbus that prevents other airlines from receiving the variant until its order has been fulfilled, although Airbus has said that other airlines are interested in it. The aircraft are being named after stars, as were the Catalina flying boats used on the Double Sunrise flights; the first to be delivered is named Vega.

== Cabin and passenger experience ==
The cabins were designed by the Australian industrial designer David Caon in collaboration with researchers from the Charles Perkins Centre. Qantas unveiled the designs of the first and business class cabins in February 2023 and of the remaining cabins, at a launch in New York, in June 2023. The 238 seats would be split into six first class suites (three-abreast), 52 business class suites (four-abreast), 40 premium economy seats at 40″ pitch (eight-abreast) and 140 economy class seats at 33″ pitch (nine-abreast). Each first class suite has a sliding door, a separate reclining armchair and a two-metre bed, and the business class suites also have sliding doors; Qantas has not previously offered suites with doors. The economy seat pitch is the largest of any Qantas economy cabin, although some rows are slightly tighter, and 42 "Economy Plus" seats at the front of the cabin have a 34-inch (86 cm) pitch. Caon aimed to give the cabins a "residential feel", using fabric rather than leather seat covers, partly because leather is heavier. The first and business class seats are made by Safran and the economy seats by Recaro. Additionally, "fast and free" Wi-Fi onboard was promised.

Between the premium economy and economy cabins is a "Wellbeing Zone", a space where passengers can stretch and move, with sculpted wall panels and integrated handles, guided exercise content on a screen and a self-service hydration and snack station; alcohol is not served there. Caon said that passengers on long flights "know that they need to get up and move, but they needed somewhere to go", and that early concepts for the space had included exercise bikes. The Wellbeing Zone won the passenger comfort category of the 2024 Crystal Cabin Awards.

The cabin environment and in-flight service are designed with the aim of reducing jetlag. In tests on the 2019 research flights, passengers who followed optimised schedules of light exposure, meals, sleep and movement reported jetlag lasting about two days less, and were more alert after the flight, than those who followed a traditional schedule. Factors such as meal timings and light exposure will be adjusted in order to mitigate jetlag. The cabin lighting, developed during more than 150 hours of trials in an A350 cabin mock-up at Airbus's facility in Hamburg, has twelve lighting scenes – including "Awake", "Sunset" and a "Sunrise" scene that moves from the front of the cabin to the rear – intended to help passengers adjust to the time zone of their destination; passengers in first class can set their own lighting sequence.

== Operations ==
Sydney–London flights are scheduled to leave Sydney daily in the afternoon and arrive in London early the next morning, taking about 19 hours 25 minutes to 21 hours from Sydney and 18 to 20 hours in the other direction, depending on winds. Most flights will be routed via the Middle East, but during the northern winter around 20% of flights to London will instead head north across the Pacific and over the North Pole to take advantage of the jet stream. Routes are to be planned using Qantas's own flight-planning system, Constellation, which takes account of winds, weather and airspace restrictions, and Qantas may block some seats to save fuel when weather conditions require.

Flights between Sydney and New York are planned to start in mid-2028, with tickets going on sale in August 2027; Qantas expects them to take about 18 hours, more than three hours less than its current one-stop services. Earlier plans had also included non-stop flights from Melbourne and Brisbane, but in 2026 Qantas said that further routes would be announced progressively as aircraft were delivered, depending on demand; Hudson said that the aircraft would "absolutely operate out of Melbourne" in future. Qantas has also said that some of the aircraft could eventually be used on existing routes from Melbourne to Dallas and Los Angeles.

Qantas plans to train more than 360 pilots and 1,200 cabin crew to operate the aircraft, and its pilots have begun training on Australia's first A350 flight simulator, in Sydney. The Australian and International Pilots Association has said that its preferred model for flights of around 20 hours is to operate with three pilots qualified to land the aircraft, and in 2024 Qantas's chief medical officer said that the airline would initially take a "more conservative" approach to crewing. Under a 2024 agreement with the Flight Attendants' Association of Australia, cabin crew on Project Sunrise flights are to receive 60-hour layovers, and a majority of the cabin crew on the flights must be employed by Qantas's mainline operation.

== Business case ==
Qantas expects the Project Sunrise flights to drive an annual earnings increase of A$400 million (US$261 million) in the first full year with all 12 aircraft in service. The business case relies on premium travellers: about 41% of the seats are in premium cabins, compared with 29% on Qantas's Airbus A380s, and Qantas has said that it expects to charge fares about 20% higher than for one-stop journeys. The airline has cited the performance of its non-stop Perth–London flights, which it describes as its best commercially performing route, as evidence of demand for non-stop services.

Aviation analyst John Strickland said that what Qantas was selling was time, and that it would need to obtain a premium in all cabins; analysts also said in 2026 that higher fuel prices resulting from the 2026 Iran war had raised the project's break-even point. Other commentators argued that the conflict, which disrupted travel through hubs in the Persian Gulf, had strengthened the case for non-stop flights.

== Reception ==
The project has attracted extensive media coverage. In their 2023 book about Joyce's tenure at Qantas, Peter Harbison and Derek Sadubin described it as "a masterclass in marketing" that had "generated massively more global coverage than Qantas's advertising budget ever could". Other commentators were more critical: The Australian Financial Review columnist Joe Aston described the 2019 research flights as "PR joyrides", and Cam Wallace, who later became chief executive of Qantas International, said that as an Air New Zealand executive in 2017 he had dismissed the project as "a PR stunt".

Critics have also questioned the environmental impact of the flights. Because ultra-long-haul aircraft must carry more fuel and fewer passengers, emissions per passenger can be higher than on a journey with a stopover, and in 2019 the UK's Committee on Climate Change said that new flights expanding the long-haul market would hinder efforts to reach net-zero emissions. Qantas said that it would offset the emissions of the research flights and of Project Sunrise services. In 2026 a European Commission proposal to extend the European Union Emissions Trading System to international flights departing the European Union excluded destinations more than 5,000 kilometres (3,100 mi) away, which would exempt any future non-stop flights between EU cities and Australia; Harbison wrote that the distinction could not be defended environmentally.
