= Ultra long-haul =

Descriptor for 16-hour-plus flights

Ultra-long-haul flights, also known as ultra-long-range operations, refer to a flight scheduled to last over 16 hours as jointly defined by IATA, ICAO, and IFALPA .

These flights usually follow a great circle route over a polar region. Non-stop ultra-long-haul routes may be less preferable to stopover flights as passengers are required to remain seated on an aircraft for an extended duration. A low-oil-price environment favors the establishment and operation of ultra-long-haul flights.

Singapore Airlines Flights 23 and 24 between Changi Airport and John F. Kennedy International Airport are currently the longest regularly scheduled flights in the world, covering 15,349 km (9,537 mi; 8,288 nmi) in around 18 hours and 40 minutes.

== History ==
Ultra-long-haul flights lasting over 16 hours have existed since the 1930s. While modern jet aircraft travel at faster speeds and cover longer distances, the record for the longest (by duration) scheduled commercial ultra-long-haul flight route was set in 1943. Some historical ultra-long-haul routes include:

- On October 21, 1936 the first scheduled commercial transpacific flight was operated by Pan American Airways on a Martin M-130 Flying Boat with 7 paying passengers on board from San Francisco to Pearl Harbor, Hawaii non-stop. It covered a distance of 3,871 kilometres (2,405 mi; 2,090 nmi) in 19 hours, 36 minutes.
- From 1943 to 1945, Qantas operated "The Double Sunrise", a weekly 5,650-kilometre (3,050 nmi) flight between Perth, Australia and Ceylon (now Sri Lanka), with average flight times of 28 to 33 hours using a Consolidated PBY Catalina Flying Boat.
- From October 1 to 2, 1957, a Trans World Airlines Lockheed L-1649 Starliner flew the first 8,640-kilometre (4,670 nmi) London–San Francisco polar route in 23 hours, 19 minutes.
- In February 1963, Aeroflot started a Moscow-Havana flight via Murmansk operated by a Tupolev Tu-114. It lasted for approximately 16 hours, the longest for a scheduled turboprop flight.
- On 1 March 2001, Russian airspace was opened for overflight purposes, allowing new circumpolar routes to come into use for commercial airlines.Continental Airlines launched a 13,578-kilometre (7,332 nmi) non-stop service from Newark to Hong Kong that exceeded 16 hours in duration. A few days later, United Airlines started its own JFK–Hong Kong service, adding 10 kilometers to the distance.
- On 3 February 2004, Singapore Airlines introduced a 14,113-kilometre (7,620 nmi) flight from Singapore to Los Angeles. It made the outward trip in 16 hours in summer and 15 hours in winter. In summer, the return trip lasted 17 hours, while it lasted 18 hours in winter.
- 28 June 2004, Singapore Airlines introduced Flight SQ 21 operated by the Airbus A340-500 on a 15,344-kilometre (8,285 nmi) great circle route from Newark to Singapore, passing within 130 kilometres (70 nmi) of the North Pole. It lasts about 18 hours. This was immediately surpassed by return Flight SQ 22, which flew a new record of 16,600-kilometre (9,000 nmi) back to Newark. Despite the greater distance, Flight SQ 22 averaged a slightly shorter 17 hours, 45 minutes because of prevailing high-altitude winds. Since October 2018, the Airbus A350-900ULR has flown the route.

In the late 2000s and early 2010s, rapidly rising fuel prices, coupled with the 2008 financial crisis, resulted in the cancellation of many ultra-long-haul non-stop "gas-guzzling four-engined" flights. This included services provided by Singapore Airlines from Singapore to Newark and Los Angeles that ended in late 2013. Similar flights from New York to both Mumbai and Bangkok were also terminated. As fuel prices started to decrease, which coincided with the introduction of more fuel efficient twinjet aircraft to the market, the economics of ultra-long-haul flights improved, so services for more distant markets were reinstated. By 2023, 29 of the 30 longest flights in the world were now all ultra-long-haul in duration.

- In 2016 and 2017, ultra-long-haul flights were launched from Dubai and Doha to Auckland respectively. Both routes became the longest duration active flights at the time of their launch.
- On October 18, 2018, Singapore Airlines relaunched flights SQ 21 and 22 using the Airbus A350-900ULR with a scheduled flight duration of 18 hours 45 minutes. It remained the world's longest scheduled ultra-long-haul commercial flight until its suspension on March 24, 2020 due to the global drop in demand due to the COVID-19 pandemic.
- In March 2020, due to the COVID-19 pandemic and the impossibility of transit in the US through Los Angeles International Airport, Air Tahiti Nui scheduled and operated Flight TN64 in March and April 2020 as a non-stop flight between Papeete and Paris Charles de Gaulle, using a Boeing 787-9 and covering 15,715 km (8,485 nmi; 9,765 mi) in a scheduled duration of 16 hours 20 minutes, setting a new record for the world's longest scheduled domestic commercial passenger flight.
- On November 9, 2020, Singapore Airlines launched the current world's longest ultra-long-haul commercial flight of SQ 23/24 between Singapore and New York JFK airport, with a scheduled duration of 18 hours 40 minutes to cover the great circle distance of 15,349 kilometres (8,288 nmi; 9,537 mi) using an Airbus A350-900ULR.

== Airliners ==
The longest range jetliner in service is the Airbus A350-900ULR, capable of flying up to 18,000 kilometres (9,700 nmi; 11,000 mi). The Airbus A380 is capable of flying 14,800 kilometres (8,000 nmi; 9,200 mi) with 544 passengers.

The longest range Boeing airliner in service is the 777-200LR, which can cover 17,395 kilometres (9,393 nmi; 10,809 mi) with 301 passengers. The Boeing 777-8X is capable of flying 16,170 kilometres (8,730 nmi; 10,050 mi) with 350 to 375 passengers. The Boeing 787-9 is capable of flying 14,800 kilometres (8,000 nmi; 9,200 mi) with 290 passengers. Longer ranges are possible when not carrying passengers.

Airliners like the Airbus A330neo, Airbus A350 and Boeing 787 enable economically sustainable non-stop ultra-long-haul operations on thinner routes with less demand. Previous-generation planes capable of providing non-stop ultra-long-haul services were larger and therefore more expensive to operate compared to these planes, which in turn required more tickets or high-end seating to be sold and more demand between both destinations to maintain the profitability of these services. Stretching zones, sleep pods, sky bars and high-speed internet have been introduced to compensate for the long duration of ultra-long-haul flights.

== See also ==
- Flight length
- Flight time
- Longest flights
- ETOPS/LROPS
- International flight
