= Kangaroo Route =

Flights between Britain and Australia over the Eastern Hemisphere

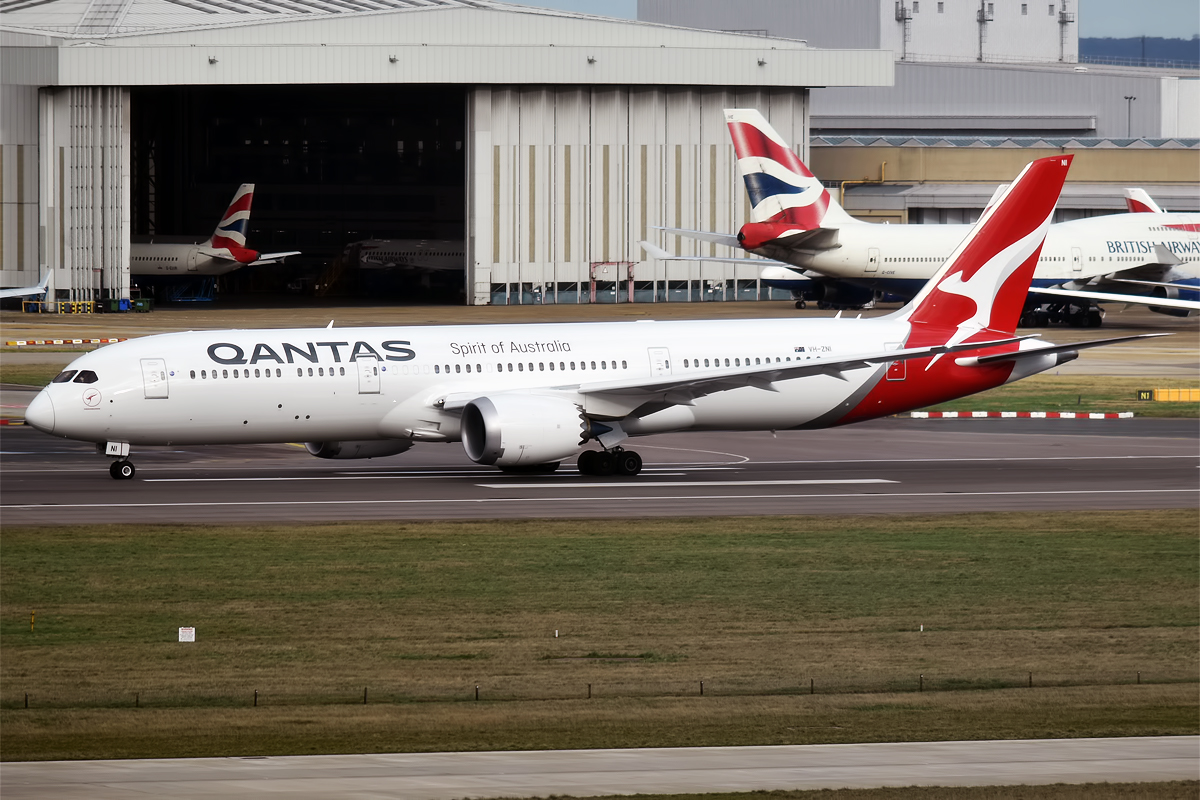
A Qantas Boeing 787-9 among British Airways aircraft at Heathrow Airport

The Kangaroo Route is a term coined by Qantas, referring to the commercial passenger air routes flown between Australia and the United Kingdom via the Eastern Hemisphere.

The route has been operated since 1934, but found its name in 1944 from the unique mode of travel of the kangaroo, as the route's "hops" were reminiscent of a kangaroo's, and both are used to cover long distances. The term is trademarked and traditionally used by Qantas, although it is often used in the media and by airline competitors to describe all Australia to United Kingdom flights.

In addition to Qantas, by 2003, over 20 airlines operated routes connecting Australia and the UK, including British Airways, Cathay Pacific, Emirates, Etihad, Malaysia Airlines, Qatar Airways, Singapore Airlines and Thai Airways with most involving a single transfer between flights at their respective hubs. Only British Airways and Qantas offer through direct flights (not requiring passengers to change plane en route), both making an intermediate stop at Changi Airport as of 2026.

Qantas commenced operating non-stop flights from Perth to London with Boeing 787s on 25 March 2018. This ended the era of the continents of Europe and Oceania not being connected by non-stop flights, marking the first time that all of the world's continents, excluding Antarctica, are connected by non-stop flights.

In 2027, Qantas' "Project Sunrise" will expand the nonstop Kangaroo Route even further, connecting Sydney to London in a single "hop", simultaneously taking the title of the longest non-stop commercial flight. Qantas has ordered the ultra-long-range version of the Airbus A350-1000ULR, which will be delivered in late 2026.

== Origins of the name ==
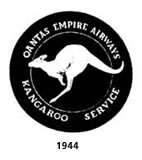
Qantas Logo for its "Kangaroo Service", used from 1944-1947

Qantas operated the Australian part of the Kangaroo Route for nine years before coining (and later trademarking) the name.

After starting airmail operations between Brisbane and Singapore in 1934, Qantas began operating passenger flights connecting Brisbane to Singapore in 1935 following successful awarding of the Australian government's tender.

After disruption to the route due to the emerging hostilities of World War II, the connectivity was famously restored by Qantas with its "Double Sunrise" service connectivity between Perth and Ceylon on the Indian Ocean Route with Catalina flying boats in 1943. With the addition of the land based Liberator aircraft to the route in 1944, the "Indian Ocean Route" was officially renamed "The Kangaroo Service" by Qantas' Managing Director Hudson Fysh and pilot Bill Crowther; a play on words of the aviation term "hop" (referring to a leg of a route), and the hop of a kangaroo, an Australian icon.

Along with the newly created Qantas logo of the flying kangaroo, the terms "Kangaroo Service" and "Kangaroo Route" were trademarked by Qantas and became the airline's branded term to describe Qantas' Australia-United Kingdom connectivity.

A significant milestone in 1947 when Qantas began operating the entire Kangaroo Route independently. This April 1947 inauguration is referred to as the birth date of the Kangaroo Route by Qantas, even though it had been operating a part of that route for almost a decade.

== History ==
=== First England to Australia flight (1919) ===
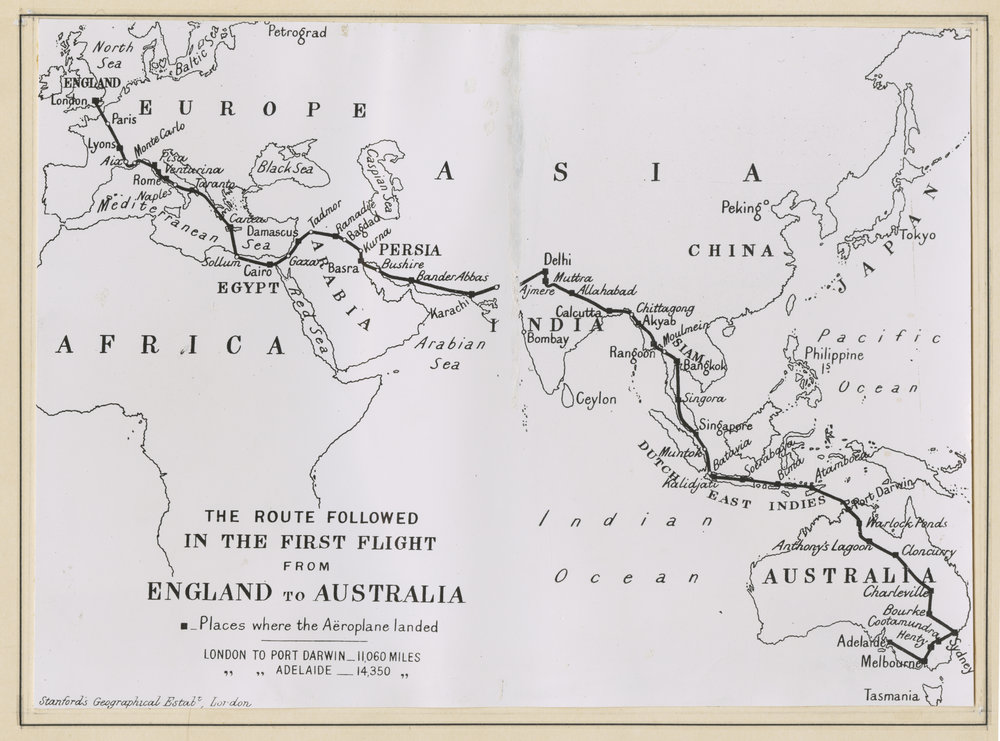
Route of the England to Australia flight, starting in London and finishing in Adelaide (1919)

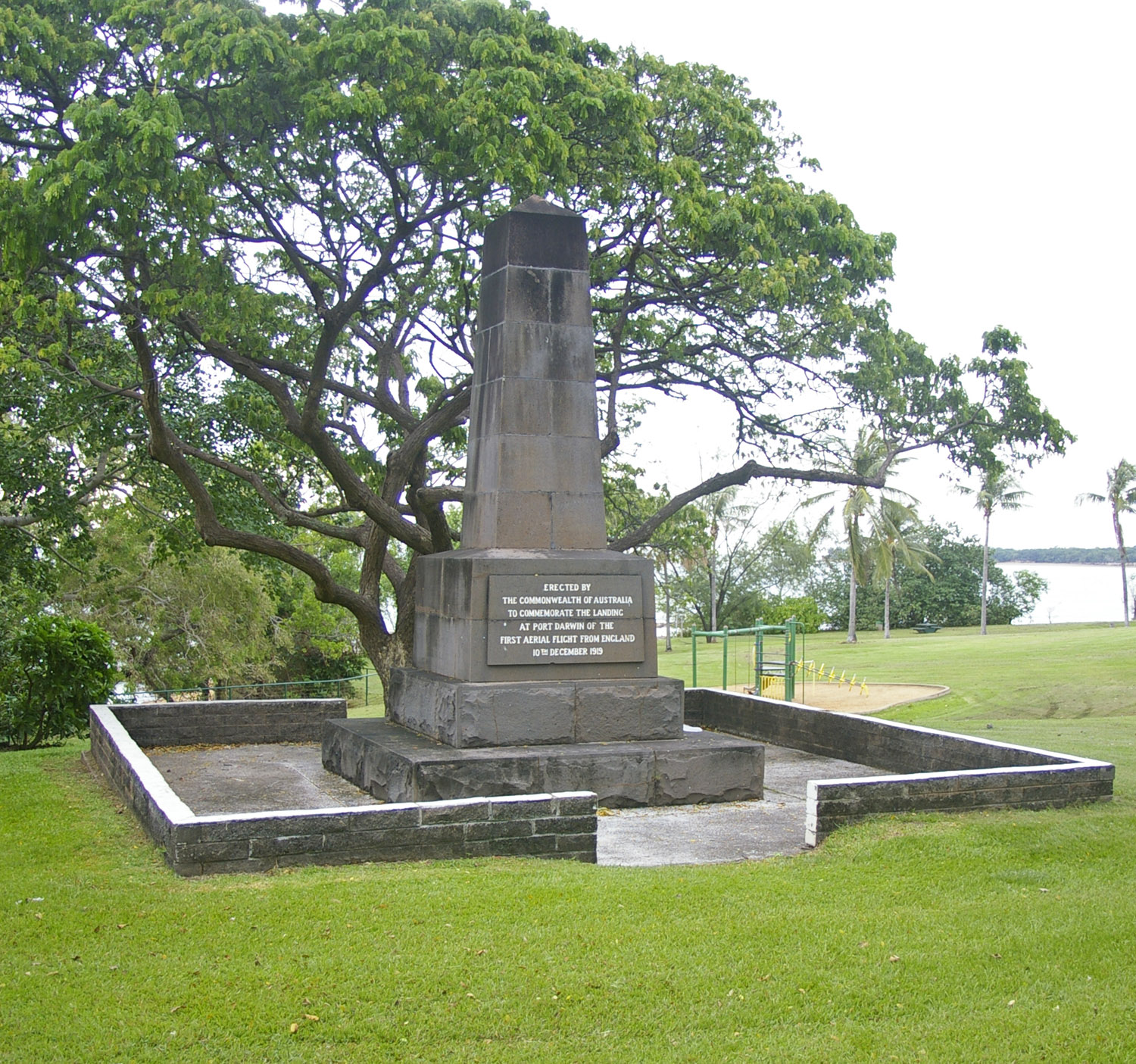
First Flight from England to Australia by Australians Monument in Darwin, Northern Territory, Australia

The first ever flight from the United Kingdom to Australia, sometimes known as The Great Air Race, took place in 1919. Of the six entries that started the race, the winners were South Australian brothers Ross and Keith Smith, serving as pilot and co-pilot respectively. They were also accompanied by mechanics James Bennett and Wally Shiers, all of whom made the successful journey of 14,350 kilometres (8,917 mi; 7,748 nmi) from London to Adelaide in a modified Vickers Vimy bomber. One other entrant reached Australia; the other four crashed en route, two of whose crews were killed.

Although the race had finished upon reaching Australia in Darwin, an extra leg of 3,290 kilometres (2,044 mi; 1,776 nmi) to the Smith brothers' hometown of Adelaide was undertaken. The prize-winning Vickers Vimy aircraft is displayed in a climate-controlled museum of the same name, in Adelaide Airport.

=== Early years (1935–1940) ===
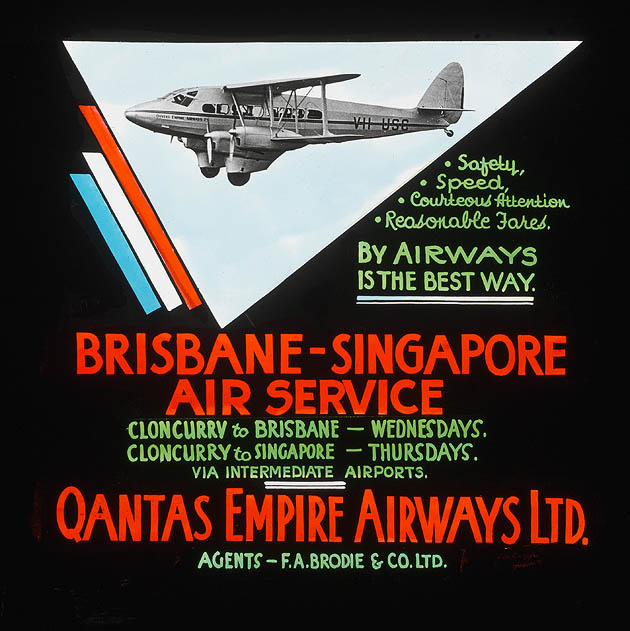
Advertisement for the Qantas Singapore service using the De Havilland 86

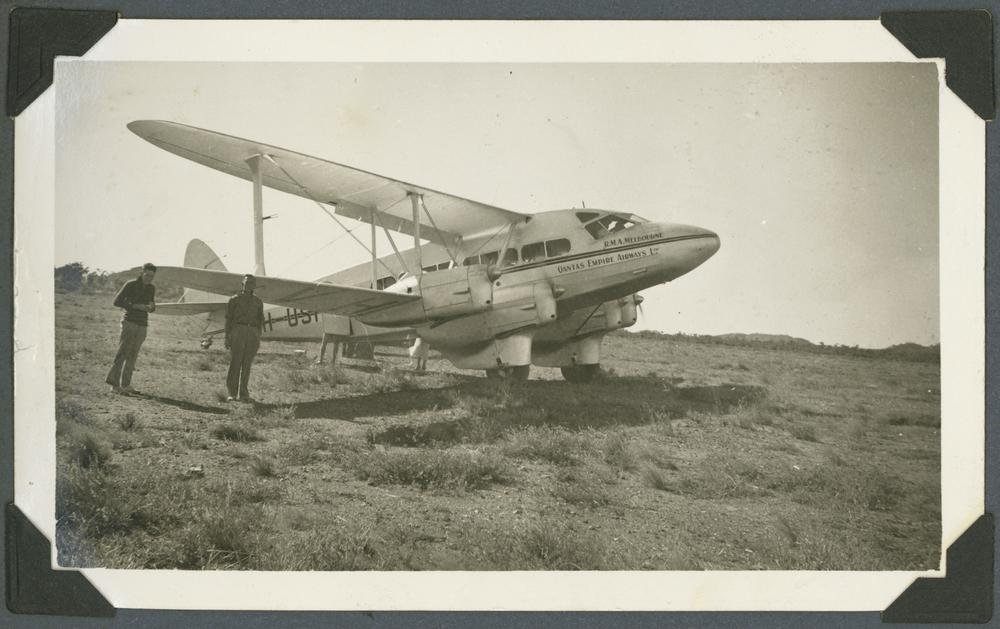
A QEA De Havilland 86 at Mt. Isa, operating the Kangaroo Route circa 1937.

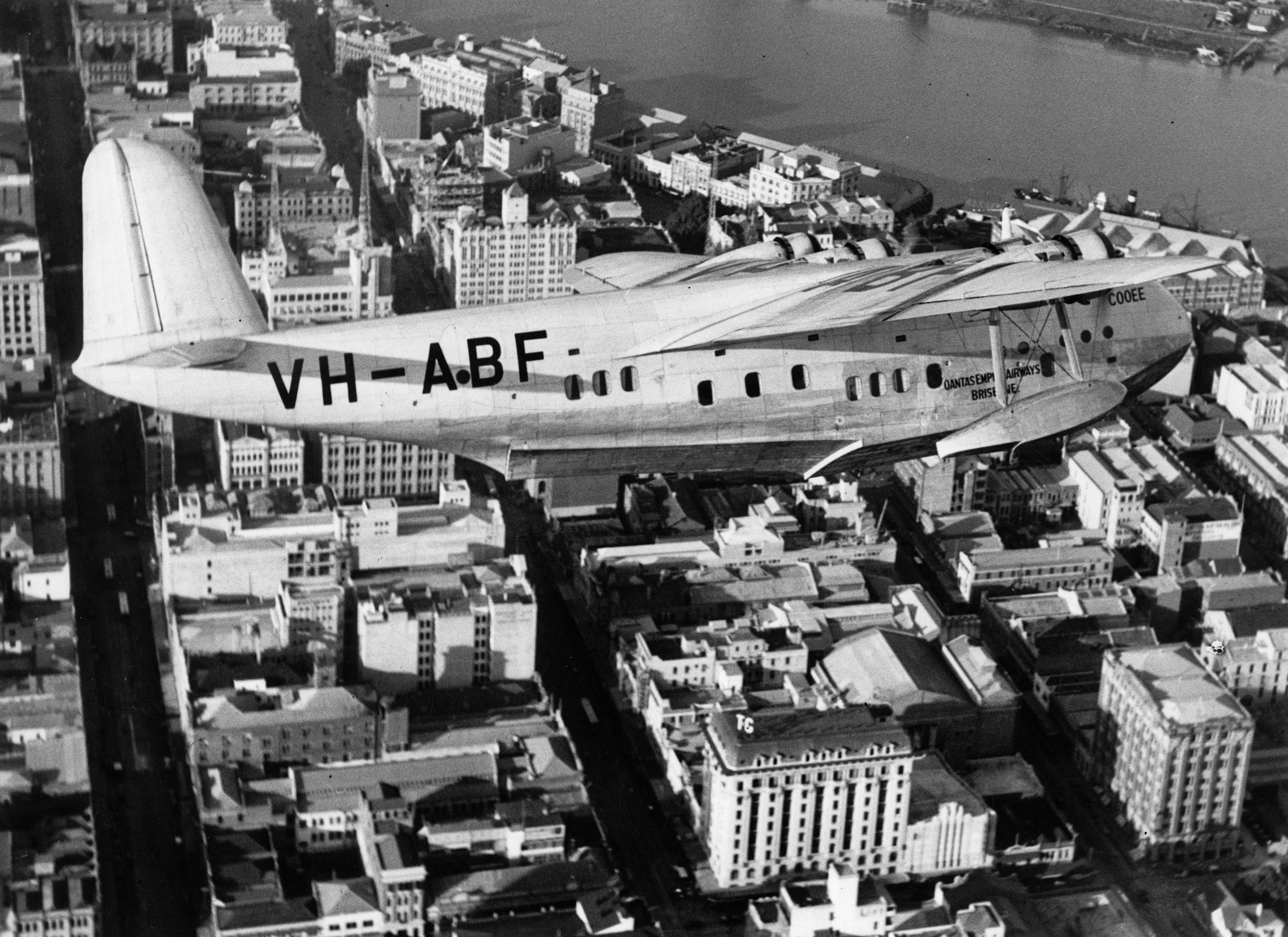
The QEA Short S23 Empire Flying Boat "Cooee", which inaugurated Qantas' seaplane-operated Kangaroo Route service to Singapore on 5 July 1938.

In 1935 Qantas started flying passengers to Singapore in a De Havilland 86 to connect with London-bound Imperial Airways. London to Brisbane service commenced on 13 April 1935. Imperial Airways and Qantas Empire Airways opened the 12,754-mile (20,526 km) London to Brisbane route for passengers for a single fare £195 (equivalent to $42,700 in 2022). There were no through bookings on the first service because of heavy sector bookings, but there were two through passengers on the next flight that left London on 20 April. The route opened for passengers from Brisbane to London on 17 April; flights were weekly and the journey time was 12 1/2 days.

Eastbound passengers from London would first fly from Croydon to Paris, take an overnight train to Brindisi, and fly onward with stops at Athens, Alexandria (overnight), Gaza, Baghdad (overnight), Basra, Kuwait, Bahrain, Sharjah (overnight), Gwadar, Karachi, Jodhpur (overnight), Delhi, Cawnpore, Allahabad, Calcutta (overnight), Akyab, Rangoon, Bangkok (overnight), Alor Star, Singapore (overnight), Batavia, Sourabaya, Rambang (overnight), Koepang, Darwin (overnight), Longreach (overnight), and Charleville. London-Karachi was operated by Imperial Airways, Karachi-Singapore jointly by Imperial and Indian Trans-Continental Airways, and Singapore-Brisbane by Qantas.

=== Wartime modified operations (1940–1946) ===
==== Impediment and interruption due to WWII (June 1941 – Feb 1942) ====
On 11 June 1941 Italy entered WWII and the Kangaroo Route connection across the Mediterranean Sea from Egypt was severed with the resulting loss of all access to commercial air routes. While direct passenger air connectivity was lost, previous contingency plans were put into action, utilising the structure of the "Horseshoe route" that connected Australia and England for passengers and airmail via Durban, South Africa where passengers would connect to steamboat service. This service was swiftly started just 8 days later with the first flight leaving Australia on 19 June 1940 and continuing its operation, modifying as necessary until its final reserve route ("Reserve Route 3") via Broome was lost on 15 February 1942 with the fall of Singapore.

Plans for restoration of the connectivity were started in early 1943, resulting in the ideation, equipping, and successful testing of what would become the Double Sunrise service. Earlier in 1939 an alternative route via the Indian Ocean was proposed and designed by the Australian Government for potential use in case of emergency. The designed route was Port Hedland - Batavia - Christmas Island - Cocos Island - Diego Garcia - The Seychelles - Mombasa. This route was surveyed and tested in June 1939 but would ultimately not be used, in part as Batavia had already fallen in March 1942 in the Battle of Java (1942).

==== Innovation and resumption via "The Double Sunrise" (July 1943 – July 1945) ====
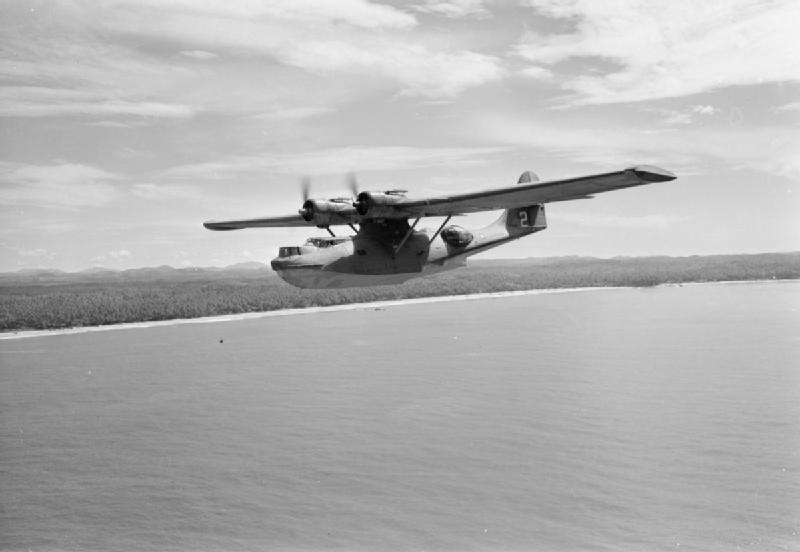
The QEA Catalina G-AGFL "Altair Star" flying along the coast of Ceylon at the conclusion of a 'Double Sunrise' flight from Australia which operated from July 1943-July 1945.

On 29 July 1943 Qantas resumed the kangaroo route's modified operation, using a fleet of 5 Consolidated PBY Catalina aircraft to cross the Indian ocean nonstop. The planned route was for flights between Crawley, Western Australia, and RAF Base Koggala in southern Ceylon. Designed to exploit the Catalina's extreme flight range, the flights became the longest non-stop commercial air route, covering over 3,500 nautical miles (6,500 kilometres; 4,000 miles) across the Indian Ocean. Navigated without the aid of radio, the crews relied solely on rudimentary navigation by compass and stars during the trip. Taking between 27 and 33 hours, with departure timed so that the flight crossed Japanese occupied territory during darkness, the crew and passengers would observe the sunrise twice, which led to the service being known as "The Double Sunrise". The Double Sunrise flights remain the longest (in terms of airtime) commercial flights in history.

Initially, passengers and mail were then transferred via ground transport from Galle to Karachi connecting with BOAC service onwards to London. In November 1943, this was replaced by adding an additional hop to the kangaroo route operated by the Qantas Catalinas up the Indian coast to Karangi Creek in Karachi.

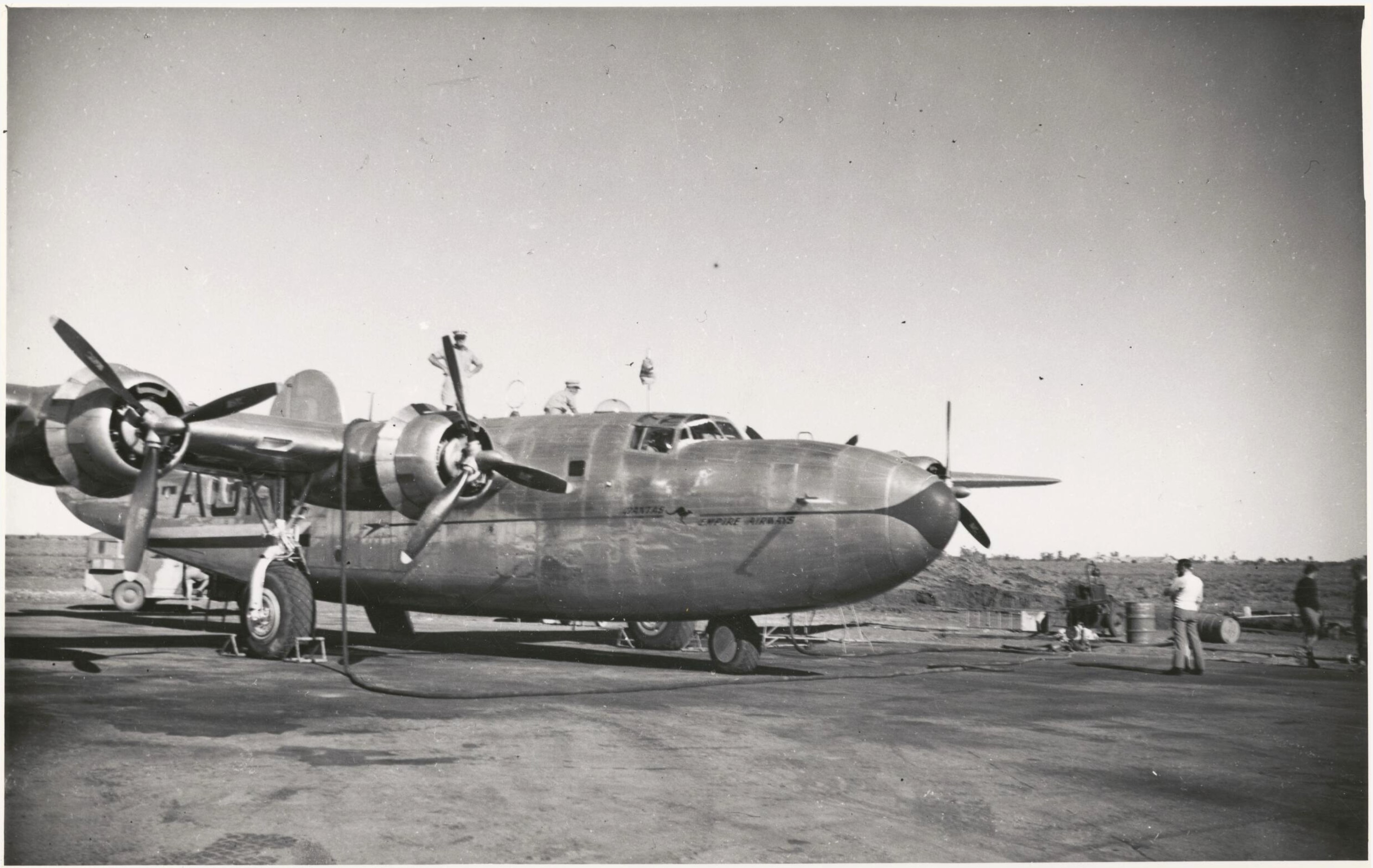
The first QEA Liberator G-AGKT refuelling at Learmonth Airport prior to departing for Colombo in 1945. This was the first plane to have the new Qantas Kangaroo logo applied to it (below cockpit window).

In June 1944, Qantas augmented the Kangaroo Route's Catalina service with an additional route operated by converted Consolidated Liberator bombers. The Liberators flew from Perth to Learmonth before flying a shorter 3,077 mi (4,952 km) over-water route to an airfield northeast of Colombo, but they could make the journey in 17 hours with 5,500 pounds (2,500 kg) of payload, whereas the Catalinas usually required at least 27 hours and their payload was limited to only 1,000 pounds (450 kg). This route was named "The Kangaroo Service" and was the genesis for the Kangaroo Route's naming. It also marked the first time that Qantas's now-famous Kangaroo logo was used; passengers received a certificate proclaiming them as members of "The Order of the Longest Hop".

In June 1945, Avro Lancastrians were introduced on the England–Australia service, and the Liberators and Catalinas were soon shifted to other Qantas routes. The Catalina-operated Double Sunrise service ended on 18 July 1945.

===== Route normalization - Western legs (May 1945) =====
On 30 May 1945, following the end of the war in the European Theatre, Lancastrian operated flights by BOAC resumed from Hurn Airport in southern England, connecting in Karachi to Qantas' operated service which flew via Karachi - Minneriya (Ceylon) - Learmonth to Sydney, covering the Kangaroo Route in a scheduled time of 70 hours.

===== Route normalization - Eastern legs (April 1946) =====
On 7 April 1946 - Qantas ended its Indian Ocean Service, and reverted the Kangaroo Route back via Darwin and Singapore. For the first time flying directly from Sydney to Darwin to Singapore, eliminating all previous domestic Australian stops. BOAC and Qantas service combined to operate the Kangaroo Route from Sydney to London time in a new record of 63 hours.

=== Multiple stops (1947–1974) ===
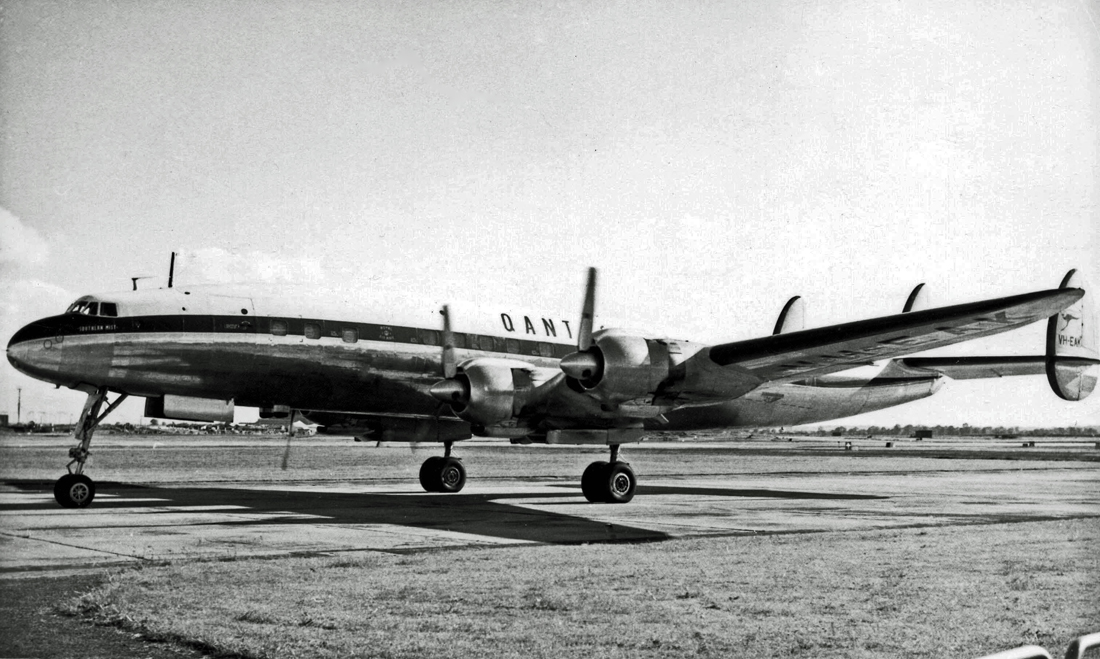
The Qantas Super Constellation "Southern Mist" landing at Heathrow Airport in 1955 after operating the Kangaroo route in 9 hops.

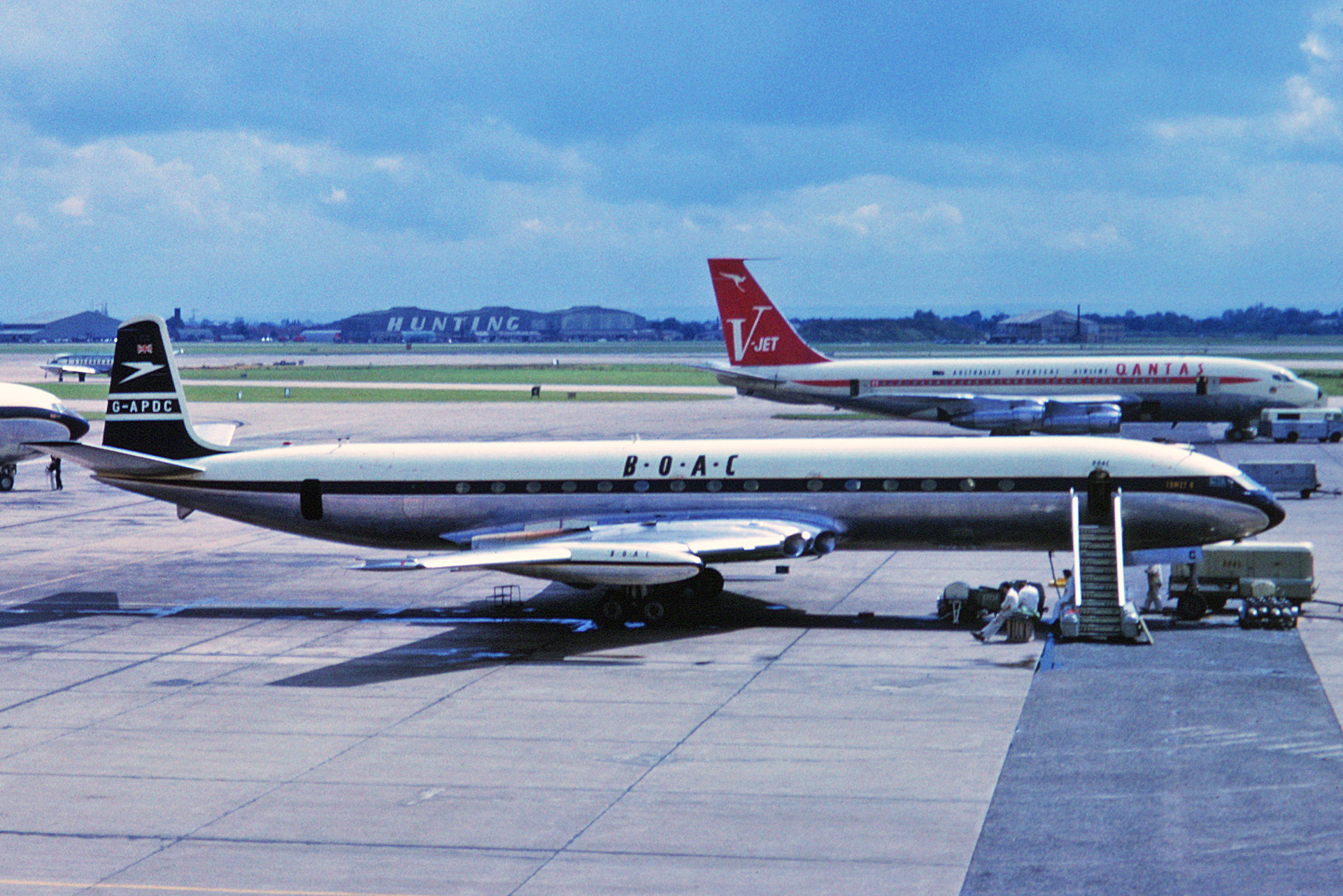
A Qantas Boeing 707 behind a De Havilland Comet of British Overseas Airways Corporation at Heathrow in 1963

In 1947, Qantas took over complete operation of the route from Australia to The United Kingdom utilizing their new Lockheed Constellations. BOAC would continue to run its own service in parallel. Qantas first flew the Kangaroo Route on 1 December 1947. A Lockheed Constellation carried 29 passengers and 11 crew from Sydney to London with stops in Darwin, Singapore, Calcutta, Karachi, Cairo, and Tripoli (passengers stayed overnight in Singapore and Cairo). A return fare was £585 (equivalent to $89,400 in 2022), equivalent to 130 weeks average pay.

In the 1950s and 1960s some Qantas Kangaroo Routes featured other stops, including Frankfurt, Zürich, Rome, Athens, Beirut, Tehran, Bombay, and Colombo. In May 1958 the Kangaroo Route had 11 westward flights a week: four Qantas Super Constellations, four BOAC Britannias, one Air India Super Constellation from Sydney to London, one KLM Super Constellation Sydney to Amsterdam, and one TAI Douglas DC-6B Auckland to Paris. In February 1959 Qantas' fastest Super Constellation took 63 hr 45 min Sydney to Heathrow and BOAC's Britannia took 49 hr 25 min. Jet flights (Qantas with Boeing 707) started in 1959; in April 1960 the fastest trip from Sydney to London was 34 hr 30 min with eight stops.

In the late 1950s, Qantas had a round-the-world network, flying Australia to Europe westward on the Kangaroo Route and eastward on the Southern Cross Route (via the Pacific Ocean). In 1964 Qantas started a third route to London via Tahiti, Mexico, and the Caribbean, called the Fiesta Route. Qantas dropped its Southern Cross Route and Fiesta Route in 1975. By 1969, Qantas had 11 Kangaroo Route flights a week from Sydney to London, taking 29–32 hours with 5–6 stops each; BOAC's 7-9 weekly flights previously had 7 stops.

In 1971 Qantas added Boeing 747s, reducing the travel time and number of stops (in the late 1970s flights typically stopped at Singapore and Bahrain). Fares fell, opening air travel to more people with more competition.

=== One-stop flights (1974–2018) ===
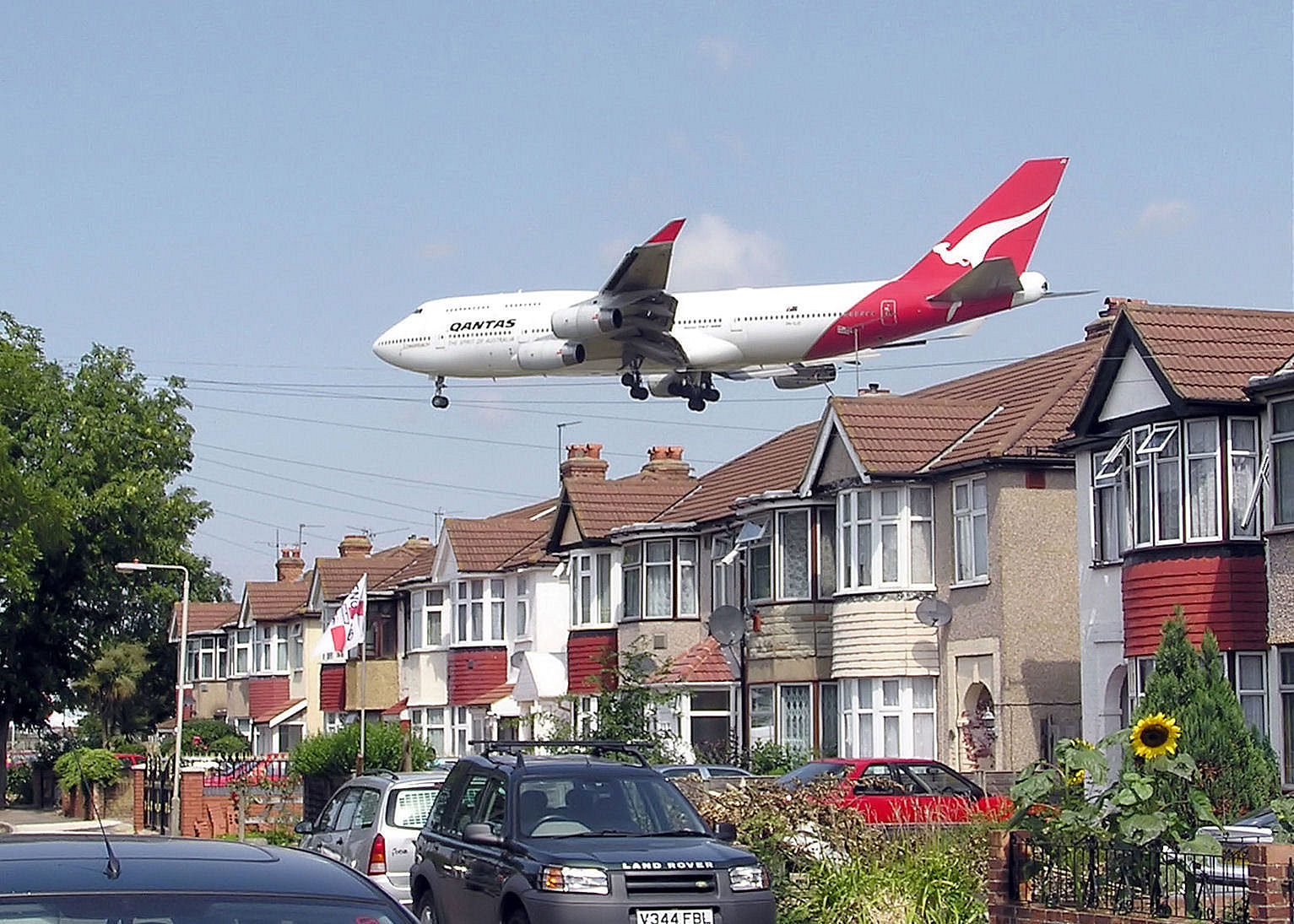
A Qantas Boeing 747-400 overflying Myrtle Avenue, Hounslow on final approach to Heathrow

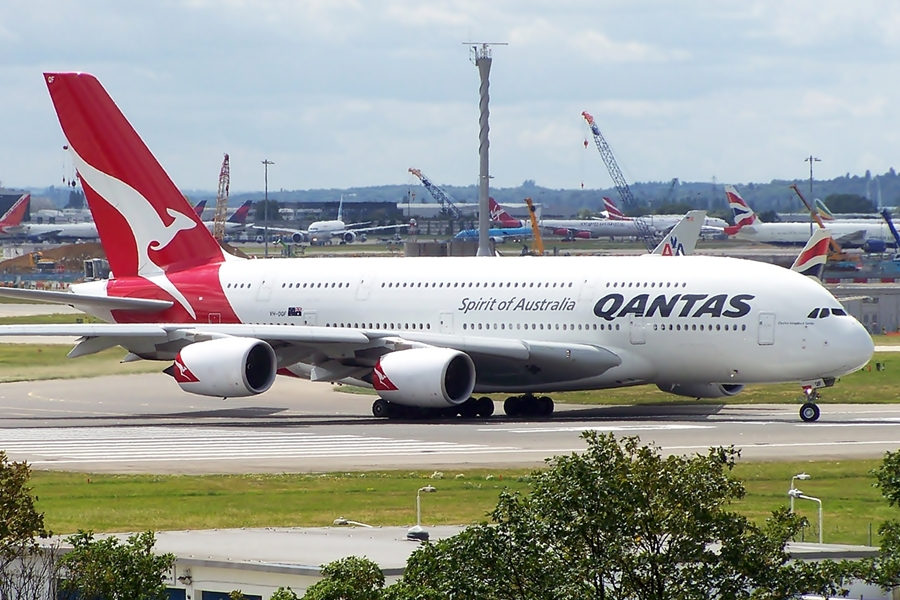
A Qantas Airbus A380 at Heathrow

On 29 March 1974, Qantas commenced operating a one stop service from Perth to London with only one stop in Bombay with Boeing 707s and later supplemented with Boeing 747-200s in June of that same year. In October 1988 Qantas introduced a one stop service from Sydney to London with Boeing 747-300s.

In 1989 Qantas set a world distance record for commercial jets when a Boeing 747-400, the City of Canberra, flew non-stop from London to Sydney in just over 20 hours (with special fuel and without passengers or cargo). This was the only nonstop flight ever made between both cities for the next 3 decades.

Starting in January 2009, Qantas began utilising its new A380 aircraft on the Kangaroo Route, raising its capacity to 450 passengers per flight.

As part of a partnership approved in 2013 with Emirates, Qantas announced that its services to London would stop in Dubai rather than Singapore, beginning that same year. Qantas also announced that its services to Frankfurt via Singapore would be discontinued in April 2013, leaving London as its only European destination. In 2017, Qantas announced a renewal of this partnership for another 5 years with the modification of the Qantas' Kangaroo Route reverting to operating with a stopover in Singapore instead of Dubai from 25 March 2018.

=== Non-stop flights (2018–present) ===
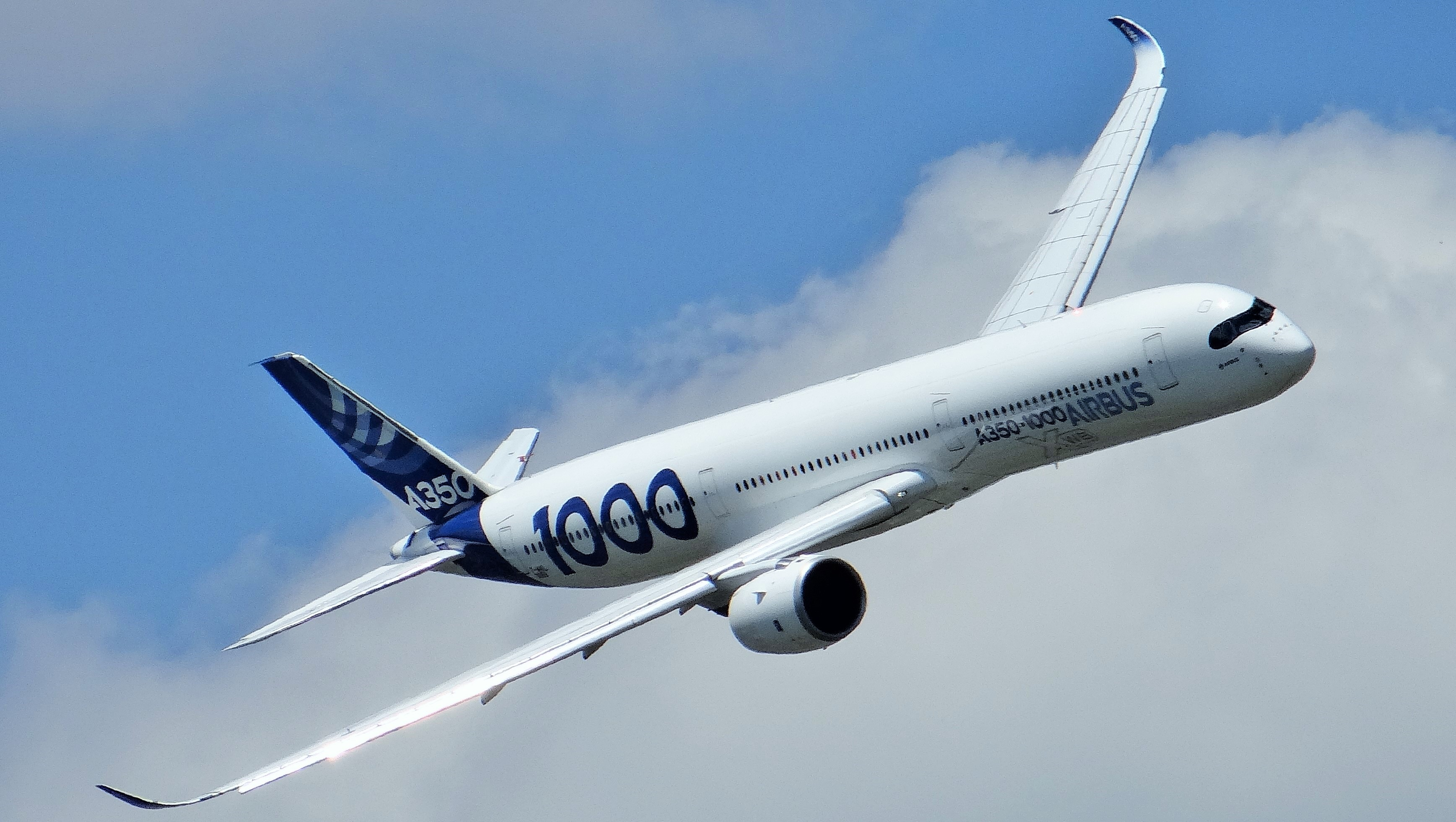
Qantas selected the Airbus A350-1000ULR for non-stop flights

Non-stop flights from Perth to London commenced in March 2018 with Boeing 787s, with the Kangaroo route becoming a non-stop route for the first time, while also connecting Australia and Europe via a non-stop route for the first time. These flights operate out of Perth's Terminal 3 rather than the traditional T1 in order to facilitate seamless transfers from Qantas domestic flights. The route also opened up the possibility of further non-stop flights to Europe from Perth such as Rome (launched June 2022) and Paris (launched July 2024).

In late March 2020, prior to Qantas cutting all international services due to the COVID-19 pandemic, several repatriation flights were operated with a routing of Sydney-Darwin-London. The Singaporean government had banned transit passengers and airspace in the Middle East was closed, due to the pandemic. This was the first time an Airbus A380 flew nonstop between Australia and Europe.

In November 2021, Qantas resumed non-stop Kangaroo Route flights, this time from Darwin to London before resuming the non-stop route between Perth and London in May 2022 following the reopening of Western Australia for international travel.

=== Project Sunrise (2027 onwards) ===
Qantas plans to commence non-stop operations using Airbus A350-1000ULR aircraft to connect Sydney directly to London and New York in late 2027. This will accompany rather than replace Qantas' existing non-stop Perth–London and one-stop Sydney–London services.

== Qantas' evolution of the Kangaroo Route ==
Since its founding in 1935, Qantas has evolved the Kangaroo Route over time in terms of "hops" (routings), duration, and aircraft used. Illustrated in the below table are snapshots of that ongoing evolution over the years.

Year	Number of stops	Total duration^{note}	Route (From-via-To)	Aircraft and operator	Passengers
1935	38	12.5 days	Brisbane Stops 1-17 operated by Qantas Empire Airways: 1. Roma; 2. Charleville; 3. Blackall; 4. Longreach; 5. Winton; 6. Cloncurry; 7. Mt. Isa; 8. Camooweal; 9. Brunette Downs; 10. Newcastle Waters; 11. Daly Waters; 12. Darwin; 13. Koepang (Kupang, Indonesia); 14. Rambang (Lombok, Indonesia); 15. Sourabaya (Surabaya, Indonesia); 16. Batavia (Jakarta, Indonesia); 17. Singapore; Stops 18-27 operated by Indian Trans-Continental Airways: 18. Alor Setar, Kedah (Malaysia); 19. Bangkok; 20. Rangoon (Yangon); 21. Akyab (Sittwe); 22. Calcutta (Kolkata); 23. Allahabad; 24. Cawnpore (Kanpur); 25. Delhi; 26. Jodhpur; 27. Karachi; Stops 28-38 operated by Imperial Airways: 28. Gwadar; 29. Sharjah (Sharjah, UAE); 30. Bahrain; 31. Kowait; 32. Basra; 33. Baghdad; 34. Gaza, Palestine (Tel Aviv, Israel); 35. Alexandria; 36. Athens; 37. Brindisi; 38. Paris via Train; Croydon (then train to London)	De Havilland 86 (Qantas Empire Airways); Armstrong Whitworth Atalanta (Indian Trans-continental Airways); Handley Page H.P.42 "Hannibal" (Imperial Airways); Handley Page H.P.45 "Heracles" (Imperial Airways)	9
1937	40	12 days	Brisbane Stops 1-17 operated by Qantas Empire Airways: 1. Roma; 2. Charleville; 3. Blackall; 4. Longreach; 5. Winton; 6. Cloncurry; 7. Mt. Isa; 8. Camooweal; 9. Avon Downs; 10. Newcastle Waters; 11. Daly Waters; 12. Darwin; 13. Koepang (Kupang, Indonesia); 14. Rambang (Lombok, Indonesia); 15. Sourabaya (Surabaya, Indonesia); 16. Batavia (Jakarta, Indonesia); 17. Singapore; Stops 18-27 operated by Indian Trans-Continental Airways: 18. Penang; 19. Bangkok; 20. Rangoon (Yangon); 21. Akyab (Sittwe); 22. Calcutta (Kolkata); 23. Allahabad; 24. Cawnpore (Kanpur); 25. Delhi; 26. Jodhpur; 27. Karachi; Stops 28-40 operated by Imperial Airways: 28. Gwadar; 29. Sharjah (Sharjah, UAE); 30. Bahrain; 31. Kuwait; 32. Basra; 33. Baghdad; 34. Gaza, Palestine (Tel Aviv, Israel); 35. Alexandria; 36. Athens; 37. Brindisi; 38. Rome; 39. Marseilles; 40. Macon; Southampton, England (then train to London)	De Havilland 86 (Qantas Empire Airways); Armstrong Whitworth Atalanta (Indian Trans-continental Airways); Handley Page H.P.42 "Hannibal" (Imperial Airways); Handley Page H.P.45 "Heracles" (Imperial Airways)	9
1938	35	9 days 20 hours	Sydney Stops 1-12 operated by Qantas Empire Airways: 1. Brisbane; 2. Gladstone; 3. Townsville; 4. Karumba; 5. Groote Eylandt; 6. Darwin; 7. Koepang (Kupang, Indonesia); 8. Bima (Bima, Indonesia); 9. Sourabaya (Surabaya, Indonesia); 10. Batavia (Jakarta, Indonesia); 11. Klabat Bay (Belinyu, Indonesia); 12. Singapore; Stops 13-35 operated by Imperial Airways: 13. Penang; 14. Koh Samui; 15. Bangkok; 16. Rangoon (Yangon); 17. Akyab (Sittwe); 18. Calcutta (Kolkata); 19. Allahabad; 20. Gwalior; 21. Rajsamand; 22. Karachi; 23. Gwadar; 24. Dubai (Dubai, UAE); 25. Bahrain; 26. Basra; 27. Habbaniyeh; 28. Tiberias, Palestine (Tiberias, Israel); 29. Alexandria; 30. Mirabello; 31. Athens; 32. Brindisi; 33. Rome; 34. Marseilles; 35. St. Nazaire; Southampton, England (then train to London)	Short S23 'C' Class Empire flying boat (Qantas Empire Airways); Short S23 'C' Class Empire flying boat (Imperial Airways)	15
1947	6	3 days 20 hours	Sydney: 1. Darwin; 2. Singapore; 3. Calcutta (Kolkata); 4. Karachi; 5. Cairo; 6. Tripoli; London	Lockheed Constellation	29
1955	8	3 days 6 hours	Sydney: 1. Darwin; 2. Jakarta; 3. Singapore; 4. Bangkok; 5. Calcutta (Kolkata); 6. Karachi; 7. Cairo; 8. Rome; London	Lockheed L-1049 Super Constellation	57
1959	8	38 hours	Sydney: 1. Darwin; 2. Singapore; 3. Bangkok; 4. Calcutta (Kolkata); 5. Karachi; 6. Bahrain; 7. Cairo; 8. Rome; London	Boeing 707-138	120
1965	5	30 hours	Sydney: 1. Singapore; 2. Calcutta (Kolkata); 3. Karachi; 4. Cairo; 5. Rome; London	Boeing 707-320	220
1971	2	26 hours	Sydney: 1. Singapore; 2. Bahrain; London	Boeing 747-200B	356
1977	1	23 hours	Perth: 1. Bombay (Mumbai); London	Boeing 747-200B	436
1990	1	24 hours	Sydney: 1. Singapore; London	Boeing 747-400	412
2013	1	23 hours 30 min	Sydney: 1. Dubai (aka ˈThe Falcon Routeˈ); London	Airbus A380-800	484
2018	0	17 hours 20 min	Perth London	Boeing 787-9	236
2027	0	20 hours (estimated)	Sydney London	Airbus A350-1000ULR	238

Note: Duration is total elapsed travel time westbound (including stops)

== Competing one-stop flights ==
While "The Kangaroo Route" is a trademarked term belonging to Qantas, it is often genericized by the media, other operators and even Qantas themselves to refer to all flights between Australia and the United Kingdom. Today Qantas remains the sole operator of "The Kangaroo Route" as well as the only nonstop flight between Australia and the United Kingdom. British Airways continues to operate its legacy route it has served since 1935 when it was Imperial Airways, offering the only other direct flight from Australia to the United Kingdom.

Forming a competitive market, there are over 25 airlines operating competing one-stop flights from Australia to the United Kingdom via the Eastern Hemisphere. Qantas destinations exclude any origins served by the airline's regional subsidiary, QantasLink.

Competing one-stop Australia-United Kingdom flights(sorted by transiting country)
(Australia) Origin	Airline	Transit	(United Kingdom) Destination
Melbourne, Sydney	Air China	(China) Beijing–Capital	Gatwick, Heathrow
Adelaide, Brisbane, Melbourne, Sydney	China Eastern	(China) Shanghai–Pudong	Gatwick, Heathrow
Adelaide, Brisbane, Darwin, Melbourne, Perth, Sydney	China Southern	(China) Guangzhou	Gatwick, Heathrow
Melbourne, Sydney	Hainan Airlines	(China) Haikou	Heathrow (Note: Routes operates with stopover in Changsha, as flight number HU7963/4. The same aircraft is used.)
Melbourne, Sydney	Juneyao Air	(China) Shanghai–Pudong	Manchester
Melbourne	Shenzhen Airlines	(China) Shenzhen	Heathrow
Sydney	Tianjin Airlines	(China) Chongqing	Heathrow
Melbourne, Sydney	XiamenAir	(China) Xiamen	Heathrow
Adelaide, Brisbane, Cairns, Melbourne, Perth, Sydney	Cathay Pacific	Hong Kong	Heathrow, Manchester
Melbourne (Note: Routes operates with stopover in Bangkok Suvarnabhumi, as flight number AY145/6. The same aircraft is used.)	Finnair	(Finland) Helsinki	Edinburgh, Heathrow, Manchester
Melbourne, Sydney	Air India	(India) New Delhi	Birmingham, Heathrow
Sydney	All Nippon Airways	(Japan) Tokyo–Haneda	Heathrow
Sydney	Japan Airlines	(Japan) Tokyo–Haneda	Heathrow
Adelaide, Brisbane, Melbourne, Perth, Sydney	Malaysia Airlines	(Malaysia) Kuala Lumpur	Heathrow
Perth	Air Mauritius	(Mauritius) Port Louis	Gatwick
Adelaide, Brisbane, Canberra, (Note: Operates with a stop in Melbourne as flights QR988/9.) Melbourne, Perth, Sydney	Qatar Airways	(Qatar) Doha	Birmingham, Edinburgh, Gatwick, Heathrow, Manchester
Perth, Sydney (Note: Scheduled to begin October 2027.)	Qantas	Non-Stop	Heathrow
Adelaide, Alice Springs, Ayers Rock, Brisbane, Broome, Cairns, Darwin, Gold Coast, Hamilton Island, Hobart, Melbourne, Norfolk Island, Perth, Sunshine Coast	Qantas	(Australia) Sydney (Note: Scheduled to begin October 2027.)	Heathrow
Adelaide, Brisbane, Broome, Canberra, Darwin, Hobart, Kalgoorlie, Karratha, Melbourne, Newcastle, Newman, Port Hedland, Sydney	Qantas	(Australia) Perth	Heathrow
Brisbane, Darwin, Melbourne, Perth, Sydney	Qantas	Singapore	Heathrow
Melbourne (Note: Resumes January 11, 2027.)	British Airways	(Malaysia) Kuala Lumpur	Heathrow
Sydney	British Airways	Singapore	Heathrow
Adelaide, Brisbane, Cairns, Darwin, Melbourne, Perth, Sydney	Singapore Airlines	Singapore	Gatwick, Heathrow, Manchester
Melbourne, Sydney	Asiana Airlines	(South Korea) Seoul–Incheon	Heathrow
Brisbane, Sydney	Korean Air	(South Korea) Seoul–Incheon	Heathrow
Melbourne, Sydney	SriLankan Airlines	(Sri Lanka) Colombo	Heathrow
Brisbane, (Note: Routes to Brisbane continue to Auckland, New Zealand as flights CI53/4) Melbourne, Sydney	China Airlines	(Taiwan) Taipei–Taoyuan	Heathrow
Perth, Melbourne, Sydney	Thai Airways	(Thailand) Bangkok–Suvarnabhumi	Heathrow
Melbourne (Note: Route operates with stopover in Singapore, as flight number TK168/9. The same aircraft is used.), Sydney (Note: Route operates with stopover in Singapore, as flight number TK22/23. The same aircraft is used.)	Turkish Airlines	(Turkey) Istanbul	Birmingham, Edinburgh, Gatwick, Heathrow, Manchester, Stansted
Melbourne, Sydney	Etihad Airways	(United Arab Emirates) Abu Dhabi	Heathrow, Manchester
Adelaide, Brisbane, Melbourne, Perth, Sydney	Emirates	(United Arab Emirates) Dubai	Birmingham, Edinburgh, Gatwick, Glasgow, Heathrow, Manchester, Newcastle, Stansted
Melbourne, Sydney	Vietnam Airlines	(Vietnam) Hanoi	Heathrow
Melbourne, Perth, Sydney	Vietnam Airlines	(Vietnam) Ho Chi Minh City	Heathrow

== In literature ==
The book Beyond the Blue Horizon by travel correspondent Alexander Frater documents the author's attempt to fly all the sectors on the original 1935 Imperial/Qantas London-Brisbane route in 1984.

== See also ==
- Southern Cross Route – the Kangaroo Route's counterpart traveling via the Western Hemisphere
- Wallaby Route - Route launched by Qantas in 1952 connecting Sydney to Johannesburg
- Project Sunrise - Qantas' initiative to launch non-stop flights from Sydney to London and New York City in 2027
