= Wallaby Route =

Air route between Australia and South Africa

The Wallaby Route or "Wallaby Service" is a term coined by Qantas referring to the commercial passenger air route between Australia and South Africa.

First flown in 1948, its name was inspired by the route's short ‘hops’ used to cover the long distance, similar to the hops of the wallaby; a marsupial largely endemic to, and culturally associated, with Australia. The name "Wallaby Route" for their new Australia-South Africa service was chosen by Qantas Empire Airways after considering hundreds of suggested titles. The chosen name of "Wallaby" was suggested by Major-General Christoffel 'Boetie' Venter, then manager of South African Airways. The name choice was also to indicate its relationship to Qantas' famous "Kangaroo Route" connecting Australia and the United Kingdom.

== The first Wallaby Route flight ==
Qantas Empire Airways first flew the Wallaby Route to South Africa on 14 November 1948 with a survey flight operated with an Avro Lancastrian from Sydney via Melbourne, Perth, Cocos (Keeling) Islands, and Mauritius to Johannesburg. Connecting the two continents with direct commercial air flight for the first time. The initial survey flight took a total of 41 hours and 52 minutes of flying time done over seven days of November 14–20. Combining a 10-hour 21 minute flight from Sydney to Perth, an 8-hour 5 minute flight to the Cocos Islands, a 12-hour 8 minute flight to Mauritius, and a final 9 hour 40 minute flight to Johannesburg. The return eastbound route included an additional stop at Réunion due to the fuel & weight restrictions from the high altitude of Johannesburg.

== Evolution of the Wallaby Route ==
=== 6 Hop Era (1952-1957) ===
- On 1 September 1952, the first scheduled passenger service left Sydney for Johannesburg. Qantas carried 27 passengers on the inaugural flight, utilising their popular Lockheed Constellation L-749A aircraft that had proven to be a great success in their replacement of the Lancastrians on the Kangaroo Route. The westbound Wallaby route 'hopped' from Sydney, to Perth, the Cocos (Keeling) Islands, Mauritius, and arrived in Johannesburg approximately 2 days and 18 hours later.
- In 1955, Qantas replaced the aircraft with its Super Constellation L-1049 and replaced the Melbourne stop with a stop in Darwin, resulting in a reduction in the route's travel time to 30 hours.

=== 5 Hop Era (1957-1967) ===
- In 1957, Qantas and South African Airways (SAA) announced a partnership to operate the Wallaby Route on alternating weeks, SAA with its Douglas DC-7 aircraft and Qantas with its Super Constellations. With the powerful DC-7B's extra range, SAA could skip Réunion completely. The remaining difference was SAA's service terminated in Perth where Qantas' continued on to Sydney via Melbourne.
- in 1963 Qantas introduced its Lockheed L-188 Electra aircraft to the route, reducing the flight time to around 26 hours 30 minutes. The April 19, 1963 eastbound Wallaby Route flight was noteworthy as it was the last ever passenger flight of Qantas' Super Constellations.

=== 3 Hop Era (1967-1982) ===
- In March 1967, with Perth Airport's runway extension now completed and capable of handling jet aircraft, both Qantas and SAA replaced their respective Lockheed Electras and DC-7Bs with their new Boeing 707. With the jets' superior range, the Melbourne and Cocos Islands stops were eliminated from the Wallaby Route reducing the Sydney-Johannesburg connection to only 2 stops, Perth and Mauritius, and a reduced flight time of approximately 18 hours.
- From 1976 to 1982 Qantas suspended all operations between Australia and South Africa. During this time SAA continued to operate, introducing their Boeing 747SPs on the route in 1977 before changing over to the larger Boeing 747-200s.

=== 2 Hop Era (1982-2001) ===
- On November 14, 1982 Qantas restored service on the Wallaby route to Zimbabwe (Harare) using its new 747SP aircraft with Johannesburg direct services (re)added later. Reducing the Wallaby Route (to Harare) to 1 stop (Perth).
- On October 27, 1987, SAA ended its Wallaby Route service, eventually restarting in January 1992 after the demise of apartheid using a 747-200.

=== 1 Hop (Nonstop) Era ===
- In January 2001, Qantas started nonstop flights between Sydney and Johannesburg using their 747-400 aircraft with an average flight time of 14 hours 10 minutes.
- In 2003, SAA changed their Wallaby Route service to their new A340-200s but remained a 2 hop route via Perth. In 2020, SAA ceased Wallaby Route service operations as part of the impact of its bankruptcy.
- From 2020 to 2024, Qantas was the sole operator of the Wallaby Route using a Boeing 787-9 to connect Sydney and Johannesburg nonstop in 14 hours 30 minutes.
- On 28 April 2024, SAA resumed its Wallaby Route service, relaunching its nonstop route between Johannesburg and Perth.
- On 30 September 2024, Qantas converted its Wallaby Route operations between Sydney and Johannesburg to all A380s.

== Competing two hop (one-stop) routes ==
Qantas is the originator of the route and its creative "Wallaby Route" name, as well as continuing to operate the most frequent services. As of January 2026, Qantas operates a total of 9 weekly non-stop flights (6 from Sydney and 3 from Perth). While South African Airways operates 5 weekly from Johannesburg.

Excluding flights connecting via Europe or the Americas; there are a total of eight airlines competing in the one-stop Australia-South Africa air market, with two of those connecting through East Asia and three through the Middle East. Only three airlines: Air Mauritius, Qantas and South African Airways operate the "traditional" routing over the Indian Ocean, of which the latter two operate non-stop.

Competing one-stop Australia-South Africa flights (sorted by transiting country)
(Australia) Origin	Airline	Transit	(South Africa) Destination
Perth, Sydney	Qantas	Non-Stop	Johannesburg
Perth	South African Airways	Non-Stop	Johannesburg
Adelaide, Brisbane, Cairns, Melbourne, Perth, Sydney	Cathay Pacific	Hong Kong	Johannesburg
Perth	Air Mauritius	(Mauritius) Port Louis	Cape Town, Johannesburg
Adelaide, Brisbane, Canberra, (Note: Operates with a stop in Melbourne as flights QR988/9.) Melbourne, Perth, Sydney	Qatar Airways	(Qatar) Doha	Cape Town, Durban, (Note: Operates with a stop in Maputo as flights QR1375/6) Johannesburg
Adelaide, Brisbane, Cairns, Darwin, Melbourne, Perth, Sydney	Singapore Airlines	Singapore	Cape Town, (Note: Operates with a stop in Johannesburg as flights SQ478/9) Johannesburg
Melbourne, Sydney	Etihad Airways	(United Arab Emirates) Abu Dhabi	Johannesburg
Adelaide, Brisbane, Melbourne, Perth, Sydney	Emirates	(United Arab Emirates) Dubai	Cape Town, Durban, Johannesburg

== See also ==
- Kangaroo Route
- Southern Cross Route
- Fiesta Route - Qantas' route that existed from 1964 to 1975 connecting Sydney to London via Fiji, Tahiti, Acapulco, Mexico City, The Bahamas, and Bermuda.
