= The Double Sunrise =

Airline service

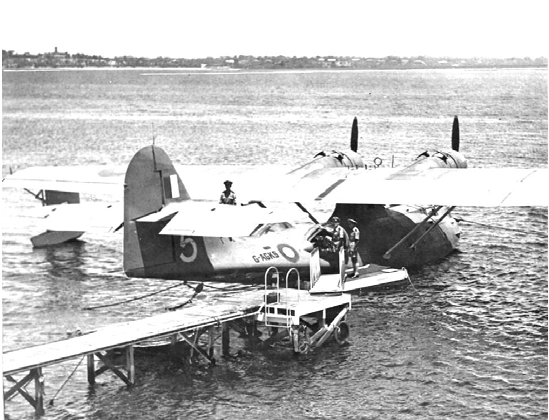
Double Sunrise Catalina G-AGKS at Nedlands in 1943

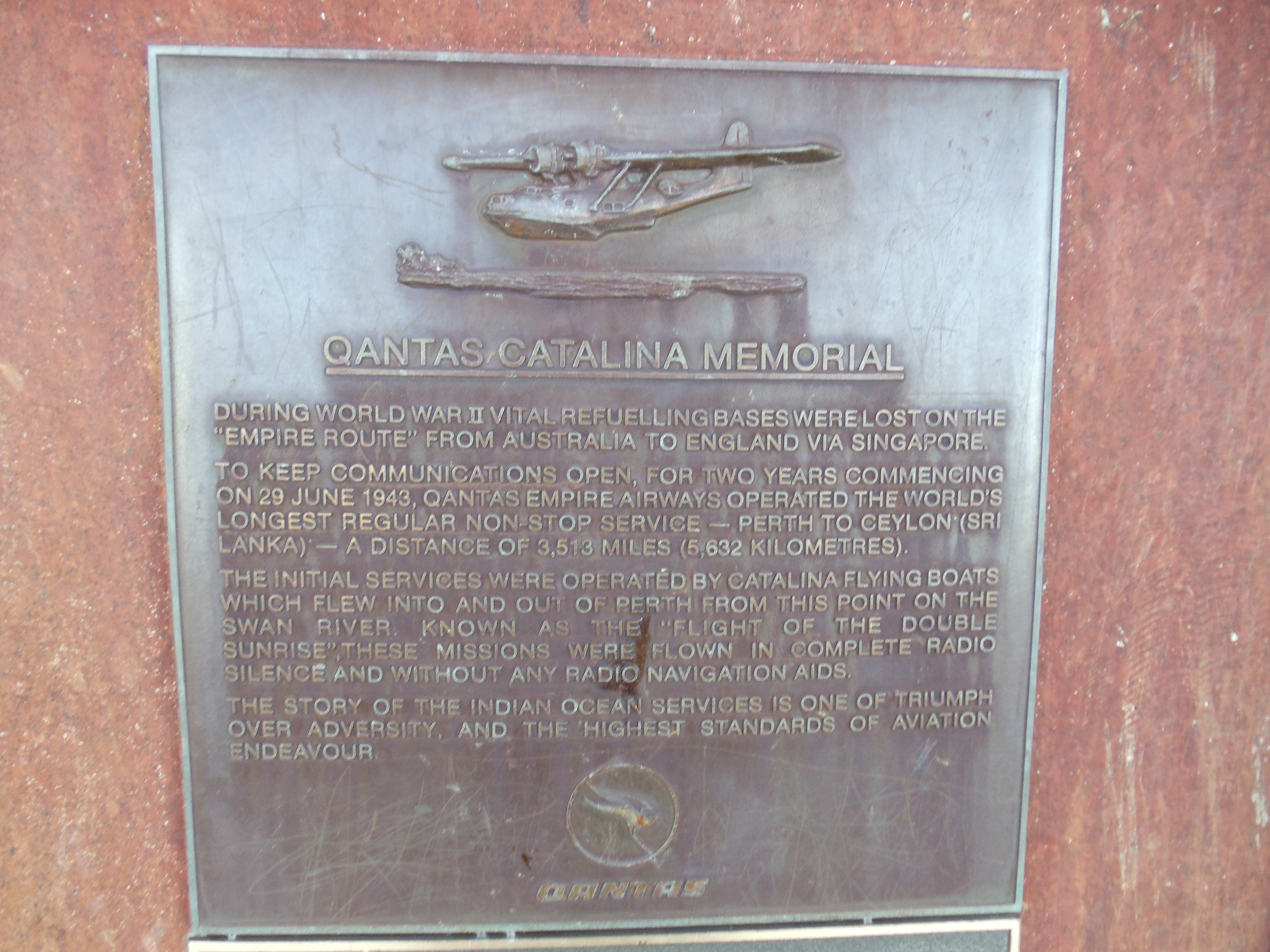
The Qantas Catalina Memorial in Crawley, Western Australia

The Double Sunrise service was formed in July 1943 to re-establish the Australia–England air link that had been cut due to the fall of Singapore in February 1942. The service initially operated from its base in Nedlands, Western Australia near Perth, to the Royal Air Force base at Lake Koggala near Galle in Ceylon (now Sri Lanka). It was later extended to Karachi in British India (now part of Pakistan), which was the terminus for the BOAC service from England. The name of the service was derived from the crew and passengers observing two sunrises on the westbound flight from Australia. With a single flight taking between 27 and 33 hours, it was and remains the longest (by time aloft) commercial flight in history.

== Background ==
The commercial aviation link between Australia and the United Kingdom was established in 1934 (later to be coined "The Kangaroo Route"). In June 1940, it was interrupted when access to the direct commercial air routes across the Mediterranean were lost due to Italy entering the war. The resulting wartime "Horseshoe Route" that connected Australia and England for airmail (via Africa) then started its operation in the same month and ran until its final reserve route ("Reserve Route 3") connecting Australia via Broome was lost on 15 February 1942 with the fall of Singapore. Plans for restoration of the connectivity were started in early 1943, resulting in the ideation, equipping, and successful testing of what would become the Double Sunrise service.

Earlier in 1939 an alternative route via the Indian Ocean was proposed and designed by the Australian Government for potential use in case of emergency. The designed route was Port Hedland – Batavia – Christmas Island – Cocos Island – Diego Garcia – The Seychelles – Mombasa. This route was surveyed and tested in June of 1939 but would ultimately not be used as Batavia had already fallen in March 1942 in the Battle of Java (1942). Direct airmail connectivity to Africa would eventually be restored via the Double Sunrise service connecting to BOAC's service from Koggala via the Seychelles to Mombasa in November 1944.

== History ==
In 1943, Royal Australian Air Force personnel were seconded to operate Consolidated PBY Catalina seaplane aircraft under the banner of Qantas. The plan called for flights between Crawley, Western Australia, and RAF Base Koggala in southern Ceylon. The flights were (then) the longest non-stop air route of any airline, over 3,500 nautical miles (6,500 kilometres; 4,000 miles) across the Indian Ocean. Navigating without the aid of radio, the crews relied solely on rudimentary navigation by compass and stars during the trip. Five aircraft obtained under Lend-Lease were supplied by the British Air Ministry, and were named after stars used for navigation en route: Rigel Star, Spica Star, Altair Star, Vega Star and Antares Star. The first flight took place on 29 July 1943.

Taking between 27 and 33 hours, with departure timed so that the flight crossed Japanese occupied territory during darkness, the crews would observe the sunrise twice, which led to the service being known as "The Double Sunrise". The flight route flown was along the coast from Crawley to Exmouth then setting out towards Cocos (Keeling) Island or Christmas Island (though neither was actually sighted during the flight^{1}) and onto Galle, a journey of approximately 3,580 nautical miles (6,630 km; 4,120 mi). After the success of the initial flights, it was decided to run a weekly service, with some services flying over Rottnest Island and then taking a direct line to Galle. As part of the Australia-England air route there was a surface component from Galle to Karachi that added considerable time to the service. This was later replaced by the Double Sunrise service, with Karachi to England flown by BOAC. Air crews would change in Galle taking the next plane in either direction minimizing the time taken to complete the journey.^{1}

Though stripped of all non-essential equipment, including de-icing equipment and insulation, the average takeoff weight was 35,100 to 35,300 lb (15,900 to 16,000 kg) (maximum takeoff weight for a PBY Catalina was 35,400 lb (16,100 kg)); this included 1,988 imperial gallons (9,040 L) of fuel, which gave the Catalina a range of 3,600 nautical miles (6,700 km; 4,100 mi). The service made 271 crossings, delivered over 10,000 lb (4,500 kg) of mail and carried 860 passengers, including among them British MP Edith Summerskill and the journalist Keith Murdoch.^{2} Due to the weight of the auxiliary fuel, an average flight carried only 3 passengers and 152 pounds (69 kg) of essential mail.

Starting in June 1944, Qantas augmented the Catalinas with the first of two converted Consolidated Liberator bombers. The Liberators flew a shorter 3,077 mi (4,952 km) over-water route from Learmonth to an airfield northeast of Colombo, but they could make the journey in 17 hours with 5,500 pounds (2,500 kg) of payload, whereas the Catalinas usually required at least 27 hours and their payload was limited to only 1,000 pounds (450 kg). The route was named Kangaroo Service and marked the first time that Qantas's now-famous Kangaroo logo was used; passengers received a certificate proclaiming them as members of The Order of the Longest Hop.

In June 1945, Avro Lancastrians were introduced on the England–Australia service, and the Liberators and Catalinas were soon shifted to other Qantas routes. Double Sunrise service ended on 18 July 1945. After the war, in accordance with the terms of the Lend-Lease agreement, the five modified Catalinas that had flown The Double Sunrise service were scuttled.

The Double Sunrise flights remain the longest (in terms of time aloft) commercial flights in history.

== Secret Order of the Double Sunrise ==
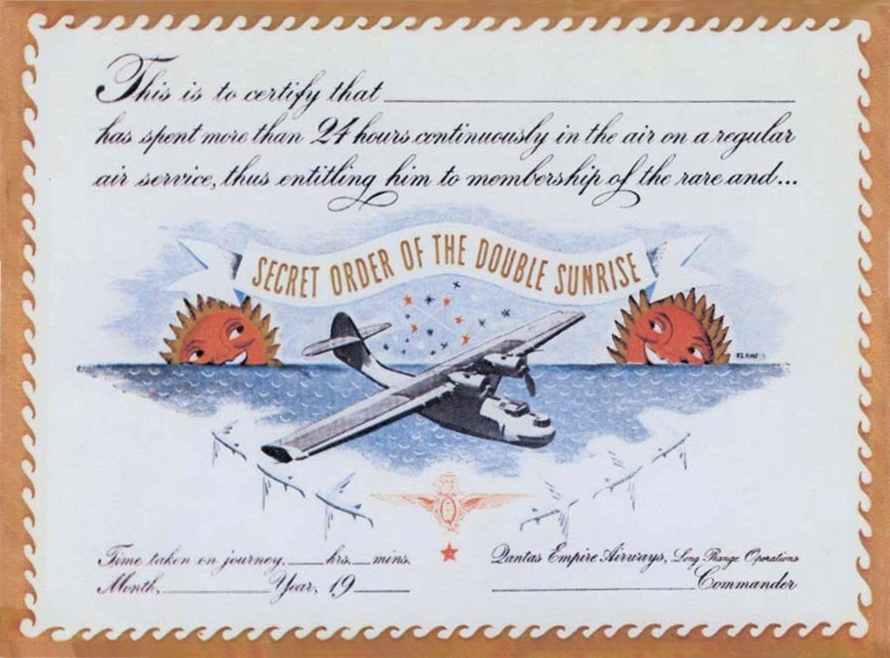
The Secret Order of the Double Sunrise certificate that was given by Qantas to all passengers on the Double Sunrise service

The Secret Order of the Double Sunrise was an illustrated certificate given to passengers aboard the flying boats of the Australia–England air link, to attest they had been airborne for more than 24 hours.

== Documentary film ==
In 2013, a documentary film was made to celebrate the 70th anniversary of the Double Sunrise flights. The film features 93-year-old Rex Senior who was the last remaining pilot. The film was released on Qantas Inflight globally and on DVD.

== See also ==
- Kangaroo Route
- Project Sunrise

== Notes ==
Rex Senior was the 1st Officer & Navigator on the first service, he was also on the crew for many of the subsequent flights, serving with the unit until march 1944.
1.^1 Flight information is from Rex Senior's recollections there is no reference to official documentation for verification.
