= Southern Cross Route =

Term for UK–Australia flights via the US

The Southern Cross Route is the name given to the commercial passenger air route connecting Australia and the United Kingdom via the United States. The term was coined by British Commonwealth Pacific Airlines in 1949 to refer to its new trans-pacific route from Australia to North America. The name was chosen by BCPA in honour of Sir Charles Kingsford Smith's historic 1928 flight in the aircraft Southern Cross.

In 1954, Qantas acquired BCPA and expanded the term's definition as it also expanded the route, even trademarking it for a number of years, as the official name of its air routes connecting Australia and the United Kingdom via the United States. Qantas would go on to pair up the Southern Cross route with its existing famous counterpart route the "Kangaroo Route" connecting Australia and the United Kingdom via the Eastern Hemisphere to form its newly titled "Round the World" service.

== Significant dates in the Southern Cross Route's evolution ==
- 14 February 1949: Initial operations (Australia to North America) – The term was coined by British Commonwealth Pacific Airlines (BCPA) when they were formed to begin the first commercial service from Sydney to Vancouver in February 1949.
- 15 May 1954: Multi-operator combined operations begin – Aftering acquiring BCPA on April 1st 1954, Qantas quickly put into service their own operating of the route connecting Australia and North America, launching their first operated flight of the Southern Cross Route on 15 May to San Francisco. British Overseas Airways Company (BOAC) retained its existing transatlantic operating rights and services from New York to London. BOAC subsequently sold connecting flights operated by domestic airlines from 1954 onwards, providing a multi-carrier operated route connecting Australia and the United Kingdom for the first time via North America.
- 14 January 1958: Qantas operates the entire route – Qantas' Southern Cross route operations were extended to the United Kingdom following the signing of an air services agreement between Australia and the United Kingdom in 1957. This extended commercial route was inaugurated on 14 January 1958 by Qantas using their Lockheed L-1049 Super Constellations.
- 1 April 1973: Qantas continued to operate the full route to London until 1 April 1973, when it discontinued the New York to London leg of the route, leaving partner airlines to operate this part of the route.
- 21 March 2020: Qantas suspends all international flights – Qantas suspended its entire Southern Cross service as Australia shut down all international flights in response to the COVID-19 pandemic.
- 14 June 2023: Qantas resumes flights to New York – Qantas relaunched flights to North America, this time swapping out the traditional stop in the west coast of the United States, with a stop in Auckland, New Zealand, before continuing nonstop to New York. The final part of the Southern Cross Route to London continued to be operated by Qantas' partners such as British Airways and American Airlines.

== Other operators ==
While the "Southern Cross Route" term and route was originated by BCPA and continues to be used as the official term by Qantas, it is often genericised by the media and other operators to refer to all flights between Australia and the United Kingdom via North America. Many airlines have operated the Australia to UK route via North America over the years; a notable first operator was Pan Am who received rights as part of the same air agreements that gave Qantas rights to operate across the United States.

As of 2026, there are three airlines operating the Southern Cross route (with seasonal destinations in italics):

Airline	Origin in Australia	Intermediate stop	Destination in the United Kingdom
Air Canada	Brisbane, Sydney	(Canada) Vancouver	London–Heathrow
American Airlines	Brisbane	(United States) Dallas/Fort Worth	London–Heathrow
American Airlines	Sydney	(United States) Los Angeles	London–Heathrow
United Airlines	Adelaide, Brisbane, Melbourne, Sydney	(United States) San Francisco	London–Heathrow
United Airlines	Melbourne, Sydney	(United States) Los Angeles	London–Heathrow
United Airlines	Sydney	(United States) Houston-Intercontinental	London–Heathrow

== See also ==
- Kangaroo Route – the Southern Cross Route's counterpart traveling via the Eastern Hemisphere
- Wallaby Route – route launched by Qantas in 1952 connecting Sydney to Johannesburg
