= List of superseded scientific theories =

Obsolete theories in natural history and natural philosophy

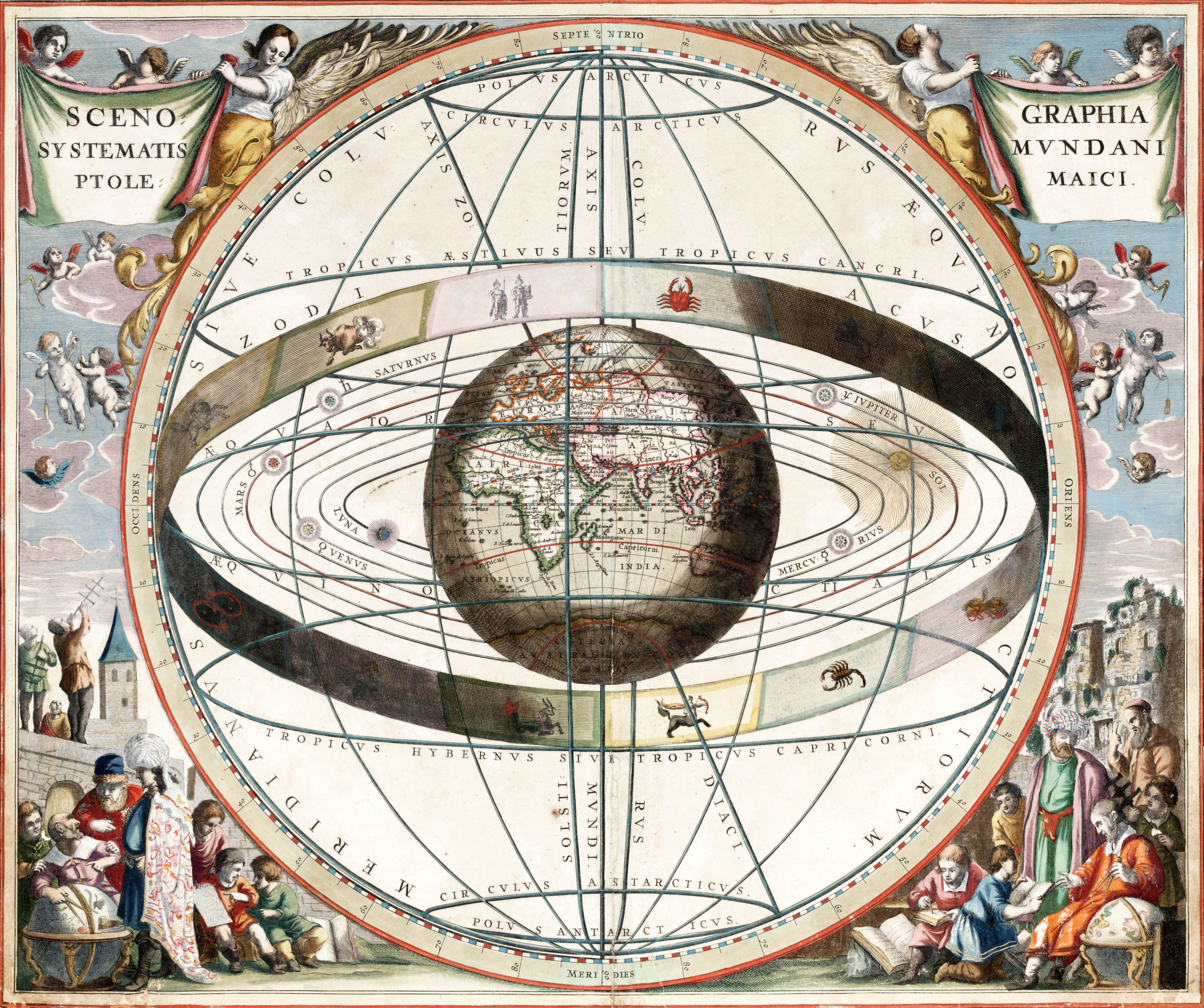
The obsolete geocentric model places Earth at the centre of the Universe.

This list includes well-known general theories in science and pre-scientific natural history and natural philosophy that have since been superseded by other scientific theories. Many discarded explanations were once supported by a scientific consensus, but replaced after more empirical information became available that identified flaws and prompted new theories which better explain the available data. Pre-modern explanations originated before the scientific method, with varying degrees of empirical support.

Some scientific theories are discarded in their entirety, such as the replacement of the phlogiston theory by energy and thermodynamics. Some theories known to be incomplete or in some ways incorrect are still used. For example, Newtonian classical mechanics is accurate enough for practical calculations at everyday distances and velocities, and it is still taught in schools. The more complicated relativistic mechanics must be used for long distances and velocities nearing the speed of light, and quantum mechanics for very small distances and objects.

Some aspects of discarded theories are reused in modern explanations. For example, miasma theory proposed that all diseases were transmitted by "bad air". The modern germ theory of disease has found that diseases are caused by microorganisms, which can be transmitted by a variety of routes, including touching a contaminated object, blood, and contaminated water. Malaria was discovered to be a mosquito-borne disease, explaining why avoiding the "bad air" near swamps prevented it. Increasing ventilation of fresh air, one of the remedies proposed by miasma theory, does remain useful in some circumstances to expel germs spread by airborne transmission, such as SARS-CoV-2.

Some theories originate in, or are perpetuated by, pseudoscience, which claims to be both scientific and factual, but fails to follow the scientific method. Scientific theories are testable and make falsifiable predictions. Thus, it can be a mark of good science if a discipline has a growing list of superseded theories, and conversely, a lack of superseded theories can indicate problems in following the use of the scientific method. Fringe science includes theories that are not currently supported by a consensus in the mainstream scientific community, either because they never had sufficient empirical support, because they were previously mainstream but later disproven, or because they are preliminary theories also known as protoscience which go on to become mainstream after empirical confirmation. Some theories, such as Lysenkoism, race science or female hysteria have been generated for political rather than empirical reasons and promoted by force.

== Science ==
=== Discarded scientific theories ===
==== Biology ====
- Spontaneous generation – a principle regarding the spontaneous generation of complex life from inanimate matter, which held that this process was a commonplace and everyday occurrence, as distinguished from univocal generation, or reproduction from parent(s). Falsified by an experiment by Louis Pasteur: where apparently spontaneous generation of microorganisms occurred, it did not happen on repeating the process without access to unfiltered air; on then opening the apparatus to the atmosphere, bacterial growth started.
- Transmutation of species, Inheritance of acquired characteristics, Lysenkoism – first theories of evolution. Not supported by experiment, and rendered obsolete by Darwinian evolution and Mendelian genetics, combined in the modern synthesis which finds that genes in the form of DNA are the primary way parental characteristics are passed to descendants. Discoveries in epigenetics have shown that in some very limited ways, the life experiences of organisms can affect the development of their children.
- Vitalism – the theory that living things are alive because of some "vital force" independent of matter, as opposed to because of some appropriate assembly of matter. It was gradually discredited by the rise of organic chemistry, biochemistry, and molecular biology, fields that failed to discover any "vital force." Friedrich Wöhler's synthesis of urea from ammonium cyanate was only one step in a long road, not a great refutation.
- Maternal impression – the theory that the mother's thoughts created birth defects. No experimental support (a notion rather than a theory), and rendered obsolete by genetic theory (see also fetal origins of adult disease, genomic imprinting).
- Preformationism – the theory that all organisms have existed since the beginning of life, and that gametes contain a miniature but complete preformed individual, and in the case of humans, a homunculus. No support when microscopy became available. Rendered obsolete by cytology, discovery of DNA, and atomic theory.
- Recapitulation theory – the theory that "ontogeny recapitulates phylogeny". See Baer's laws of embryology.
- Telegony – the theory that an offspring can inherit characteristics from a previous mate of its mother's as well as its actual parents, often associated with racism.
- Scientific racism – the theory that humanity consists of physically discrete superior or inferior races. Rendered obsolete by Human evolutionary genetics and modern anthropology.
- Germ line theory, explained immunoglobulin diversity by proposing that each antibody was encoded in a separate germline gene.

==== Chemistry ====
- Energeticism – a theory that attempted to reinterpret all chemistry in terms of energy, rejecting the concept of atoms.
- Caloric theory – the theory that a self-repelling fluid called "caloric" was the substance of heat. Rendered obsolete by the mechanical theory of heat. Origin of the calorie's name, a unit of energy still used for nutrition in some countries.
- Classical elements – All matter was once thought composed of various combinations of classical elements (most famously air, earth, fire, and water). Antoine Lavoisier finally refuted this in his 1789 publication, Elements of Chemistry, which contained the first modern list of chemical elements.
- Electrochemical dualism – the theory that all molecules are salts composed of basic and acidic oxides
- Phlogiston theory – The theory that combustible goods contain a substance called "phlogiston" that entered air during combustion. Replaced by Lavoisier's work on oxidation.
- Point 2 of Dalton's Atomic Theory was rendered obsolete by discovery of isotopes, and point 3 by discovery of subatomic particles and nuclear reactions.
- Radical theory – the theory that organic compounds exist as combinations of radicals that can be exchanged in chemical reactions just as chemical elements can be interchanged in inorganic compounds.
- Vitalism – See section on Biology.
- Nascent state refers to the form of a chemical element (or sometimes compound) in the instance of their liberation or formation. Often encountered are atomic oxygen (O_{nasc}) and nascent hydrogen (H_{nasc}), and chlorine (Cl_{nasc}) or bromine (Br_{nasc}).
- Polywater, a hypothesized polymer form of water, the properties of which actually arose from contaminants such as sweat.

==== Physics ====
- Corpuscularianism – theory that matter, gravity, light and magnetism are composed of tiny corpuscles
  - Corpuscular theory of light
- Emission theory of vision – the belief that vision is caused by rays emanating from the eyes was superseded by the intro-mission approach and more complex theories of vision.
- Aristotelian physics – superseded by Newtonian physics.
- Ptolemy's law of refraction, replaced by Snell's law.
- Luminiferous aether – failed to be detected by the sufficiently sensitive Michelson–Morley experiment, made obsolete by Einstein's work.
- Caloric theory – Lavoisier's successor to phlogiston, discredited by Rumford's and Joule's work.
- Vis viva – Gottfried Leibniz's elementary and limited early formulation of the principle of conservation of energy.
- Horror vacui/plenum – concept that nature 'abhors' the existence of vacuum.
- Imponderable fluid – various fluids used to explain the nature of heat and electricity in terms of undetectable fluids
- Emitter theory – another now-obsolete theory of light propagation.
- Electromotive force § History – the original theory by Alessandro Volta misunderstood the active agent of a voltaic cell to be a new type of force acting on the charges generated from contact of the electrodes, what he called contact tension. Michael Faraday later correctly explained that the active agent for batteries was a chemical reaction, although Volta's science is correct as part of contact electrification.
- Line of force – pre-existing theory to field.
- Balance of nature – superseded by catastrophe theory and chaos theory.
- Progression of atomic theory
  - Democritus, the originator of atomic theory, held that everything is composed of atoms that are indestructible. His claim that atoms are indestructible is not the reason it is superseded—as it was later scientists who identified the concept of atoms with particles, which later science showed are destructible. Democritus' theory is superseded because of his position that several kinds of atoms explain pure materials like water or iron, and characteristics that science now identifies with molecules rather than with indestructible primary particles. Democritus also held that between atoms, an empty space of a different nature than atoms allowed atoms to move. This view on space and matter persisted until Einstein described spacetime as being relative and connected to matter.
  - John Dalton's model of the atom, which held that atoms are indivisible and indestructible (superseded by nuclear physics) and that all atoms of a given element are identical in mass (superseded by discovery of atomic isotopes).
  - Plum pudding model of the atom—assuming the protons and electrons were mixed together in a single mass
  - Rutherford model of the atom with an impenetrable nucleus orbited by electrons
  - Bohr model with quantized orbits
  - Electron cloud model following the development of quantum mechanics in 1925 and the eventual atomic orbital models derived from the quantum mechanical solution to the hydrogen atom

==== Astronomy and cosmology ====
- Ptolemaic system – superseded by Nicolaus Copernicus' heliocentric model.
- Geocentric universe – superseded by Copernicus
- Copernican system – superseded by Tychonic system
- Heliocentric universe – made obsolete by discovery of the structure of the Milky Way and the redshift of most galaxies. Heliocentrism only applies to the selected Solar System, and only approximately, since the Sun's center is not at the Solar System's center of mass. Superseded by barycentric coordinates.
- Aristotelian Dynamics of the celestial spheres superseded by the Elliptic orbit and Kepler's laws of planetary motion
- Tychonic system – superseded by Newton's laws of motion
- Luminiferous aether theory
- Static Universe theory
- Steady state theory, a model developed by Hermann Bondi, Thomas Gold, and Fred Hoyle whereby the expanding universe was in a steady state, and had no beginning. It was a competitor of the Big Bang model until evidence supporting the Big Bang and falsifying the steady state was found.

==== Geography and climate ====
- Ptolemy's estimate of the size of the Earth
- Buenaventura River
- Flat Earth theory, generally known to be false among educated people in various ancient and medieval societies
- Terra Australis, which technically is Antarctica, but the original idea was based on an unproven belief that land in the Northern hemisphere must have a Southern counterpart for balance.
- Hollow Earth theory
- The Open Polar Sea, an ice-free sea once supposed to surround the North Pole
- Rain follows the plow – the theory that human settlement increases rainfall in arid regions (only true to the extent that crop fields evapotranspirate more than barren wilderness)
- Island of California – the theory that California was not part of mainland North America but rather a large island
- Strait of Anian – a supposed strait connecting the Pacific and Atlantic Oceans, superseded by the Bering Strait (discovered 1728)
- Mountains of Kong and Mountains of the Moon - mythical mountain ranges in Central Africa, based on the accounts of travelers
- Inland sea of Australia
- Pre-modern environmental determinism (as explanations for moral behavior, as opposed to modern theories such as factor endowments, state formation, and theories of the social effects of climate change)
  - Climatic determinism
  - Topographic determinism
  - Moral geography
  - Cultural acclimatization
- Global cooling
- Drainage divides as always being made up by hills and mountains.
- Ancient and medieval concepts surrounding the antipodes, including the related theories of antichthones and the alleged existence of a torrid zone (Note: Antipodes and antichthones do literally exist as opposite points on the Earth and people who live on and around them, but do not have any of the unique properties ascribed to them by ancient or medieval authors.)

==== Geology ====
- Abiogenic petroleum origin – While some petroleum or natural gas is almost certainly abiogenic, the vast majority has origins as living organisms
- Catastrophism was largely replaced by uniformitarianism and neocatastrophism
- Cryptoexplosion craters, now discarded in favour of impact craters and ordinary volcanism.
- Flood geology replaced by modern geology and stratigraphy
- Neptunism replaced by plutonism and volcanism
- Granitization, a discredited alternative to a magmatic origin of granites
- Monoglaciation, the idea that the Earth had a single ice age, replaced by polyglaciation, the idea that the Earth has gone through several periods of widespread ice cover.
- Oscillation theory of land-level rise and subsidence during deglaciation
- The following were superseded by plate tectonics:
  - Elevation crater theory
  - Expanding Earth theory (superseded by subduction)
  - Contracting Earth
  - Geosyncline theory
  - Haarman's Oscillation theory
  - Various lost landmasses including Lemuria

==== Psychology ====
- Pure behaviorist explanations for language acquisition in infancy, falsified by the study of cognitive adaptations for language.
- Psychomotor patterning, a pseudoscientific approach to the treatment of intellectual disabilities, brain injury, learning disabilities, and other cognitive diseases.

==== Medicine ====
- Theory of the four bodily humours (see also Four temperaments)
  - Heroic medicine – a therapeutic method derived from the belief in bodily humour imbalances as the cause of ailments.
- Miasma theory of disease – the theory that diseases are caused by "bad air". No experimental support, and rendered obsolete by the germ theory of disease.
- Zymotic theory of disease – the theory that diseases are produced by chemical fermentation of tissue. Rendered obsolete by the germ theory of disease.
- Phrenology – a theory of highly localised brain function popular in 19th century medicine.
- Homeopathy – a theory according to which a disease can be cured by infinitesimal doses of the substance that caused it
- Eclectic medicine – transformed into alternative medicine, and is no longer considered a scientific theory
- Physiognomy, related to phrenology, held that inner character was strongly correlated with physical appearance
- Tooth worm, an erroneous theory of the cause of dental caries, periodontitis, and toothaches

=== Obsolete branches of enquiry ===
- Alchemy, which led to the development of chemistry
- Astrology, which led to the development of astronomy
- Phrenology, a pseudoscience
- Numerology, a pseudoscience

=== Theories now considered incomplete ===
These theories that are no longer considered the most complete representation of reality but remain useful in particular domains or under certain conditions. For some theories, a more complete model is known, but for practical use, the coarser approximation provides good results with much less calculation.

- Newtonian mechanics was extended by the theory of relativity and by quantum mechanics. Relativistic corrections to Newtonian mechanics are immeasurably small at velocities not approaching the speed of light, and quantum corrections are usually negligible at atomic or larger scales; Newtonian mechanics is totally satisfactory in engineering and physics under most circumstances. The anomalous perihelion precession of Mercury was the first observational evidence that relativity was a more accurate model than Newtonian gravity.
- Classical electrodynamics is a very close approximation to quantum electrodynamics except at very small scales and low field strengths.
- The Bohr model of the atom was extended by the quantum mechanical model of the atom.
- The formula known as Newton's sine-square law of air resistance for the force of a fluid on a body was not actually formulated by Newton but by others using a method of calculation used by Newton; it has been found incorrect and not useful except for high-speed hypersonic flow.
- The once-popular cycle of erosion is now considered one of many possibilities for landscape evolution.
- The theory of continental drift was incorporated into and improved upon by plate tectonics.
- Rational choice theory as a model of human behavior
- Mendelian genetics, classical genetics, Boveri–Sutton chromosome theory – first genetic theories. Not invalidated as such, but subsumed into molecular genetics.

== See also ==
- Pseudoscience
- Scientific theory
- Philosophy of science
- Protoscience
- Fringe science
- Pathological science
- Paradigm shift
- History of evolutionary thought
- Creation–evolution controversy

=== Lists ===
- List of common misconceptions, including those about scientific subjects
- List of discredited substances
- List of experiments
- List of topics characterized as pseudoscience
- List of incorrect mathematical proofs
