= Codan (disambiguation) =

Codan or CODAN may refer to:

- Codan, an Australian manufacturer and supplier of communications, metal detection, and electronic equipment
- Codan A/S, a Danish insurance company

- Codan, a Danish rubber hose producer (Codan Rubber Danmark ApS) with global manufacturing sites
- Codan, a Danish company that produces health care products in Portugal, Denmark, Germany, United States, Switzerland and Italy

- CODAN, acronym for "Carrier Operated Discriminator Anti-Noise", a squelch circuit in a radio receiver

Many of the Danish companies are named after Codanus sinus.
