= Antipodes on Earth =

Diametrically opposite points on Earth's surface

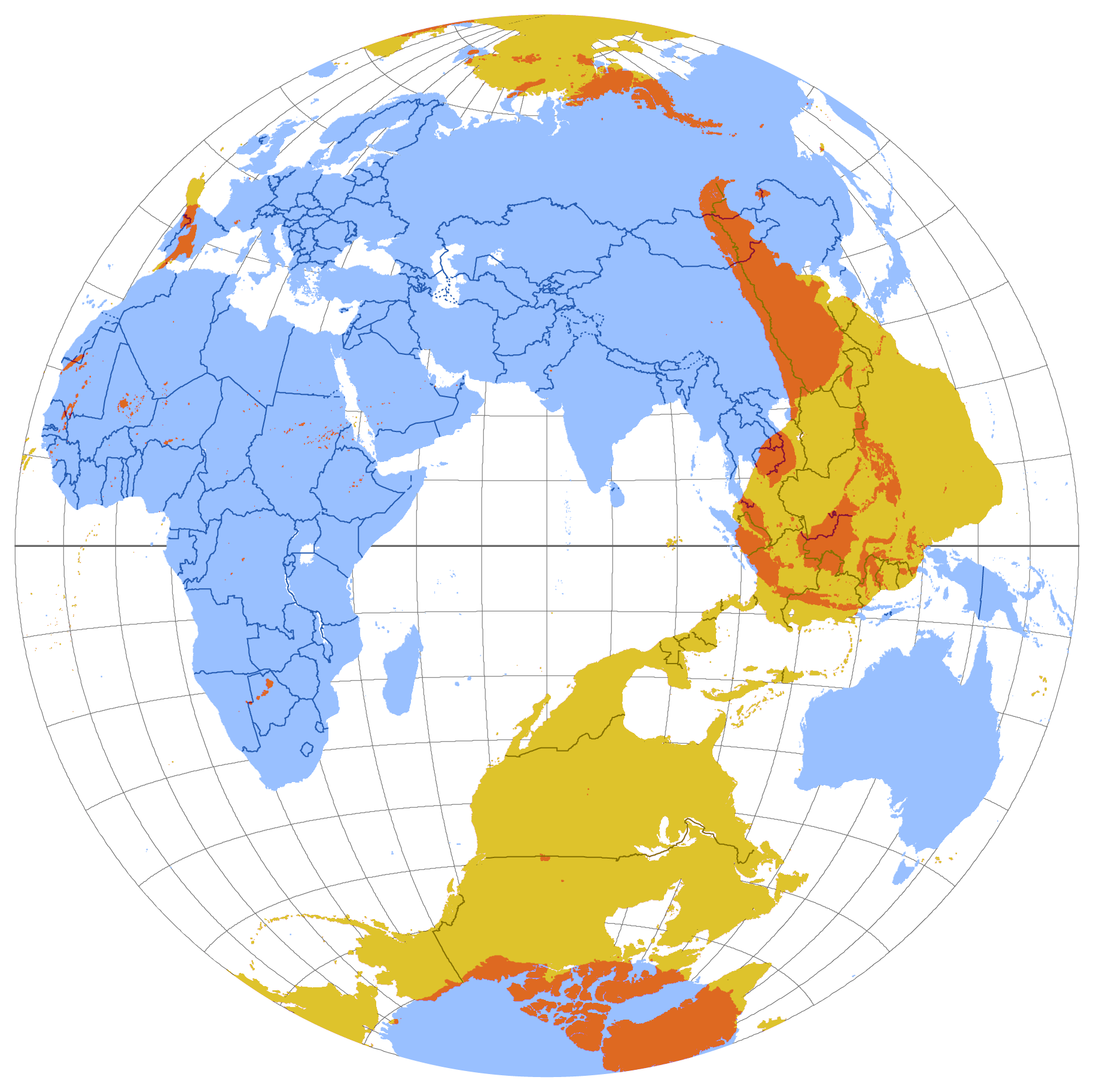
This map shows the antipode of each point on Earth's surface—the points where the blue and yellow overlap are land antipodes; most land has its antipodes in the ocean. This map uses the Lambert azimuthal equal-area projection. The yellow areas are the reflections through Earth's center of land masses of the opposite Western Hemisphere.

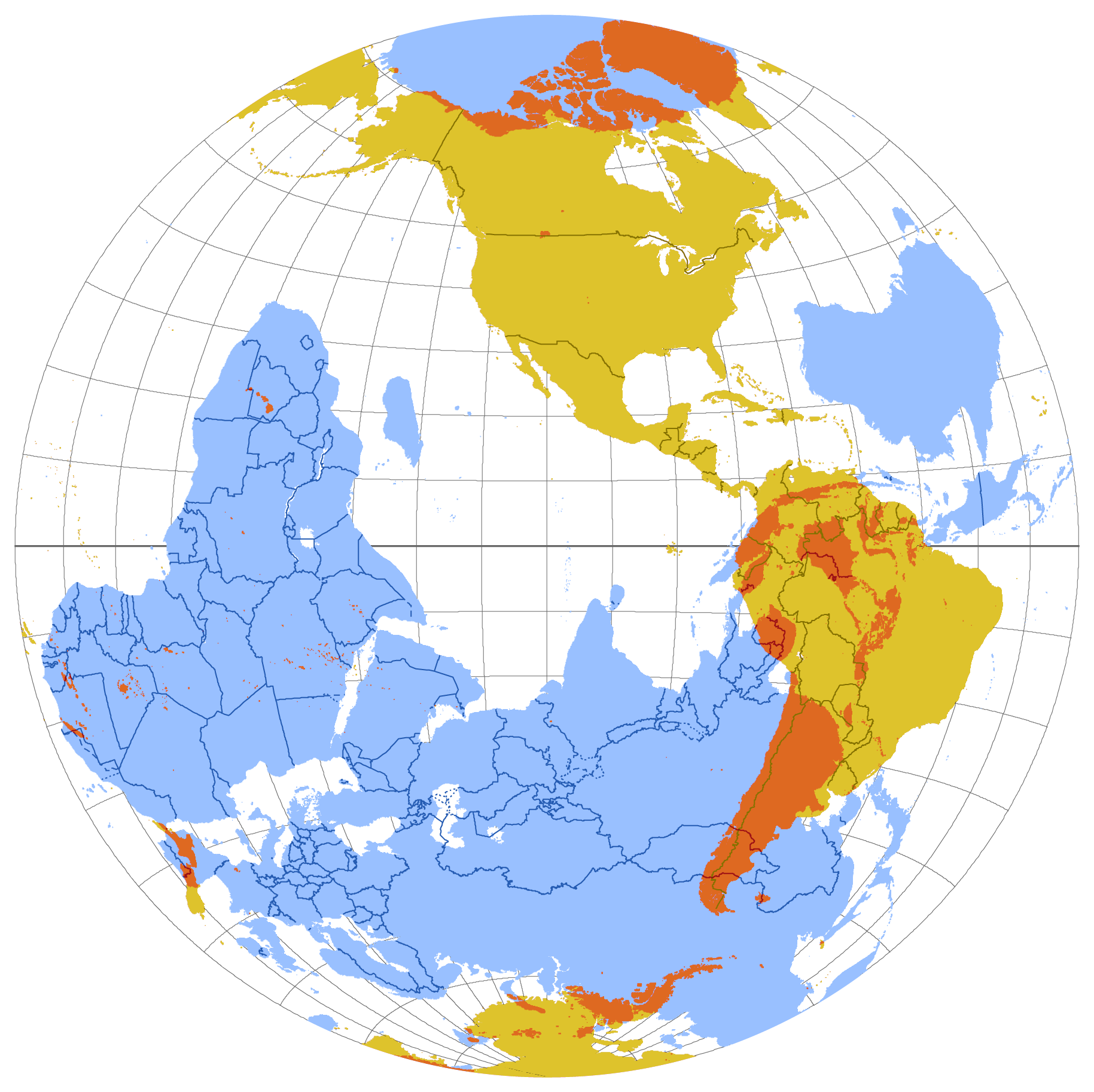
The same map, from the perspective of the Western Hemisphere. Here the blue areas are the reflections of the Eastern Hemisphere.

In geography, the antipode (/ˈæntɪˌpoʊd, ænˈtɪpədi/) of any spot on Earth is the point on Earth's surface diametrically opposite to it. A pair of points antipodal (/ænˈtɪpədəl/) to each other are situated such that a straight line connecting the two would pass through Earth's center. Antipodal points are as far away from each other as possible. (Note: In British English, "antipodes" can be either plural or singular.) The North and South Poles are antipodes of each other.

In the Northern Hemisphere, "the Antipodes" may refer to Australia and New Zealand, and Antipodeans to their inhabitants. Geographically, the antipodes of the British Isles are in the Pacific Ocean, south of New Zealand. This gave rise to the name of the Antipodes Islands of New Zealand, which are close to the antipode of London. The antipodes of Australia are in the North Atlantic Ocean, while parts of Spain, Portugal, France and Morocco are antipodal to New Zealand.

Approximately 15% of land territory is antipodal to other land, representing approximately 4.4% of Earth's surface. Another source estimates that about 3% of Earth's surface is antipodal land. The largest antipodal land masses are the Malay Archipelago, antipodal to the Amazon basin and adjoining Andean ranges; east China and Mongolia, and small sections of southeast Russia, antipodal to Argentina and Chile; and Greenland and the Canadian Arctic Archipelago, antipodal to East Antarctica. There is a general paucity of antipodal land because the Southern Hemisphere has comparatively less land than the Northern Hemisphere and, of that, the antipodes of Australia are in the North Atlantic Ocean, while the antipodes of southern Africa are in the North Pacific Ocean.

== Geography ==
Since the antipode of any place on the Earth is the place that is diametrically opposite of it, a line drawn from one to the other will pass through the centre of Earth and form a true diameter. For example, the antipodes of most of New Zealand's North Island lie in Spain. Most of the Earth's land surfaces have ocean at their antipodes; this is a natural consequence of most of the Earth's surface being covered in water.

The antipode of any place on Earth is distant from it by 180° of longitude and as many degrees to the north of the Equator as the original is to the south (or vice versa); in other words, the latitudes are numerically equal, but one is north and the other south. The maps shown here are based on this relationship; they show a Lambert azimuthal equal-area projection of the Earth, in yellow, overlaid on which is another map, in blue, shifted horizontally by 180° of longitude and inverted about the Equator with respect to latitude.

Solar noon (i.e. the time at which the sun is highest) at one place is solar midnight at the other, the winter solstice at one place is the summer solstice at the other, and the spring equinox at one place is the autumn equinox at the other. Sunrise and sunset do not quite oppose each other at antipodes due to refraction of sunlight.

=== Mathematical description ===
If the geographic coordinates (latitude and longitude) of a point on the Earth's surface are (φ, θ), then the coordinates of the antipodal point are (−φ, θ ± 180°). This relation holds true whether the Earth is approximated as a perfect sphere or as a reference ellipsoid.

In terms of the usual way these geographic coordinates are given, this transformation can be expressed symbolically as

x° N/S y° E/W ↦ x° S/N (180 − y)° W/E,

that is, for the latitude (the north–south coordinate) the magnitude of the angle remains the same but N is changed to S and vice versa, and for the longitude (the East/West coordinate) the angle is replaced by its supplementary angle while E is exchanged for W. For example, the antipode of the point in China at 37° N 119° E (a few hundred kilometres from Beijing) is the point in Argentina at 37° S 61° W (a few hundred kilometres from Buenos Aires).

== Etymology ==
The word antipodes comes from the Greek: ἀντίποδες (antípodes), plural of ἀντίπους (antipous), "with feet opposite (ours)", from ἀντί (antí, "opposite") + πούς (poús, "foot"). It is closely related to the word antipodas, meaning "opposite" or "the region opposite", which has the same etymology. Diogenes Laertius says: “he was the first to name the Antipodas in philosophy”. The Greek word "antipous (ἀντίπους)" is attested in Plato's dialogue Timaeus, already referring to a spherical Earth, explaining the relativity of the terms "above" and "below":

nay, even were a man to travel round it [a supposed solid body evenly-balanced at the centre of the Universe] in a circle he would often call the same part of it both “above” and “below,” according as he stood now at one pole, now at the opposite/antipous (ἀντίπους).

The term is taken up by Aristotle (De caelo 308a.20), Strabo (Geographica 1.1.13), Plutarch (On the Malice of Herodotus 37) and Diogenes Laërtius (Lives and Opinions of Eminent Philosophers book 3).

Eratosthenes of Cyrene (circa. 276–194 BC), the head of the Library of Alexandria, says in the poem Hermes that the Earth was girt around by five encircling zones, of which the two temperate, separated by the equatorial torrid, were where dwelt ‘the Antipodes men’. The term was adopted into Latin as antipodes. The Latin word changed its sense from the original "under the feet, opposite side" to "those with the feet opposite", i.e. a bahuvrihi referring to hypothetical people living on the opposite side of the Earth. Medieval illustrations imagine them in some way "inverted", with their feet growing out of their heads, pointing upward.

In this sense, Antipodes first entered English in 1398 in a translation of the 13th century De Proprietatibus Rerum by Bartholomeus Anglicus, translated by John of Trevisa:

Yonde in Ethiopia ben the Antipodes, men that haue theyr fete ayenst our fete.

(In Modern English: Yonder in Ethiopia are the Antipodes, men that have their feet against our feet.)

The modern English singular antipode arose in the 16th or 17th century as a back-formation from antipodes; antipous or the Latinate antipus would have been closer to the original singular. Most dictionaries suggest a pronunciation of /ˈæntɪˌpoʊd/ for this form.

== Historical significance ==
Both the Northern and Southern Hemispheres have been inhabited for most of human history. Humans first appeared in Eastern Africa around 200000 years ago and had spread throughout Africa, Eurasia, and Australia by 50000 to 55000 years ago. In spite of this, the presence of land in the Southern Hemisphere and the possibility of humans living there was a matter of debate among Mediterranean and European peoples from the ancient era until the Age of Exploration.

Herodotus said that Pharaoh Necho II of the 26th Dynasty (610–595 BC) commissioned an expedition of Phoenicians which in three years sailed from the Red Sea around Africa back to the mouth of the Nile, and that "as they sailed on a westerly course round the southern end of Libya (Africa), they had the sun on their right"— to northward of them, proving that they had been in the Southern Hemisphere.

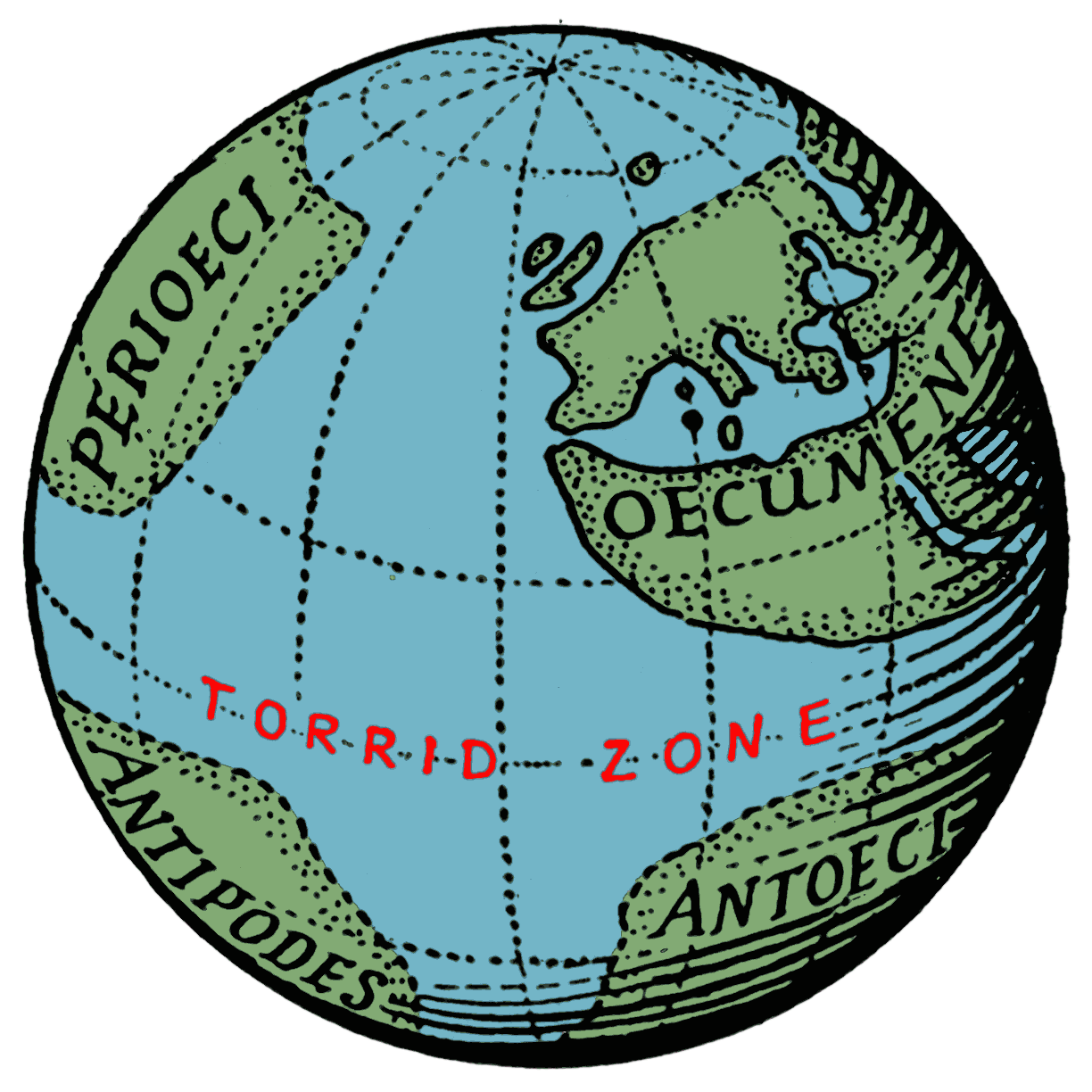
The Terrestrial Sphere of Crates of Mallus (c. 150 BCE), showing the region of the antipodes in the southern half of the western hemisphere

Pomponius Mela, the first Roman geographer, asserted that the Earth had two habitable zones, a North and South one, but that it would be impossible to get into contact with each other because of the unbearable heat at the Equator (De orbis situ 1.4). (Note: Almost the same assertion had been previously made in Ovid's Metamorphoses, Book 1, lines 45–51. See the fifth paragraph in More's translation of "The Creation".) Fifth-century Christian philosopher Augustine of Hippo was skeptical of the notion. Augustine asserted that "it is too absurd to say that some men might have set sail from this side and, traversing the immense expanse of ocean, have propagated there a race of human beings descended from that one first man."

In the Early Middle Ages, Isidore of Seville's widely read encyclopedia presented the term "antipodes" or, as he said "antipodas" as referring to antichthones (people who lived on the opposite side of the Earth), as well as to a geographical place:

Apart from these three parts of the world, there exists a fourth part beyond the interior Ocean; it is in the south and is unknown to us because of the burning heat of the Sun; within its borders the fabled Antipodeans are reputed to dwell.

In using the form antipodas rather than the more usual Latin antipodes Isidore simply transcribed the original Greek αντίποδας, the singular case of the name: the plural case is αντίποδες (antipodes), used in converting the name into Latin. These people came to play a role in medieval discussions about the shape of the Earth.

In 748, in reply to a letter from Boniface, Pope Zachary declared the belief "that beneath the earth there was another world and other men, another sun and moon" to be heretical. In his letter, Boniface had apparently maintained that Vergilius of Salzburg held such a belief.

The Norwegian work Konungs skuggsjá, written in the mid-13th century, considers the possibility of people living in the far south, beyond the torrid zone. It explains that people living near the southern frigid zone would see the midday sun to the north, and that the southern and northern regions would experience opposite seasons.

The earliest surviving account by a European who had visited the Southern Hemisphere is that of Marco Polo (who, on his way home in 1292, sailed south of the Malay Peninsula). He noted that it was impossible to see the star Polaris from there.

The antipodes being an attribute of a spherical Earth, the Christian Roman author Lactantius used their perceived absurdity as an argument for a flat Earth. However, knowledge of the spherical Earth was widespread in Europe by the Middle Ages, only occasionally disputed—the medieval dispute surrounding the antipodes mainly concerned the question whether people could live on the opposite side of the Earth: since the torrid clime was considered impassable, it would have been impossible to evangelize them. This posed the problem that Christ told the apostles to evangelize all mankind; with regard to the unreachable antipodes, this would have been impossible. Christ would either have appeared a second time, in the antipodes, or left the damned irredeemable. Such an argument was forwarded by the Spanish theologian Alonso Tostado as late as the 15th century and "St. Augustine doubts" was a response to Columbus's proposal to sail westwards to the Indies.

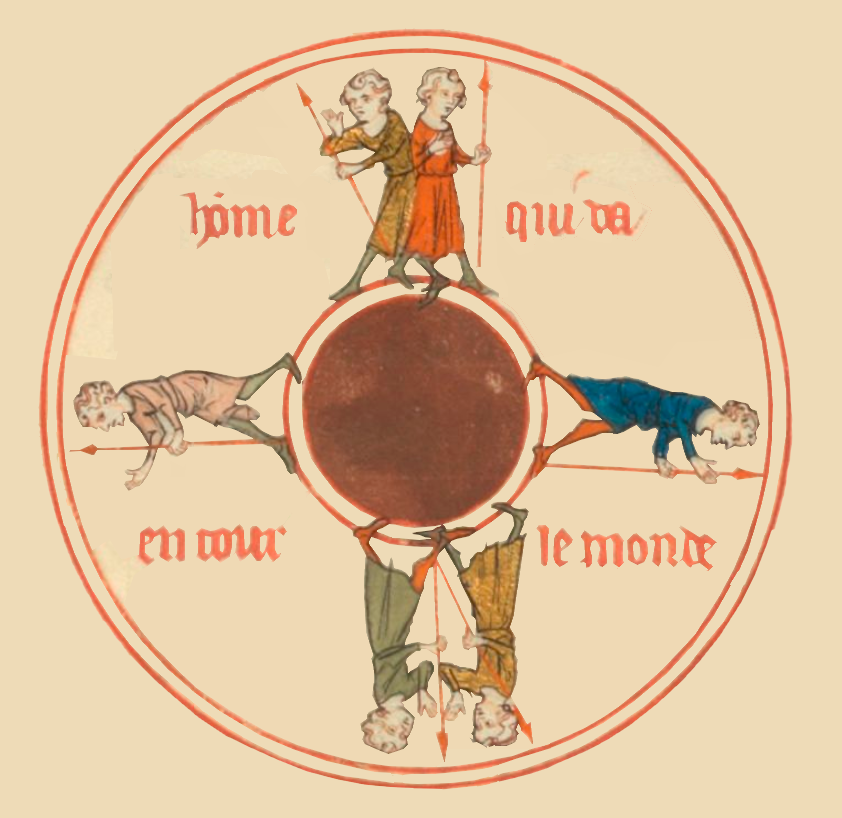
In this illustration of a thought experiment, two men walk in opposite directions and meet at the antipodes. 14th-century Image du monde.

The land reached by Columbus in 1492 was identified as that of the Antipodes by the diplomatist Peter Martyr who, in a letter he wrote from Barcelona dated 14 May 1493, said: "A few days since, a certain Christopher Columbus, a Ligurian, returned from the Western Antipodes". Perhaps influenced by this, Fernão Vaz Dourado in his Atlas of 1571 inscribed over the map of Mexico and adjacent parts of America, Tera Antipodum regis Castelle inventa a Xforo Columbo Januensi (Land of the Antipodes, discovered for the King of Castile by Christopher Columbus of Genoa).

The idea of dry land in the southern climes, the Terra Australis, was introduced by Ptolemy and appears on European maps as an imaginary continent from the 15th century. Antipodes was what Giovanni Contarini, on his world map of 1506 called the land later named America by Martin Waldseemüller. When the land discovered by Pedro Alvarez Cabral in April 1500, Brazil, was formally named Santa Cruz by the assembled Portuguese court on 20 May 1503, it was also referred to in the official record of the proceedings as the "Land of the Antipodes": terra Antipodum.

== Air travel between antipodes ==
=== Non-stop antipodal flights by commercial aircraft (scheduled) ===
There are currently no commercial aircraft capable of traveling non-stop between antipodes with a standard full commercial passenger load.

The current world record-holder Airbus A350-900ULR is capable of flying 18,000 kilometres (9,700 nmi; 11,000 mi), or roughly 90% of an average antipodal distance. Singapore Airlines currently holds the world record for the longest scheduled passenger flight, and utilizes this model in their non-stop Singapore to New York-JFK route SQ23/24.

In 2019, Qantas completed separate non-stop flights taking 19–20 hours to encompass the 16,013 km (9950 miles) from New York and 17,016 km (10,573 miles) from London, both to Sydney, Australia with a limit of 49 passengers on the Boeing 787 Dreamliner and who underwent medical tests on the flight. The London-Sydney direct routes are said to be the world's most profitable ultra-long haul flights annually. Their plans for the same pair of experiments were quickly put on hold due to global travel restrictions throughout the COVID-19 pandemic.

=== Non-stop antipodal flights by commercial aircraft (chartered) ===
In March 2021, a Comlux 787-8, registered P4-787, flew a non-scheduled (chartered), non-stop flight from Seoul Incheon to Buenos Aires, which are nearly antipodal points. This set a new record for the longest commercial non-stop flight with paying passengers, covering 19,483 kilometres (10,520 nmi; 12,106 mi) in 20 hours 19 minutes.

The business jet variant of the Airbus A350, the ACJ350, which entered into service in 2020, has a range of 20,550 km (12,770 miles), enabling it to operate between any two available antipodes. As of September 2021, there are three ACJ350s now in service globally. The owner of the first ACJ350, the German Government, has already taken it on a close to antipodal flight with a flight from Cologne, Germany to Canberra, Australia in November 2020. The upcoming Boeing business jet variant, the BBJ 777-8, will also have an antipodal reach with its published range of 21,570 km (13,403 miles). Both aforementioned variants from Airbus and Boeing are the first aircraft designed to handle flights exceeding the Earth's average antipodal distance of 20,000 km (12,420 miles).

=== Direct antipodal flights (scheduled) ===
Among flights with fuel stop and crew-change stop but still same flight number, Air New Zealand previously had the world's longest active scheduled flight — the Auckland–Los Angeles–London marathon, with an 'Origin - Destination great-circle distance' of 18,360 km or 11,410 mi and an 'Origin - Stop - Destination great-circle distance' of 19,240 km (11,960 mi) — until the airline cancelled this route in late 2019.

The current record holder is the even longer China Eastern Airlines flight MU745 from Shanghai—Auckland—Buenos Aires. This flight is by far the longest scheduled passenger flight in history and the first near-antipodal scheduled flight, being only approximately 443 km shorter than an exact antipode. It has an 'Origin - Destination great-circle distance' of 19,595 kilometres (12,176 mi; 10,580 nmi) and an 'Origin - Stop - Destination great-circle distance' of 19,680 kilometres (12,229 mi; 10,626 nmi).

=== Future theoretical antipodal routes ===
A hypothetically almost perfect antipodal flight would be Tangier Ibn Battouta Airport, Morocco (IATA: TNG), to Whangarei Airport, New Zealand (IATA: WRE), whose designated locators are 10,795 nautical miles (12,423 mi; 19,992 km) apart, almost the maximum possible distance. However, with only a length of 3,599 ft (1,097 m), Whangarei's runway is too short to accommodate any current (as of 2025) commercial jet airliner, especially one with the required range. Traveling between them would currently need at least two plane changes.

Another hypothetical antipodal flight between urban areas served by international airports would be Sanya Phoenix International Airport (IATA: SYX), in Sanya, Hainan, China, to Chacalluta International Airport (IATA: ARI) in Arica, Chile. Although the two urban cores do not overlap antipodally, their airports positioned so that the antipodal alignment deviates by less than 5 nautical miles (designated locators are 10,796 nautical miles (12,424 mi; 19,994 km) apart). Coincidentially these two major cities are the southernmost in China and northernmost in Chile, respectively. Currently, both international airports mainly operate regionally, though the Sanya airport is pivoting in order to attract Russian tourism to the resort city. For now, due to the lack of demand and sheer distance, direct commercial flight from East Asia to Latin America is virtually absent.

Other near-antipodal flight routes include:

- Hamilton, Bermuda and Perth: 12,389 mi (19,938 km) apart
- Haikou and Iquique: 12,378 mi (19,920 km) apart
- Taipei and Asunción: 12,367 mi (19,903 km) apart
- Santiago and Xi'an: 12,354 mi (19,882 km) apart
- Tangier and Auckland: 12,335 mi (19,851 km) apart
- Madrid and Wellington: 12,335 mi (19,851 km) apart
- Jakarta and Bogotá: 12,322 mi (19,830 km) apart
- Quito and Kuala Lumpur: 12,250 mi (19,710 km) apart
- Hanoi and La Paz: 11,932 mi (19,203 km) apart
- Johannesburg and Honolulu: 11,928 mi (19,196 km) apart

== List of antipodes ==
=== Earth ===
Some cities and towns which are near-antipodes in equirectangular projection. Blue labels pertain to cyan and brown labels pertain to yellow areas. Areas where cyan and yellow overlap (coloured green) are land antipodes.

Around 71% of the Earth's surface is covered by the ocean, and seven-eighths of the Earth's land (when excluding Antarctica) is confined to the land hemisphere, so the majority of locations on land do not have land-based antipodes. About 15% of the Earth's land has an antipode on land. Rough calculation shows that, of the 29% of the earth that is covered by land, if 15% of that has antipodes on land, then about 4% (0.15 × 29% = 4.35%) of the earth's surface has antipodes that are both land surfaces. Spilhaus estimates this at about 3%.

The two largest human-inhabited antipodal areas are located in East Asia (mainly eastern China) and South America (mainly Argentina and Chile). The two largest monolithic antipodal land areas are most of Chile and Argentina along with eastern and central China and Mongolia, and most of Greenland along with a part of Antarctica. The Australian mainland is the largest landmass with its antipodes entirely in ocean, although some locations of mainland Australia and Tasmania are close to being antipodes of islands (Bermuda, Azores, Puerto Rico) in the North Atlantic Ocean. The largest landmass with antipodes entirely on land is the island of Borneo, whose antipodes are in the Amazon rainforest.

==== Cities ====
Exact or almost exact antipodes:

- Christchurch (New Zealand) – A Coruña (Spain)
- Levin (New Zealand) – Ávila (Spain)
- Hamilton (New Zealand) – Córdoba (Spain)
- Santa Vitória do Palmar (Brazil) – Jeju (South Korea)
- Torres (Brazil) – Toshima, Kagoshima (Japan)
- Barra do Quaraí (Brazil) – Zhoushan (China)
- Hong Kong – La Quiaca (Argentina)
- Jaisalmer (India) - Easter Island
- Lianyungang (China) – Junín (Argentina)
- Madrid (Spain) – Weber (New Zealand)
- Mangawhai (New Zealand) – Rock of Gibraltar (British overseas territory)
- Masterton (New Zealand) – Segovia (Spain)
- Nelson (New Zealand) – Mogadouro (Portugal)
- Padang (Indonesia) – Esmeraldas (Ecuador)
- Palembang (Indonesia) – Neiva (Colombia)
- Pekanbaru (Indonesia) – Machachi (Ecuador)
- Tauranga (New Zealand) – Jaén (Spain)
- Ulan Ude (Russia) – Puerto Natales (Chile)
- Wellington (New Zealand) – Alaejos (Spain)
- Whangarei (New Zealand) – Tangier (Morocco)
- Wuhai (China) – Valdivia (Chile)
- Wuhu (China) – Rafaela (Argentina)
- Yueyang (China) – La Rioja (Argentina)

Ranking by the population of the smaller city, largest pairs of antipodes are Palembang (1.7m) and Neiva (360K), Christchurch (390K) and A Coruña (245K), Yueyang (1.3m) and La Rioja (210K).

To within 100 km (62 mi), with at least one major city (population of at least 1 million):

- Auckland (New Zealand) – Seville and Málaga (Andalusia, Spain)
- Beijing (China) – Bahía Blanca (Argentina)
- Nanjing (China) – Rosario (Argentina)
- Shanghai (China) – Salto (Uruguay)
- Taipei (Taiwan) – Asunción (Paraguay)
- Tianjin (China) – Bahía Blanca (Argentina)
- Xi'an (China) – Santiago, or more precisely Rancagua or San Bernardo (Chile)

Taiwan (formerly called Formosa) is partly antipodal to the province of Formosa in Argentina.

Capital cities within 200 km (120 mi) of each other's antipodes:

- Taipei (Taiwan) – Asunción (Paraguay), ~80 km (50 mi)
- Madrid (Spain) – Wellington (New Zealand), ~150 km (90 mi)
- Bogotá (Colombia) – Jakarta (Indonesia), ~200 km (120 mi)

Other major cities or capitals close to being antipodes:

- Rio de Janeiro (Brazil) – Tokyo (Japan); the host cities of successive Summer Olympic Games (2016 and 2020), ~1,450 km (900 mi)
- Beijing (China) – Buenos Aires (Argentina); both cities have populations in the millions, and have been twinned since 1983, ~540 km (340 mi)
- Shanghai (China) – Buenos Aires (Argentina); Buenos Aires is actually closer (~380 km (240 mi)) to the antipode of Shanghai (Salto, Uruguay) than to the antipode of Beijing (Bahía Blanca)
- Tongchuan (China) – Licantén (Chile)
- Guayaquil (Ecuador) – Medan (Indonesia), ~220 km (140 mi)
- Phnom Penh (Cambodia) – Lima (Peru), ~220 km (140 mi)
- Dili (Timor-Leste) – Paramaribo (Suriname), ~310 km (190 mi)
- Irkutsk (Russia) – Punta Arenas (Chile)
- Suva (Fiji) – Timbuktu (Mali)
- Melbourne and Canberra (Australia) – Azores, Atlantic Ocean (Portugal)
- Cherbourg-en-Cotentin (France) – Antipodes Islands (New Zealand)
- Pago Pago (American Samoa) – Zinder (Niger)
- Barranquilla (Colombia) – Christmas Island (Australia)
- Doha (Qatar) – Pitcairn Island (British overseas territory)
- Hué and Da Nang (Vietnam) – Arequipa (Peru)
- Manila (Philippines) – Cuiabá (Brazil)
- Kuala Lumpur (Malaysia) – Cuenca (Ecuador)
- San Juan (Puerto Rico) – Karratha (Australia)
- Limerick (Ireland) – Campbell Islands (New Zealand)
- Arrecife, Lanzarote (Canary Islands) – Norfolk Island
- Sharm el Sheikh (Egypt) – Rapa Iti (French Polynesia)
- Bangkok (Thailand) – Lima (Peru)
- Quito (Ecuador) – Singapore
- Perth (Australia) – Hamilton (Bermuda)
- Montevideo (Uruguay) – Gwangju (South Korea)
- Georgetown (Ascension Island) – Majuro (Marshall Islands)

==== Cities and geographic features ====
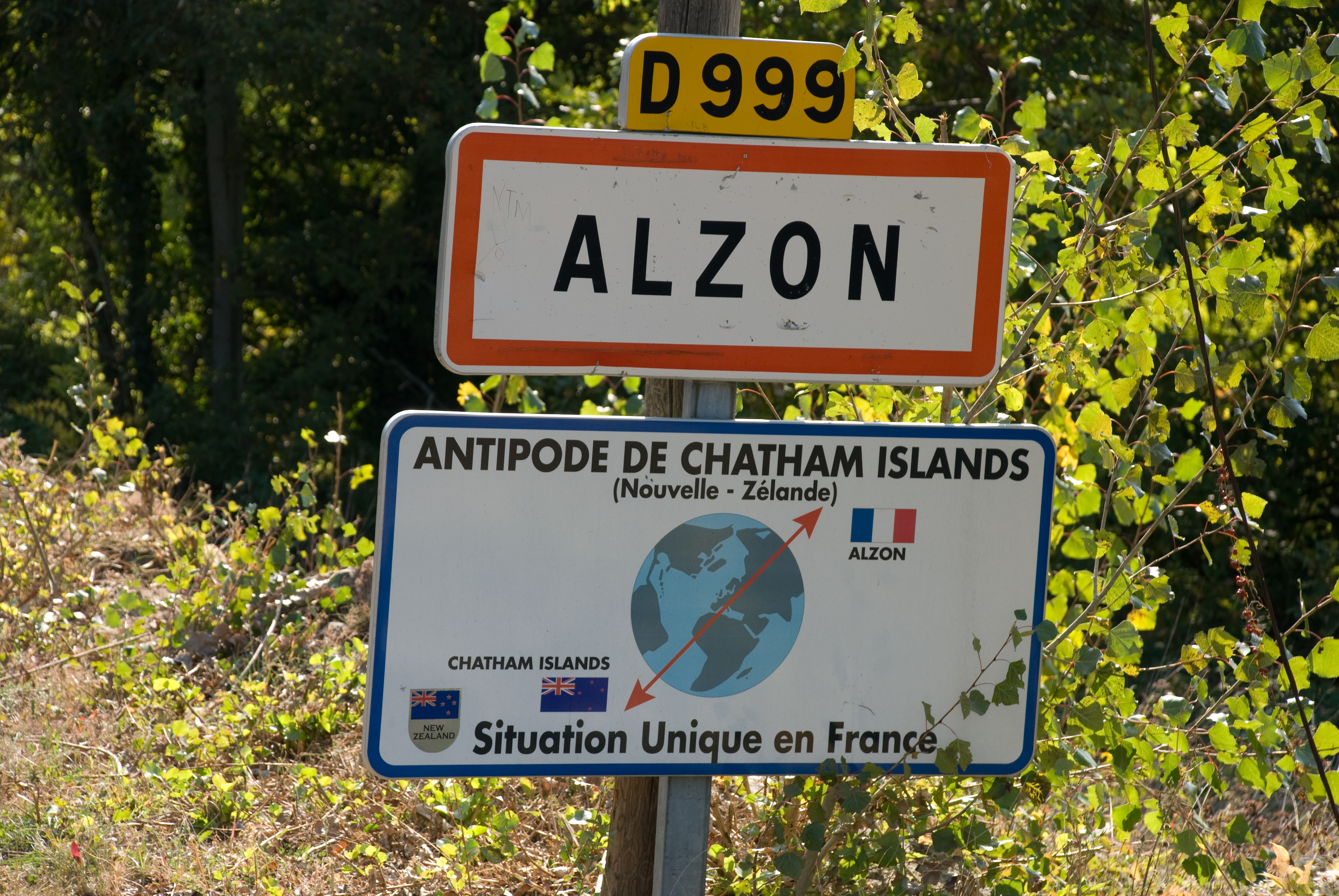
The villages of Alzon, France and Waitangi, New Zealand are an example of antipodal settlements.

===== North and South Poles =====
By definition, the North Pole and the South Pole are antipodes.

===== Gibraltar and New Zealand =====
Gibraltar is approximately antipodal to Te Ārai - about 85 km (53 mi) north of Auckland, New Zealand. This illustrates the old yet correct saying that the sun never sets on the British Empire; the sun still does not set on the Commonwealth of Nations.

===== New Caledonia and Mauritania =====
The northern part of New Caledonia, an overseas territory of France, is antipodal to some thinly populated desert in Mauritania, a part of the former French West Africa.

===== Suriname and Indonesia =====
Portions of Suriname, a former Dutch colony, are antipodal to Sulawesi, an Indonesian island spelled Celebes when it was part of the Netherlands East Indies.

===== Philippines and Bolivia =====
Luzon, the largest island of the Philippines, is antipodal to eastern Bolivia. Both countries were once part of the Spanish Empire.

===== Brazil and South Korea =====
Santa Vitória do Palmar, the most southerly town of more than 10,000 people in Brazil, is antipodal to Jeju Island, the southernmost territory of South Korea.

===== Hawaii and Botswana =====
Hawaii is antipodal to parts of Botswana. The Big Island of Hawaii is antipodal to the Okavango Delta in Botswana, with the island's largest city, Hilo, antipodal to Nxai Pan National Park.

===== Kerguelen Islands and North America =====
The desolate French territory of the Kerguelen Islands are antipodal to an area of sparsely inhabited prairie between Cypress County, Alberta, and the Rural Municipality of Reno, Saskatchewan, Canada; and Liberty County, Montana, United States. The only permanent settlement on Kerguelen Island, the research station Port-aux-Français, is antipodal to fields 10 km (6.2 mi) northeast of Senate, Saskatchewan. Other Canadian towns in Saskatchewan with antipodes on Kerguelen Island include: Consul, Nashlyn and Govenlock in the vicinity of Senate, and in Alberta Eagle Butte, Elkwater and Manyberries as well as the Red Coat Trail between Orion, Alberta and Etzikom. The communities of Goldstone, Fox Crossing, and Sage Creek Colony in Montana have antipodes on Kerguelen Island.

===== St. Paul and Amsterdam Islands and Colorado =====
St. Paul Island and Amsterdam Island are antipodal to sparsely populated parts of Eastern Colorado, United States. They are situated approximately 10.2 km (6.3 mi) south-south-east of Firstview and 30.5 km (19.0 mi) south-south-west of Granada, Colorado, respectively. Together with the northern part of Liberty County, Montana, they are the only three areas of the contiguous United States with antipodes on land.

===== Antarctica and North America =====
The north-eastern coast of Alaska from Utqiaġvik (formerly Barrow) over Prudhoe Bay to the Canadian border, and the coasts of the Canadian territories of Yukon, Northwest Territories, and Nunavut, are antipodal to Antarctica.

===== Heard and McDonald Islands and Canada =====
The Heard Island and McDonald Islands, an uninhabited Australian territory, is antipodal to an area in central Saskatchewan, Canada, including the towns of Leask and Shellbrook.

===== Angola and Johnston Atoll =====
Tigres Island, the largest uninhabited island of Angola, is approximately antipodal to Johnston Atoll, which is the third largest uninhabited island of the United States.

===== Easter Island and India =====
Easter Island is antipodal to an area close to Desert National Park, 35 km (22 mi) from Jaisalmer, India. The only town on Easter Island, Hanga Roa, is antipodal to the village of Serawa 46 km (29 mi) northeast of Jaisalmer. Serawa is the only village in India to be antipodal to a human settlement. Its neighbouring villages Mokla and the northern part of Bhadasar also have antipodes on Easter Island. The small, rocky, uninhabited island of Sala y Gómez, 391 km (243 mi) east-northeast of Easter Island, is antipodal to an area in the city of Ajmer, India, just east of Ana Sagar Lake. The rest of India has antipodes in the sea.

===== Kiribati and the Democratic Republic of the Congo =====
Kiritimati, the largest island of Kiribati and the largest coral atoll in the world, is antipodal to Salonga National Park, which is the largest national park of the Democratic Republic of the Congo and the largest tropical rainforest reserve in Africa.

===== Portugal and New Zealand =====
Serra da Estrela Natural Park, the largest natural park of Portugal, is antipodal to Kahurangi National Park, the second largest national park of New Zealand.

===== South Georgia Island and Russia =====
South Georgia Island (part of the British Overseas Territory of South Georgia and the South Sandwich Islands) is antipodal to the northernmost part of Sakhalin Island, Russia.

===== Lake Baikal and the Strait of Magellan =====
Lake Baikal, Russia is partially antipodal to the Strait of Magellan.

===== Bellinghausen Station, Antarctica and Siberia =====
The Russian Antarctic research base Bellingshausen Station is antipodal to a land location in Siberia, Russia.

===== Australia and Bermuda =====
Rottnest Island, off the coast of Western Australia, is approximately antipodal to the British Overseas Territory of Bermuda.

===== Cocos (Keeling) Islands and Nicaragua =====
Cocos (Keeling) Islands, an Australian external territory in the Indian Ocean, is almost antipodal to Nicaragua's Corn Islands.

===== Azores and Australia =====
Flores Island, the westernmost island of the Azores, a Portuguese archipelago in the Atlantic Ocean, is nearly antipodal to Flinders Island between Tasmania and the Australian mainland.

===== Point Nemo and Kazakhstan =====
Point Nemo, the point in the Southern Pacific Ocean most distant from any other land, is precisely opposite a desolate piece of desert in western Kazakhstan.

===== 0°N 0°E and 0°N 180°E =====
Null Island, 0°N 0°E, at the intersection of the prime meridian and the equator, has its antipodes at 0°N 180°E, at the intersection of the antimeridian and the equator. This point lies northeast of Nikunau in the Gilbert Islands and southwest of Baker Island, a United States territory.

===== Pacific Ocean =====
As can be seen on the purple/blue map, the Pacific Ocean is so large that it stretches halfway around the world; parts of the Pacific off the coast of Peru are antipodal to parts of the same ocean off the coast of Southeast Asia. For example, the island of Ko Chang—which is the second or third largest island in Thailand—is nearly antipodal to San Lorenzo Island, which is the largest island of Peru.

===== Antipodes Islands and France =====
The antipodes of the Antipodes Islands, New Zealand, considered by early European explorers to be antipodal to the United Kingdom, are the town of Barfleur on France's Cotentin Peninsula.

===== Mecca and French Polynesia =====
The remote Pacific atoll of Tematagi, French Polynesia is antipodal to the Islamic holy city of Mecca, Saudi Arabia, meaning the direction of Muslim prayer would vary widely from that of surrounding islands.

===== Angkor Wat and Machu Picchu =====
Angkor Wat, Cambodia is roughly antipodal to Machu Picchu, Peru.

==== List of countries by number of antipodal countries ====
The following countries are opposite more than one other country. (Antarctica is considered as a country for the purposes of this chart and various countries' Antarctic territorial claims are disregarded)

Country	Total no. of antipodal countries	No. of countries antipodal to the mainland	No. of countries antipodal to overseas territories	Antipodal countries
France	12	1	11	Mainland: New Zealand (Chatham Islands); Overseas France: French Guiana: Indonesia; French Polynesia: Egypt; Eritrea; Ethiopia; Saudi Arabia; Sudan; French Southern and Antarctic Lands: Canada; United States; New Caledonia: Mauritania; Western Sahara; Wallis and Futuna: Niger
New Zealand	12	4	8	Mainland: Morocco; Portugal; Spain; United Kingdom (Gibraltar); Overseas territories and associated states: Chatham Islands: France; Cook Islands: Cameroon; Central African Republic; Chad; Libya; Nigeria; Kermadec Islands: Algeria; Niue: Niger; Tokelau: Nigeria
Brazil	9	9	0	Brunei, China, Indonesia, Japan, Malaysia, Micronesia, Palau, Philippines, South Korea
Indonesia	8	8	0	Ecuador, Peru, Colombia, Venezuela, Brazil, Suriname, Guyana, France (French Guiana)
Peru	7	7	0	Vietnam, Cambodia, Laos, Thailand, Malaysia, Indonesia, China
United Kingdom	7	0	7	Falklands: China, Russia; Gibraltar: New Zealand; South Georgia and the South Sandwich Islands: Russia; Pitcairn: Saudi Arabia, UAE; Bermuda: Australia
United States	7	1	6	Mainland: France (Southern & Antarctic Lands); Hawaii: Botswana, Namibia; Alaska: Antarctica; Palmyra Atoll & Kingman Reef: DR Congo; American Samoa: Niger, Nigeria
China	6	6	0	Argentina, Chile, Uruguay, Brazil, Bolivia, UK (Falkland Islands)
Antarctica	5	5	0	Greenland, Canada, United States, Russia, Norway
Niger	5	5	0	Samoa, Tonga, United States (American Samoa), France (Wallis and Futuna), New Zealand (Niue)
Argentina	4	4	0	China, Taiwan, Mongolia, Russia
Australia	4	2	2	Mainland: Bermuda (UK), Portugal (Azores); Heard Island and McDonald Islands: Canada; Christmas Island: Colombia
Chile	4	3	1	China, Mongolia, Russia; Easter Island: India
Kiribati	4	4	0	Phoenix Islands (Orona): Nigeria; Line Islands: DR Congo, Central African Republic, Sudan
Malaysia	4	4	0	Ecuador, Peru, Brazil, Colombia
Russia	4	4	0	Antarctica, Chile, Argentina, United Kingdom (Falklands and British Antarctic Territory)
Canada	3	3	0	Antarctica, France (Kerguelen), Australia (Heard Island and McDonald Islands)
Colombia	3	3	0	Indonesia, Malaysia, Australia (Christmas Island)
Ecuador	3	3	0	Malaysia, Singapore, Indonesia
Mali	3	3	0	Fiji, Vanuatu, Solomon Islands
Nigeria	3	3	0	New Zealand (Tokelau, Cook Ils), United States (American Samoa), Kiribati
Paraguay	3	3	0	Taiwan, Japan, Philippines
Philippines	3	3	0	Brazil, Bolivia, Paraguay
Vanuatu	3	3	0	Mauritania, Senegal, (Mere Lava) Mali
Algeria	2	2	0	Tonga, New Zealand (Kermadec)
Bolivia	2	2	0	China, Philippines
Central African Republic	2	2	0	Kiribati, New Zealand (Cook Ils)
Democratic Republic of the Congo	2	2	0	Kiribati, United States (Palmyra, Kingman Reef)
Fiji	2	1	1	Mali; (Rotuma) Burkina Faso
Japan	2	1	1	(Ryukyu) Brazil, Paraguay
South Korea	2	2	0	Uruguay, Brazil
Mauritania	2	2	0	France (New Caledonia), Vanuatu
Mongolia	2	2	0	Chile, Argentina
Norway	2	2	0	(Svalbard) Antarctica, (Peter I Island) Russia
Portugal	2	1	1	Mainland: New Zealand; Azores: Australia (Melbourne)
Saudi Arabia	2	2	0	France (French Polynesia), UK (Pitcairn)
Solomon Islands	2	2	0	Guinea, (Tikopia) Mali
Sudan	2	2	0	France (French Polynesia), Kiribati
Taiwan	2	2	0	Paraguay, Argentina
Tonga	2	2	0	Algeria, Niger
Tuvalu	2	2	0	Ghana, (Nanumanga, Nanumea) Ivory Coast
Uruguay	2	2	0	China, South Korea
Brunei	1	1	0	Brazil
Burkina Faso	1	1	0	Fiji
Cambodia	1	1	0	Peru
Cameroon	1	1	0	New Zealand (Cook Islands)
Chad	1	1	0	New Zealand (Cook Islands)
Egypt	1	1	0	France (French Polynesia)
Eritrea	1	1	0	France (French Polynesia)
Ethiopia	1	1	0	France (French Polynesia)
Ghana	1	1	0	Tuvalu
Guinea	1	1	0	Solomon Islands
Ivory Coast	1	1	0	Tuvalu
India	1	1	0	Chile (Easter Island)
Laos	1	1	0	Peru
Libya	1	1	0	New Zealand (Cook Islands)
Micronesia	1	1	0	Brazil
Morocco	1	1	0	New Zealand
Palau	1	1	0	Brazil
Senegal	1	1	0	Vanuatu
Singapore	1	1	0	Ecuador
Spain	1	1	0	New Zealand
Suriname	1	1	0	Indonesia
Thailand	1	1	0	Peru
United Arab Emirates	1	1	0	United Kingdom (Pitcairn)
Venezuela	1	1	0	Indonesia
Vietnam	1	1	0	Peru

Countries matching up with just one other country are Morocco, Spain, Chad, Libya, Cameroon (with the Cook Islands of New Zealand); Egypt, Eritrea, Ethiopia (with French Polynesia); Senegal (Vanuatu); the UAE (Pitcairn); Ghana, Ivory Coast (Tuvalu); Burkina Faso (Rotuma in Fiji); Guinea (Solomon Islands); India (Easter Island); Laos, Cambodia, Vietnam, and Thailand (all with Peru); Singapore (Ecuador); Brunei, Palau, Micronesia (all with Brazil); Venezuela and Suriname (Indonesia).

The only countries which are entirely antipodal to land are Brunei, Fiji, Malaysia, the Philippines, Samoa, Taiwan, and Vanuatu. Chile was as well prior to its expansion into the Atacama Desert with the War of the Pacific.

===== Antipodal map of the United States =====
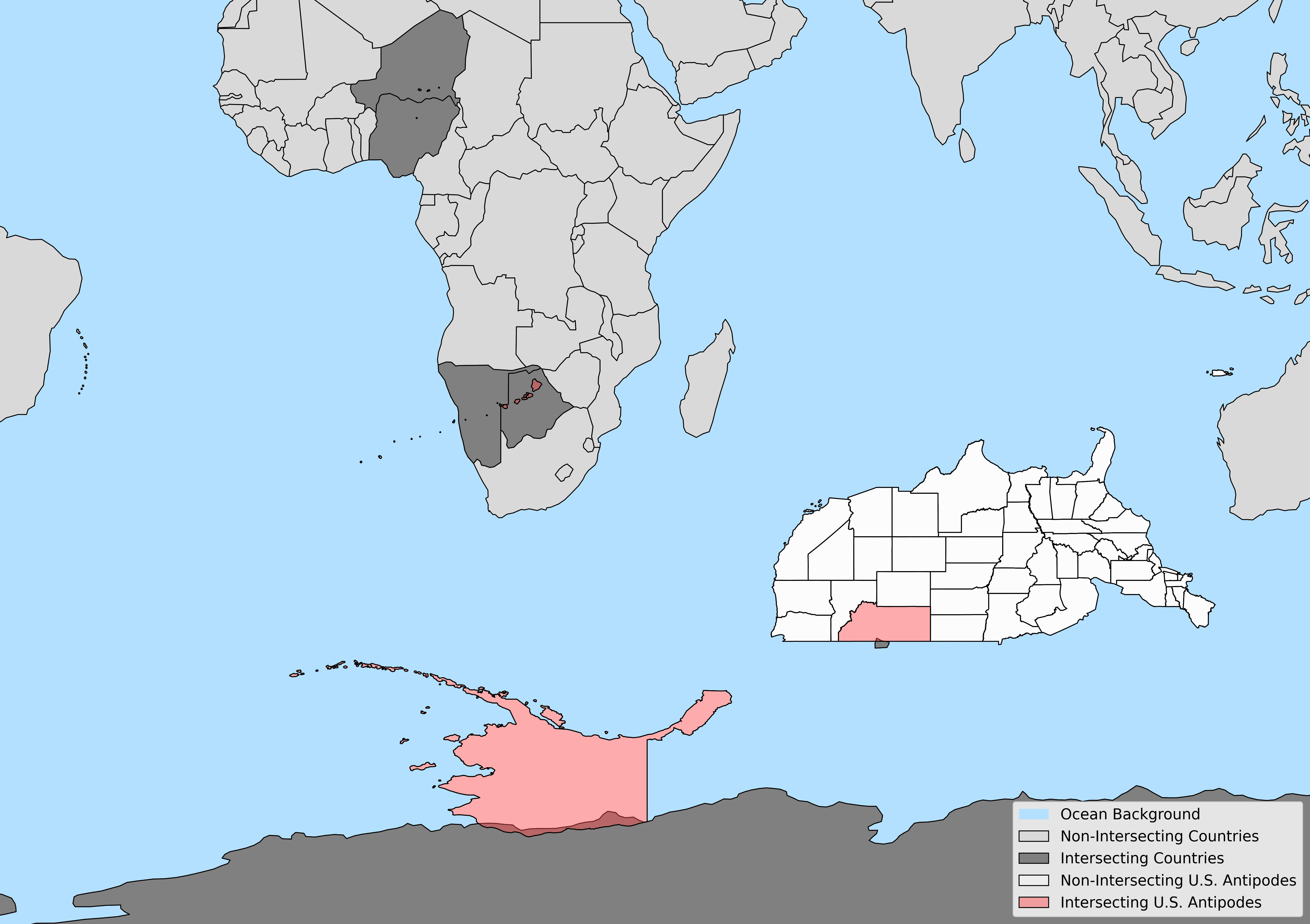
Map of U.S. States and Territory antipodes, highlighting those that overlap with land in other countries.

== Antipodes beyond Earth ==
In a number of cases on extraterrestrial bodies in the Solar System, unusual geologic features (e.g., jumbled terrain or unique volcanic constructs) are located antipodal to major impact basins. It has been hypothesized that this results from focusing of some of the seismic waves (p-waves and surface waves) produced by an impact at its antipode.

- Caloris Basin – "Weird Terrain" (Mercury)
- Mare Orientale – Mare Marginis (The Moon)
- Mare Imbrium – Mare Ingenii (The Moon)
- Hellas Planitia – Alba Mons (Mars)
- Isidis Planitia – Noctis Labyrinthus (Mars)
- Kerwan – Ahuna Mons (Ceres)

== In popular culture ==
- In the Shakespeare comedy Much Ado About Nothing, Benedick offers to travel from Messina to the Antipodes in an apparent attempt to avoid the company of Beatrice.
- On the TV show Angel, the Deeper Well is a hole that goes through the world, with its entrance in the Cotswolds in England and its antipode in New Zealand.
- At the closing ceremonies of the Rio 2016 Olympics, antipodes were used as a tool to invite viewers to the Tokyo 2020 Olympics, including an image of the video game character Mario using his pipes to travel between Tokyo and Rio, arriving at the closing ceremonies.
- In the 2012 film Total Recall, a gravity train called "The Fall" goes through the center of the Earth to allow people to commute between Western Europe and Australia.
- In 2006, Ze Frank challenged viewers of his daily webcast the show with zefrank to create an "Earth sandwich" by simultaneously placing two pieces of bread at antipodal points on the Earth's surface. The challenge was successfully completed by viewers in Spain and New Zealand.
- The song "Ana Ng" by alternative rock band They Might Be Giants is about someone who believes that their soulmate lives antipodal to them. John Linnell, the singer and songwriter, has since joked that because the name Ng is Vietnamese and Peru is the antipode of Vietnam, "…the song, presumably, is about somebody in Peru, writing about somebody in Vietnam. But I didn't know that when I wrote it."

== See also ==
- Antichthones
- Antipodal hotspot
- Antipodal point
- Antipodes Islands
- Clime
- Pole of inaccessibility
- Spherical Earth
