= Radical theory =

Obsolete theory of chemistry

Radical theory is an obsolete scientific theory in chemistry describing the structure of organic compounds. The theory was pioneered by Justus von Liebig, Friedrich Wöhler and Auguste Laurent around 1830 and is not related to the modern understanding of free radicals. In this theory, organic compounds were thought to exist as combinations of radicals that could be exchanged in chemical reactions just as chemical elements could be interchanged in inorganic compounds.

== Preamble ==
The term radical was already in use when radical theory was developed. Louis-Bernard Guyton de Morveau introduced the phrase "radical" in 1785 and the phrase was employed by Antoine Lavoisier in 1789 in his Traité Élémentaire de Chimie. A radical was identified as the root base of certain acids (The Latin word "radix" meaning "root"). The combination of a radical with oxygen would result in an acid. For example the radical of acetic acid was called "acetic" and that of muriatic acid (hydrochloric acid) was called "muriatic". Joseph Louis Gay-Lussac found evidence for the cyanide radical in 1815 in his work on hydrogen cyanide and a number of cyanide salts he discovered. He also isolated cyanogen ((CN)_{2}) not realizing that cyanogen is the cyanide dimer NC-CN. Jean-Baptiste Dumas proposed the ethylene radical from investigations into diethyl ether and ethanol. In his Etherin theory he observed that ether consisted of two equivalents of ethylene and one equivalent of water and that ethylene and ethanol could interconvert in chemical reactions. Ethylene was also the base fragment for a number of other compounds such as ethyl acetate. This Etherin theory was eventually abandoned by Dumas in favor of radical theory. As a radical it should react with an oxide to form the hydrate but it was found that ethylene is resistant to an oxide like calcium oxide. Henri Victor Regnault in 1834 reacted ethylene dichloride (CH_{2}CH_{2}.Cl_{2}) with KOH forming vinyl chloride, water, and KCl. In etherin theory it should not be possible to break up the ethylene fragment in this way.

Radical theory replaced electrochemical dualism which stated that all molecules were to be considered as salts composed of basic and acidic oxides.

== Theory ==
Liebig and Wöhler observed in 1832 in an investigation of benzoin resin (benzoic acid) that the compounds almond oil (benzaldehyde), "Benzoestoff" (benzyl alcohol), benzoyl chloride and benzamide all share a common C_{7}H_{5}O fragment and that these compounds could all be synthesized from almond oil by simple substitutions. The C_{7}H_{5}O fragment was considered a "radical of benzoic acid" and called benzoyl. Organic radicals were thus placed on the same level as the inorganic elements. Just like the inorganic elements (simple radicals) the organic radicals (compound radicals) were indivisible. The theory was developed thanks to improvements in elemental analysis by von Liebig. Laurent contributed to the theory by reporting the isolation of benzoyl itself in 1835, however the isolated chemical is today recognised at its dimer dibenzoyl. Raffaele Piria reported the salicyl radical as the base for salicylic acid. Liebig published a definition of a radical in 1838

Berzelius and Robert Bunsen investigated the radical cacodyl (reaction of cacodyl chloride with zinc) around 1841, now also known as a dimer species (CH_{3})_{2}As—As(CH_{3})_{2}. Edward Frankland and Hermann Kolbe contributed to the radical theory by investigating the ethyl and the methyl radicals. Frankland first reported diethylzinc in 1848. Frankland and Kolbe together investigated the reaction of ethyl cyanide and zinc in 1849 reporting the isolation of not the ethyl radical but the methyl radical (CH_{3}) which in fact was ethane. Kolbe also investigated the electrolysis of potassium salts of some fatty acids. Acetic acid was regarded as the combination of the methyl radical and oxalic acid and electrolysis of the salt yielded as gas again ethane misidentified as the liberated methyl radical. In 1850 Frankland investigated ethyl radicals. In the course of this work butane formed by reaction of ethyl iodide and zinc was mistakenly identified as the ethyl radical.

== Demise ==
August Wilhelm von Hofmann, Auguste Laurent and Charles Frédéric Gerhardt challenged Frankland and Kolbe by suggesting that the ethyl radical was in fact a dimer called dimethyl. Frankland and Kolbe countered that ethyl hydride was also a possibility and in 1864 Carl Schorlemmer proved that dimethyl and ethyl hydride were in fact one and the same compound.

Radical theory was eventually replaced by a number of theories each advocating specific entities. One adaptation of radical theory was called theory of types (theory of residues), advocated by Charles-Adolphe Wurtz, August Wilhelm von Hofmann and Charles Frédéric Gerhardt. Another was water type as promoted by Alexander William Williamson. Jean-Baptiste Dumas and Auguste Laurent (an early supporter of radical theory) challenged radical theory in 1840 with a Law of Substitution (or Theory of Substitution). This law acknowledged that any hydrogen atom even as part of a radical could be substituted by a halogen.

Eventually Frankland in 1852 and August Kekulé in 1857 introduced valence theory with the tetravalency of carbon as its central theme, making trivalent carbon obsolete for the time being.

== Legacy ==
In 1900 Moses Gomberg unexpectedly discovered true trivalent carbon and the first radical in the modern sense of the word in his (unsuccessful) attempt to make hexaphenylethane. In current organic chemistry, concepts such as benzoyl and acetyl persist in chemical nomenclature but only to identify a functional group having the same fragment.
