= Electrochemical dualism =

Obsolete scientific theory

Electrochemical dualism is an obsolete scientific theory in chemistry relevant between around 1800 and around 1830 and pioneered by Jöns Jacob Berzelius. The theory held that all molecules are salts composed of basic and acidic oxides. The compound potassium sulphate for example was viewed as a salt of K_{2}O and SO_{3}. Berzelius based his theory on investigations he conducted in collaboration with Wilhelm Hisinger on certain salts with the newly discovered voltaic pile. They observed that many compounds could be decomposed by an electric current in an acidic component at the positive pole and a basic component at the negative pole. The theory was ultimately challenged and made redundant by radical theory.
