= Codan A/S =

Danish insurance company

Codan A/S (named after latin:Sinus Codanus; Baltic Sea) is a Danish insurance company, which was founded in 1916. The company is Scandinavia's third largest insurance company and operates also the company Trygg-Hansa in Sweden, and the group operates in the Baltic states and Norway.

In Denmark, Codan concentrate on non-life insurance after having sold its life and pension insurance to the Swedish banking group SEB in 2004. The company has also previously operated bank activity, which also was sold to SEB in 1999.

Since 1984 Codan has been partially owned by the British insurance company Royal & SunAlliance however, it has since been completely taken over. In 1993 Codan took over the bankrupt Hafnia Insurance. Codan has previously been listed on Copenhagen Stock Exchange, but was delisted in July 2007.

== See also ==
- Codanus sinus
