= Torrid zone =

Equatorial region thought uninhabitable

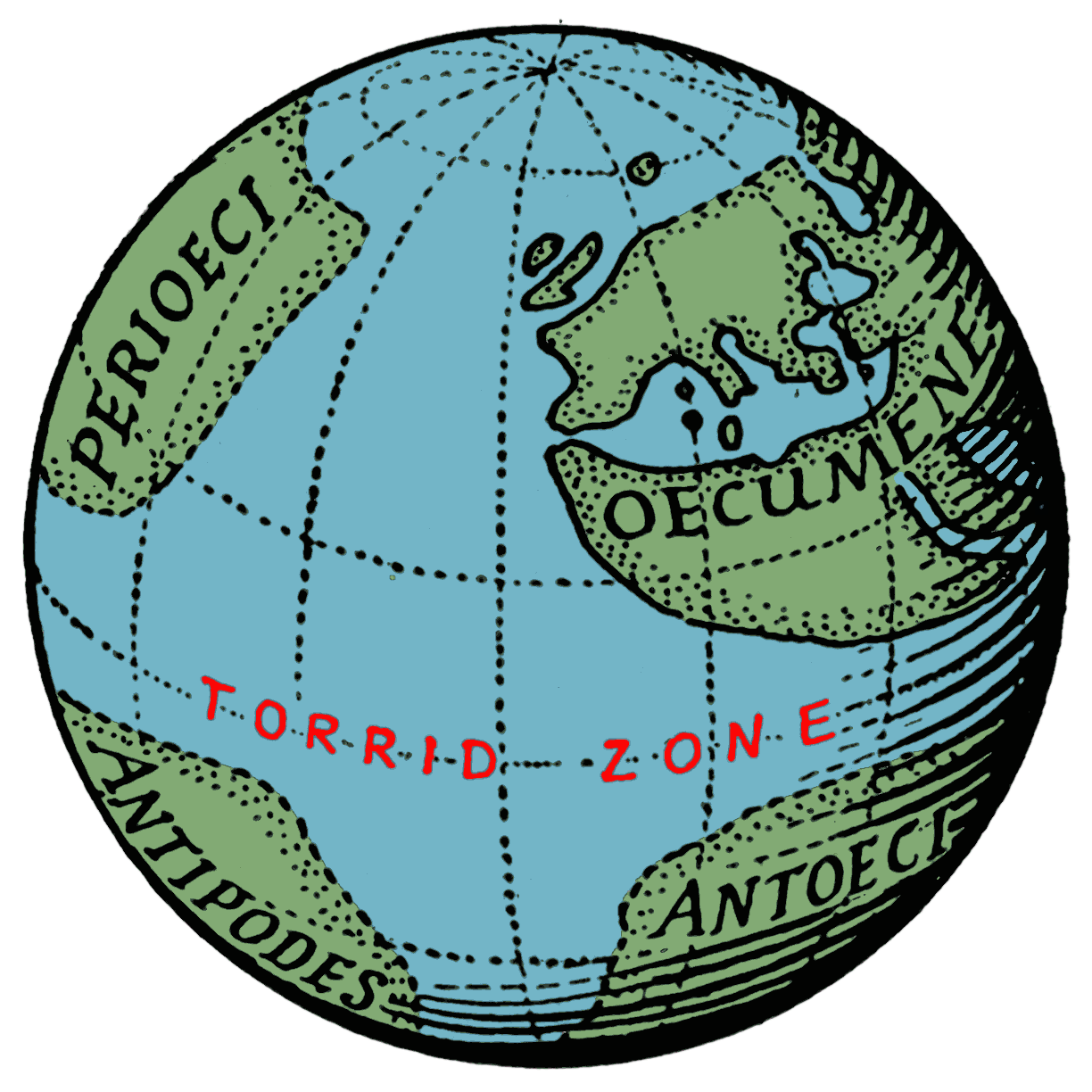
The Terrestrial Sphere of Crates of Mallus (c. 150 BCE), showing land masses in both the northern and southern hemispheres of the western hemisphere

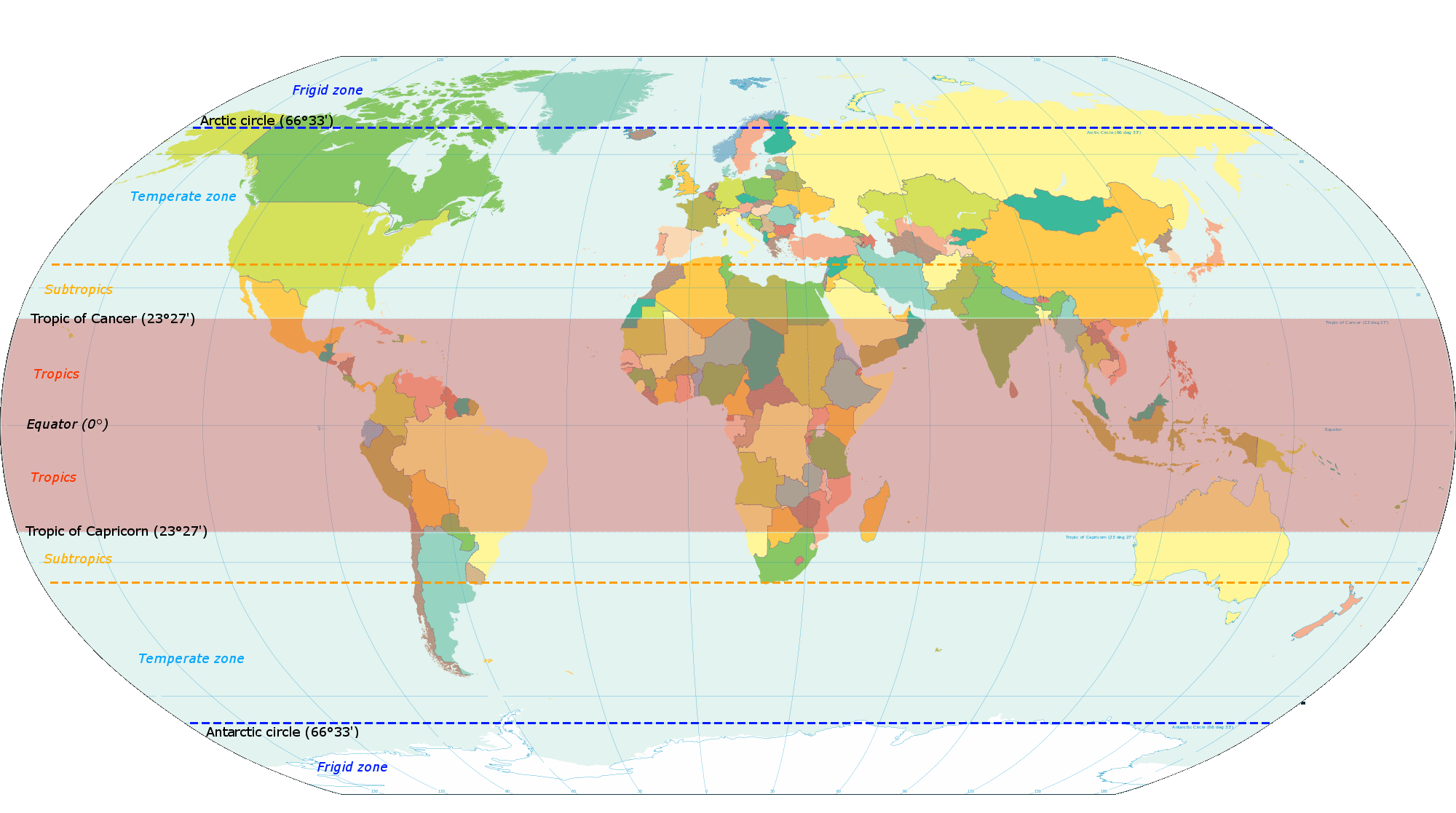
Modern world map with the intertropical zone highlighted in crimson

The torrid zone was the name given by ancient Greek and Roman geographers to the equatorial area of the Earth, so hot that it was thought to be impenetrable to sailors or explorers. That notion became a deterrent for European explorers until the 15th century and the notion that the torrid zone was uninhabitable was disproved by the 16th century.

== Early theories and origins ==
Aristotle, like all classical thinkers, knew that the world was a sphere. He posited that the western half of the temperate zone on the other side of the globe from Greece might be habitable and that, because of symmetry, there must be in the Southern Hemisphere a temperate zone corresponding to that in the northern. He thought, however, that the excessive heat in the torrid zone would prevent exploration.

The torrid zone was an explanation of Earth's climate based on observation and natural reasoning by thinkers such as Aristotle and Parmenides. The creation of the torrid zone is often associated with Parmenides though later works such as Posidonius's Treatise on Oceanus. The torrid zone was a part of Parmenides' five climatic zones placing the torrid zone around the equator, also defining it by extreme heat; however, Parmenides' original work on the torrid zone did not survive.

Aristotle further developed the torrid zone in his Meteorologica, where he used natural philosophy to explain the Northern and Southern winds, and he believed the torrid zone was large and open, with no vegetation or possibility for habitation. Aristotle thought the southern winds did not originate from the poles but from a hot, flat, central region, and thus the torrid zone is Aristotles explanation.

Strabo referred to:

the meridian through Syene is drawn approximately along the course of the Nile from Meroë to Alexandria, and this distance is about ten thousand stadia [~1,800 km]; and Syene must lie in the centre of that distance; so that the distance from Syene to Meroë is five thousand stadia [~900 km]. And when you have proceeded about three thousand stadia [~550 km] in a straight line south of Meroë, the country is no longer inhabitable on account of the heat, and therefore the parallel though these regions, being the same as that through the Cinnamon-producing Country, must be put down as the limit and the beginning of our inhabited world on the South.

In 8 AD the poet Ovid wrote in his Metamorphoses.

...the celestial vault is cut by two zones on the right and two on the left, and there is a fifth zone between, hotter than these [i.e., the Milky Way], so did the providence of God mark off the enclosed mass with the same number of zones, and the same tracts were stamped upon the earth. The central zone of these may not be dwelt in by reason of the heat

Pomponius Mela, the first Roman geographer, asserted that the Earth had two habitable zones, a north and a south one. The second population were known as Antichthones. However, it would be impossible to get into contact with each other because of the unbearable heat at the equator (De situ orbis 1.4). The term torrid is from Latin torridus, "burned, parched."

== Proved wrong ==
Many Europeans had assumed that Cape Bojador, in Western Sahara, marked the beginning of the impenetrable torrid zone until 1434, when the Portuguese sailed past the cape and reported that no torrid zone existed.

Further observation and exploration during the sixteenth century completely disproved the existence of an uninhabitable torrid zone. Firsthand reports from Spanish Conquistadors and explorers, combined with those of missionaries in Peru who crossed into the torrid zone, found it to be both habitable and fruitful, with complex weather patterns that disprove Aristotle's and early theories' claims that the torrid zone is hot and dry. The newly discovered Americas were a complete contrast to the early perceptions about the torrid zone, as the Americas, which lie within it, have complex weather patterns and are inhabited by humans, thereby disproving early theories about the torrid zone.

== Cultural and historical significance ==
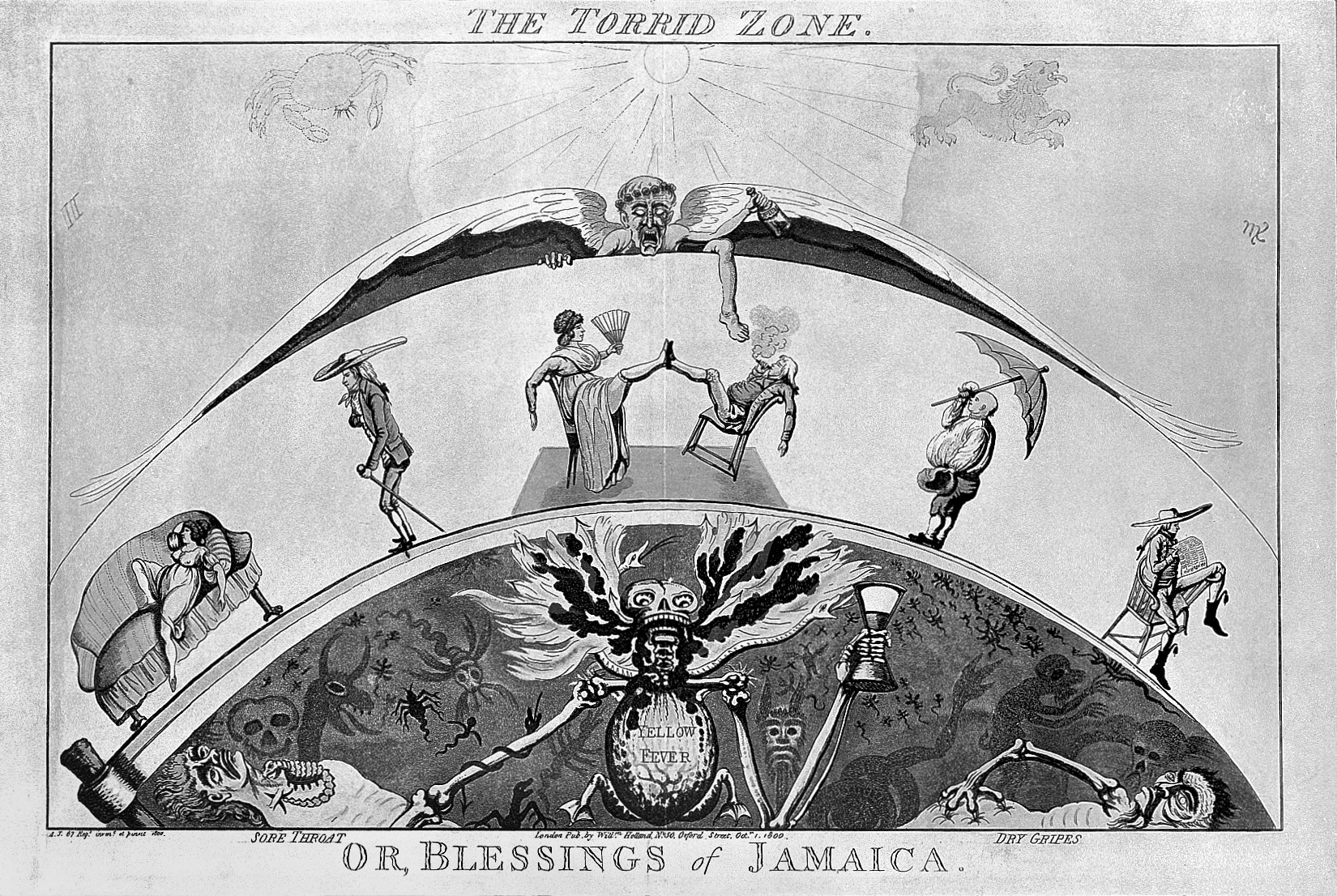
Characterizations of fears associated with the once thought uninhabitable torrid zone or "Blessings of Jamaica"

Beyond the scientific development of the torrid zone, early European assumptions about it persisted even after it was scientifically disproven. Imperialist ideals helped to establish the importance of environmental determinism in European records. The torrid zone, once it was discovered to be tropical and habitable was portrayed by European scholars as primitive and savage as compared to themselves.

Early assumptions about the torrid zone, once developed through empirical research, were later categorized as the tropics, which were characterized by both positive and negative views that range from exotic, paradise, rich and lush to dangerous, savage, and primitive. The way Europeans depicted the discovery of the tropics and their representation of them justified colonial expansion and helped establish racial divisions, placing Europeans above the indigenous peoples of the tropical regions.
