= Pomponius Mela =

1st-century AD Roman geographer

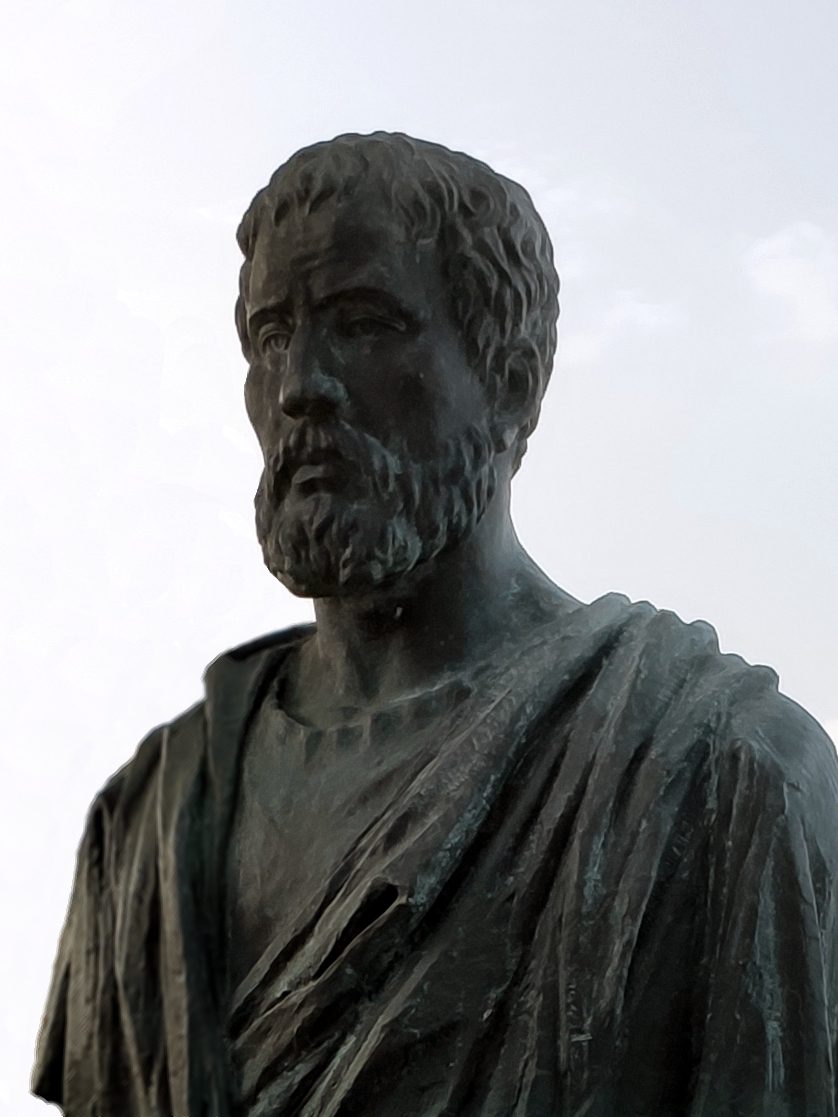
Statue of Pomponius Mela in Ceuta, Spain, erected 2009

Pomponius Mela (died c. AD 45) was the earliest known Roman geographer. He was born at the end of the 1st century BC in Tingentera (now Algeciras), wrote around AD 43, and died circa AD 45.

His short work (De situ orbis libri III.) remained in use nearly to the year 1500. It occupies less than one hundred pages of ordinary print, and is described by the Encyclopædia Britannica (1911) as "dry in style and deficient in method, but of pure Latinity, and occasionally relieved by pleasing word-pictures." Except for the geographical parts of Pliny's Historia naturalis (where Mela is cited as an important authority), the De situ orbis is the only formal treatise on the subject in Classical Latin.

== Biography ==
Reconstruction of Pomponius Mela's world map by Konrad Miller (1898)

Little is known of Pomponius except his name and birthplace—the small town of Tingentera or Cingentera (identified as Iulia Traducta) in southern Spain, on Algeciras Bay (Mela ii. 6, § 96; but the text is here corrupt). The date of his writing may be approximately fixed by his allusion (iii. 6 § 49) to a proposed British expedition of the reigning emperor, almost certainly that of Claudius in AD 43. That this passage cannot refer to Julius Caesar is evidenced by several references to events of Augustus's reign; especially to certain new names given to Spanish towns. Mela, like the two Senecas, Lucan, Martial, Quintilian, Trajan, Hadrian, were all part of Italic communities settled in various parts of Spain that eventually relocated in Rome. It has been conjectured that Pomponius Mela may have been related in some way to Marcus Annaeus Mela, son of Seneca the Elder and father of Lucan.

== Geographical knowledge ==
The general views of the De situ orbis mainly agree with those current among Greek writers from Eratosthenes to Strabo, though the latter was probably unknown to Mela. But Pomponius is unique among ancient geographers in that, after dividing the Earth into five zones, of which two only were habitable, he asserts the existence of antichthones, inhabiting the southern temperate zone inaccessible to the folk of the northern temperate regions due to the unbearable heat of the intervening torrid zone. On the divisions and boundaries of Europe, Asia and Africa, he repeats Eratosthenes; like all classical geographers from Alexander the Great (except Ptolemy) he regards the Caspian Sea as an inlet of the Northern Ocean, corresponding to the Persian and Arabian (Red Sea) gulfs on the south.

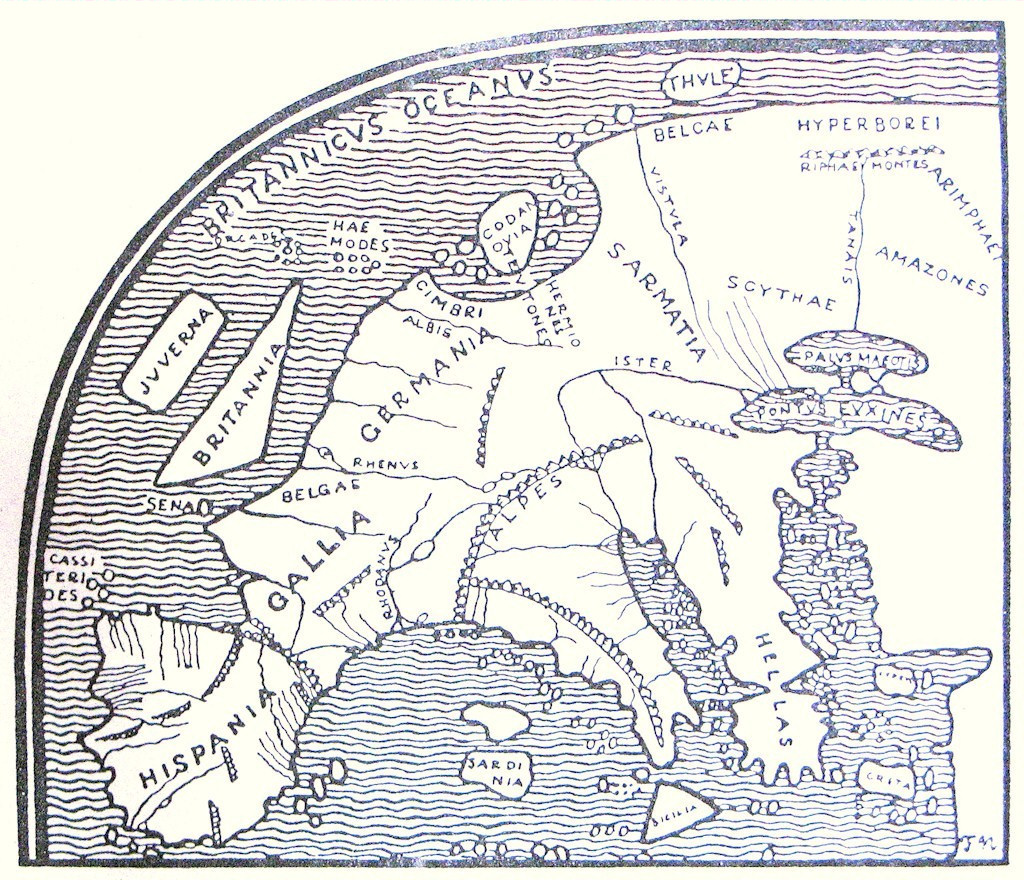
Pomponius Mela's description of Europe (F. Nansen, 1911)

His Indian conceptions are inferior to those of some earlier Greek writers; he follows Eratosthenes in supposing that country to occupy the south-eastern angle of Asia, whence the coast trended northwards to Scythia, and then swept round westward to the Caspian Sea. As usual, he places the Riphean Mountains and the Hyperboreans near the Scythian Ocean. In western Europe his knowledge (as was natural in a Spanish subject of Imperial Rome) was somewhat in advance of the Greek geographers. He defines the western coastline of Spain and Gaul and its indentation by the Bay of Biscay more accurately than Eratosthenes or Strabo, and his ideas of the British Isles and their position are also clearer than his predecessors. He is the first to name the Orcades or Orkney Islands, which he defines and locates fairly correctly. Of northern Europe his knowledge was imperfect, but he speaks of a great bay ("Codanus sinus") to the north of Germany, among whose many islands was one, "Codanovia", of pre-eminent size; this name reappears in Pliny the Elder's work as Scatinavia. Codanovia and Scatinavia were both Latin renderings of the Proto-Germanic *Skaðinawio, the Germanic name for Scandinavia.

=== Descriptive method ===
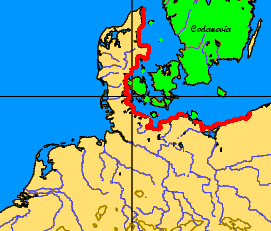
The shores of Codanus sinus (southwestern Baltic Sea) in red with its many islands in green

Mela's descriptive method follows ocean coasts, in the manner of a periplus, probably because it was derived from the accounts of navigators. He begins at the Straits of Gibraltar, and describes the countries adjoining the south coast of the Mediterranean; then he moves round by Syria and Asia Minor to the Black Sea, and so returns to Spain along the north shore of the Euxine, Propontis, etc. After treating the Mediterranean islands, he next takes the ocean littoral—to west, north, east and south successively—from Spain and Gaul round to India, from India to Persia, Arabia and Ethiopia; and so again works back to Spain. Like most classical geographers he conceives of the continent of Africa as surrounded by sea and not extending very far south.

== Editions ==
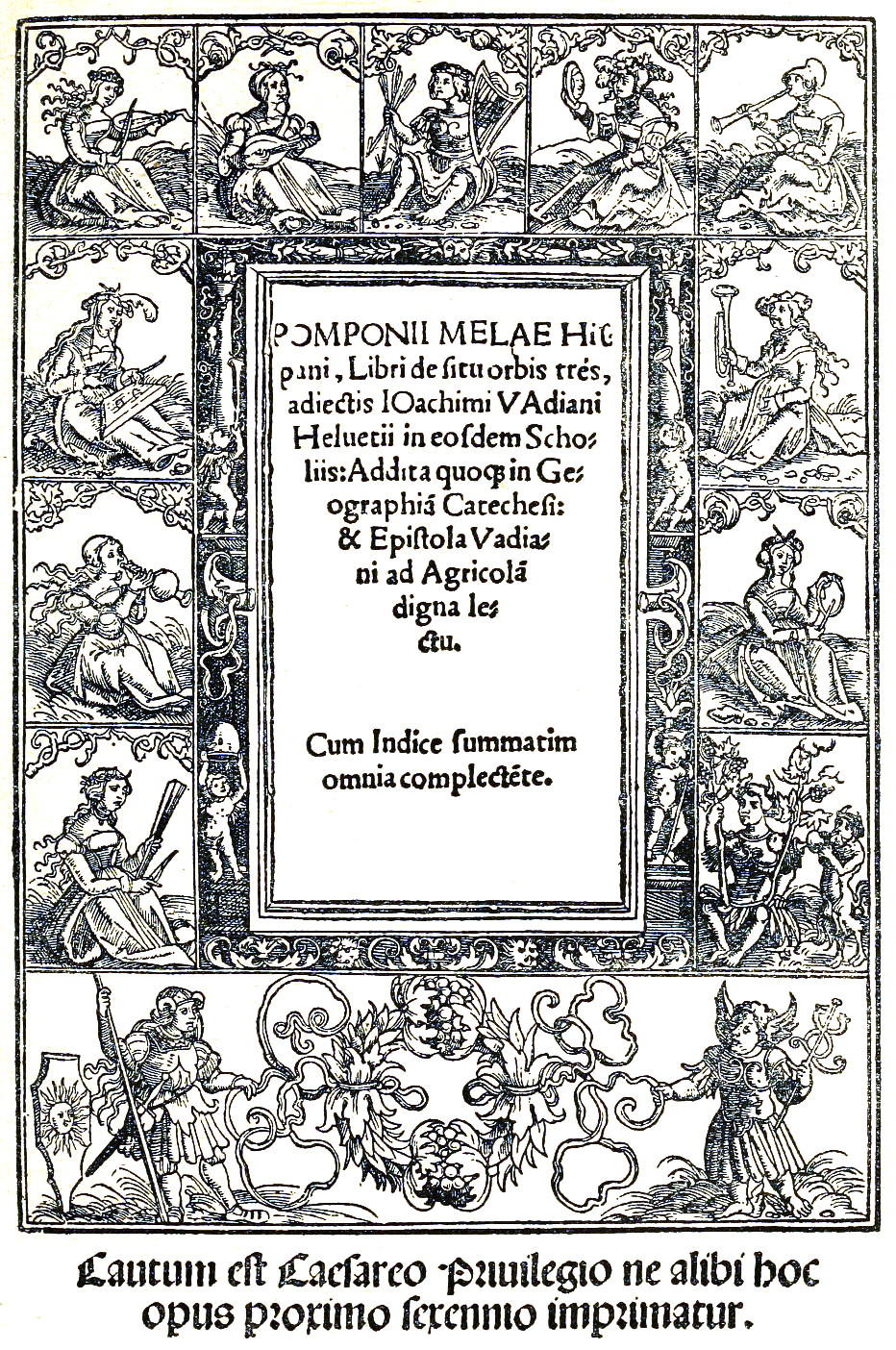
Title page of 1518 Vadian's first edition

The editio princeps of Mela was published at Milan in 1471; the first critical edition was by Joachim Vadian (Wien, 1518), superseded by those of Johann Heinrich Voss (1658), Johann Friedrich Gronovius (1685 and 1696), A. Gronovius (1722 and 1728), and Tzschucke (1806–1807), in seven parts (Leipzig; the most elaborate of all); G. Paithey's (Berlin, 1867) for its text. The English translation by Arthur Golding (1585) was celebrated.

A recent English translation is that of F. E. Romer, originally published in 1998.

- I tre libri di Pomponio Mela del sito, forma, e misura del mondo (in Italian). Venezia: Gabriele Giolito de Ferrari. 1557.

== Sources ==
- Romer, Frank E. (1998). Pomponius Mela's Description of the World. Ann Arbor: University of Michigan Press. ISBN 9780472084524.
- Editions in the original Latin in the Internet Archive
- Books I, II and III in Latin, digitised at The Latin Library

Attribution
