= Traité Élémentaire de Chimie =

Book by Antoine Lavoisier

Traité élémentaire de chimie
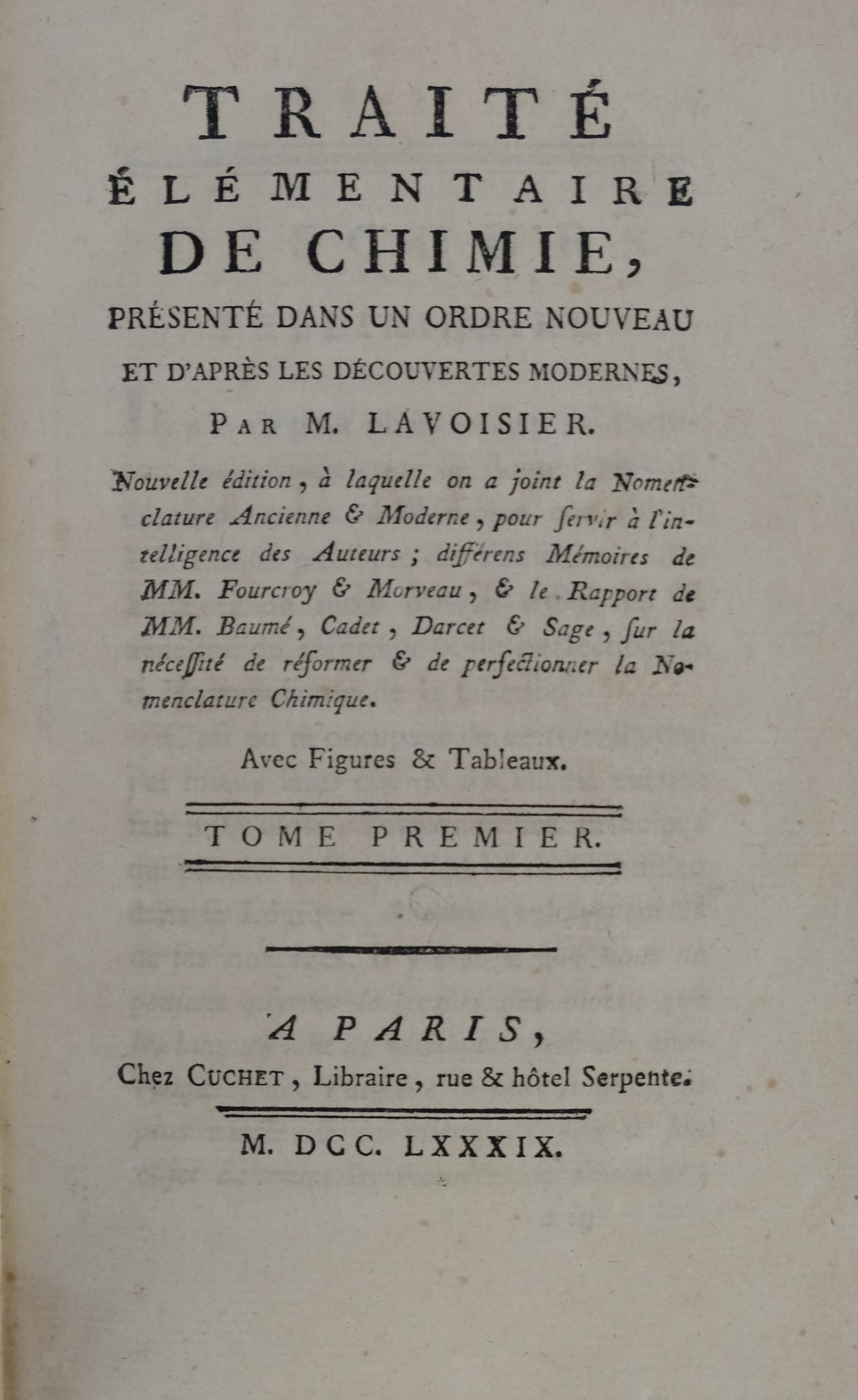
- Author: Antoine Lavoisier
- Translator: Robert Kerr
- Language: French
- Genre: Textbook; Science
- Publication date: 1789
- Publication place: France
- English publication date: 1790

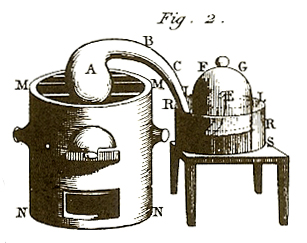
A diagram from the book

Traité élémentaire de chimie is a textbook written by Antoine Lavoisier published in 1789 and translated into English by Robert Kerr in 1790 under the title Elements of Chemistry in a New Systematic Order containing All the Modern Discoveries. It is considered to be the first modern chemical textbook.

The book defines an element as a single substance that can't be broken down by chemical analysis and from which all chemical compounds are formed, publishing his discovery that fermentation produces carbon dioxide (carbonic gas) and spirit of wine, saying that it is "more appropriately called by the Arabic word alcohol since it is formed from cider or fermented sugar as well as wine", and publishing the first chemical equation "grape must = carbonic acid + alcohol", calling this reaction "one of the most extraordinary in chemistry", noting "In these experiments, we have to assume that there is a true balance or equation between the elements of the compounds with which we start and those obtained at the end of the chemical reaction."

The book contains 33 elements, only 23 of which are elements in the modern sense. The elements given by Lavoisier are: light, caloric, oxygen, azote (nitrogen), hydrogen, sulphur, phosphorous (phosphorus), charcoal, muriatic radical (chloride), fluoric radical (fluoride), boracic radical, antimony, arsenic, bismuth, cobalt, copper, gold, iron, lead, manganese, mercury, molybdena (molybdenite), nickel, platina (platinum), silver, tin, tungstein (tungsten), zinc, lime, magnesia (magnesium), barytes (baryte), argill (clay or earth of alum), and silex.

The law of conservation of mass, which in France is taught as Lavoisier's Law, is paraphrased in the phrase "Rien ne se perd, rien ne se crée, tout se transforme." ("Nothing is lost, nothing is created, everything is transformed.")

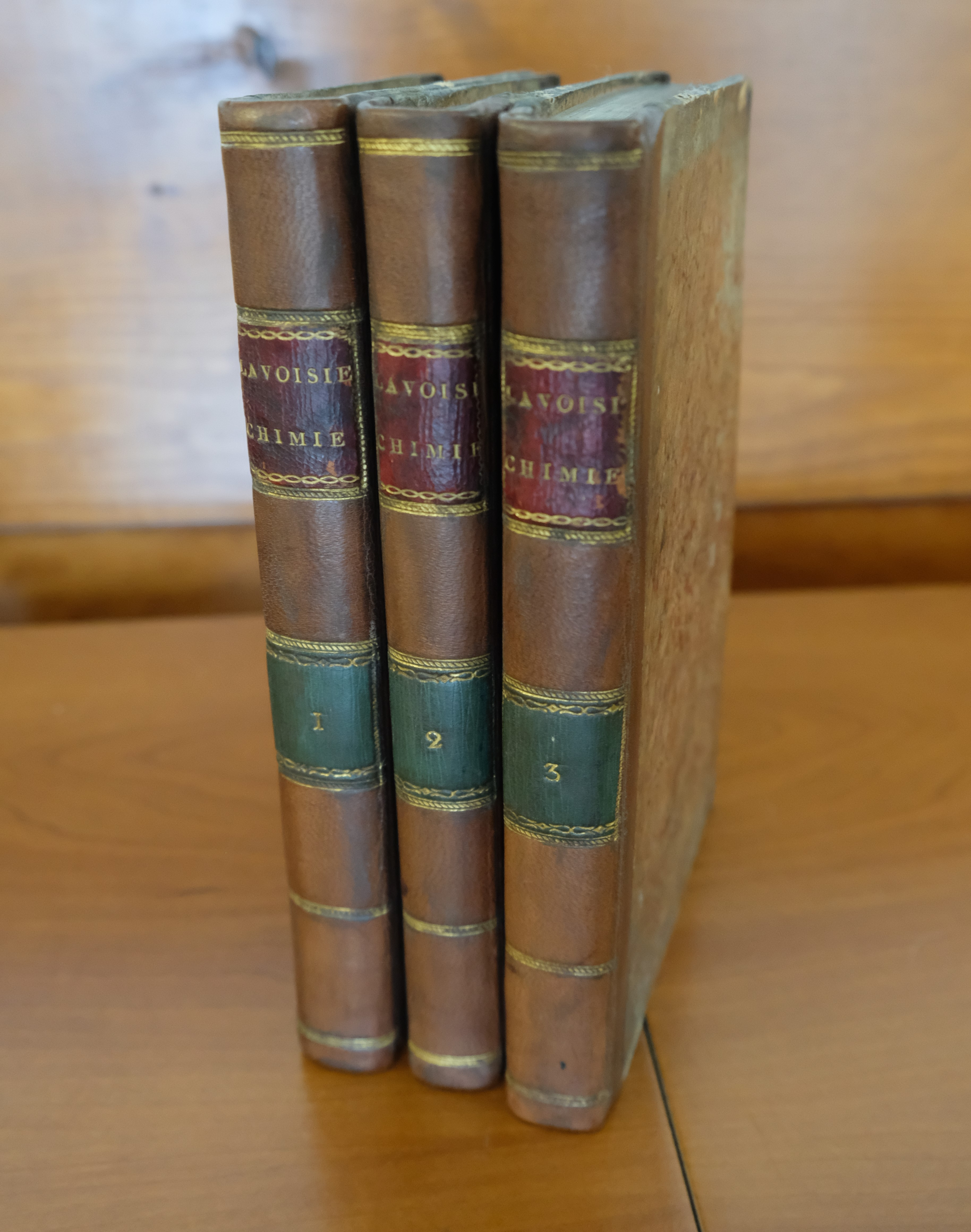
Volumes I-III of "Traité élémentaire de Chimie" (1789)

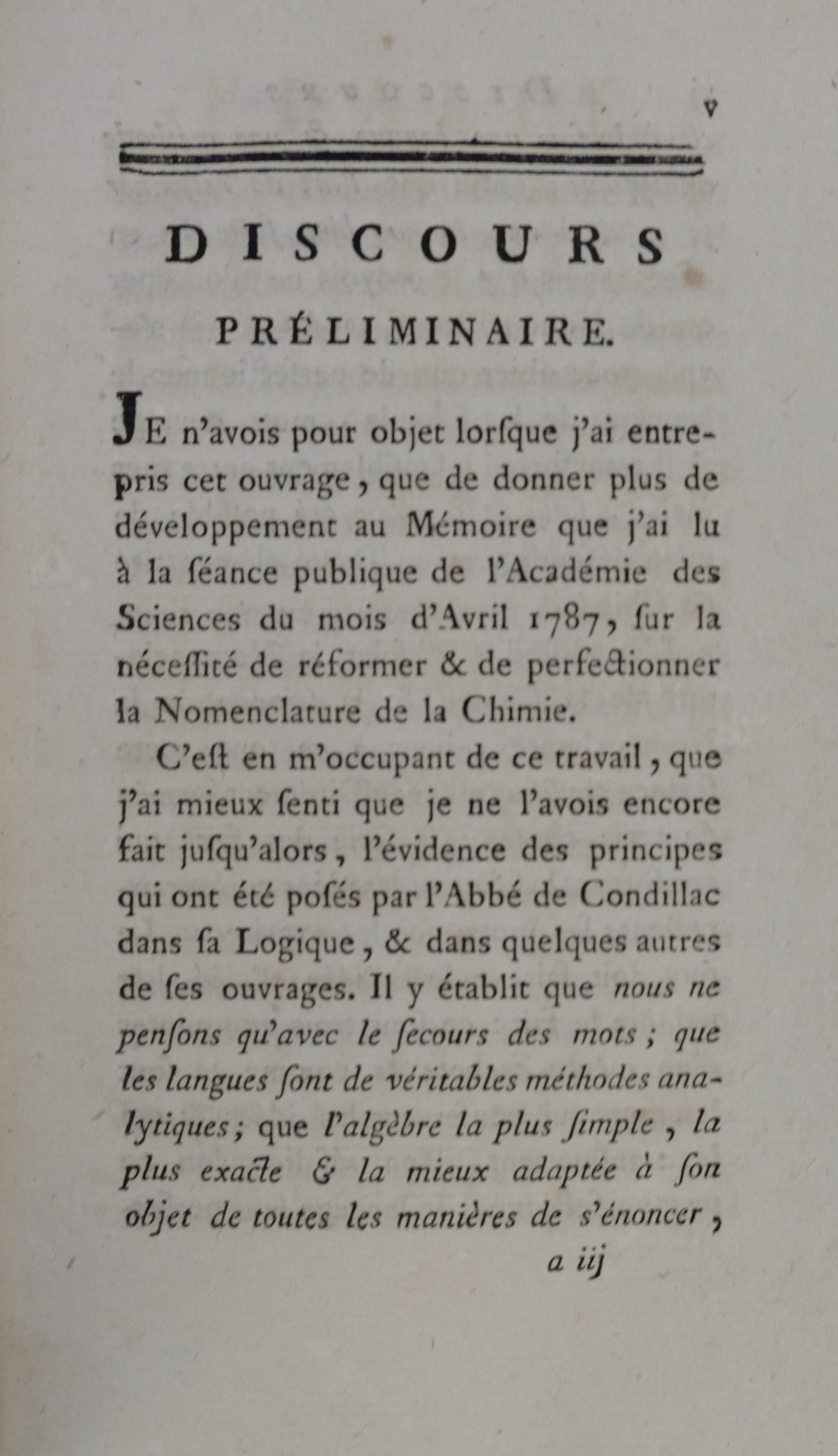
Discours préliminaire to volume I of "Traité élémentaire de Chimie" (1789)

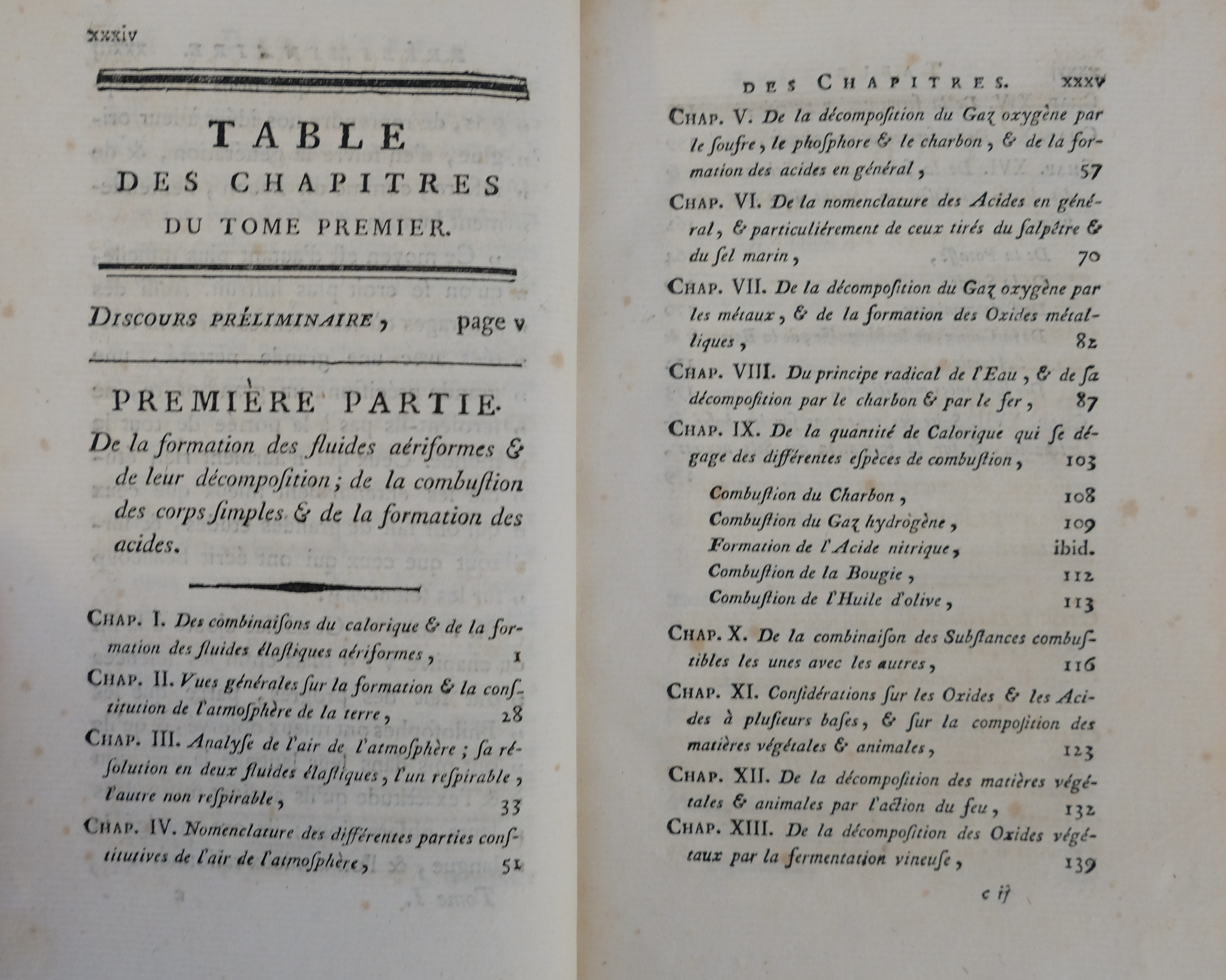
Table of contents to volume I of "Traité élémentaire de Chimie" (1789)

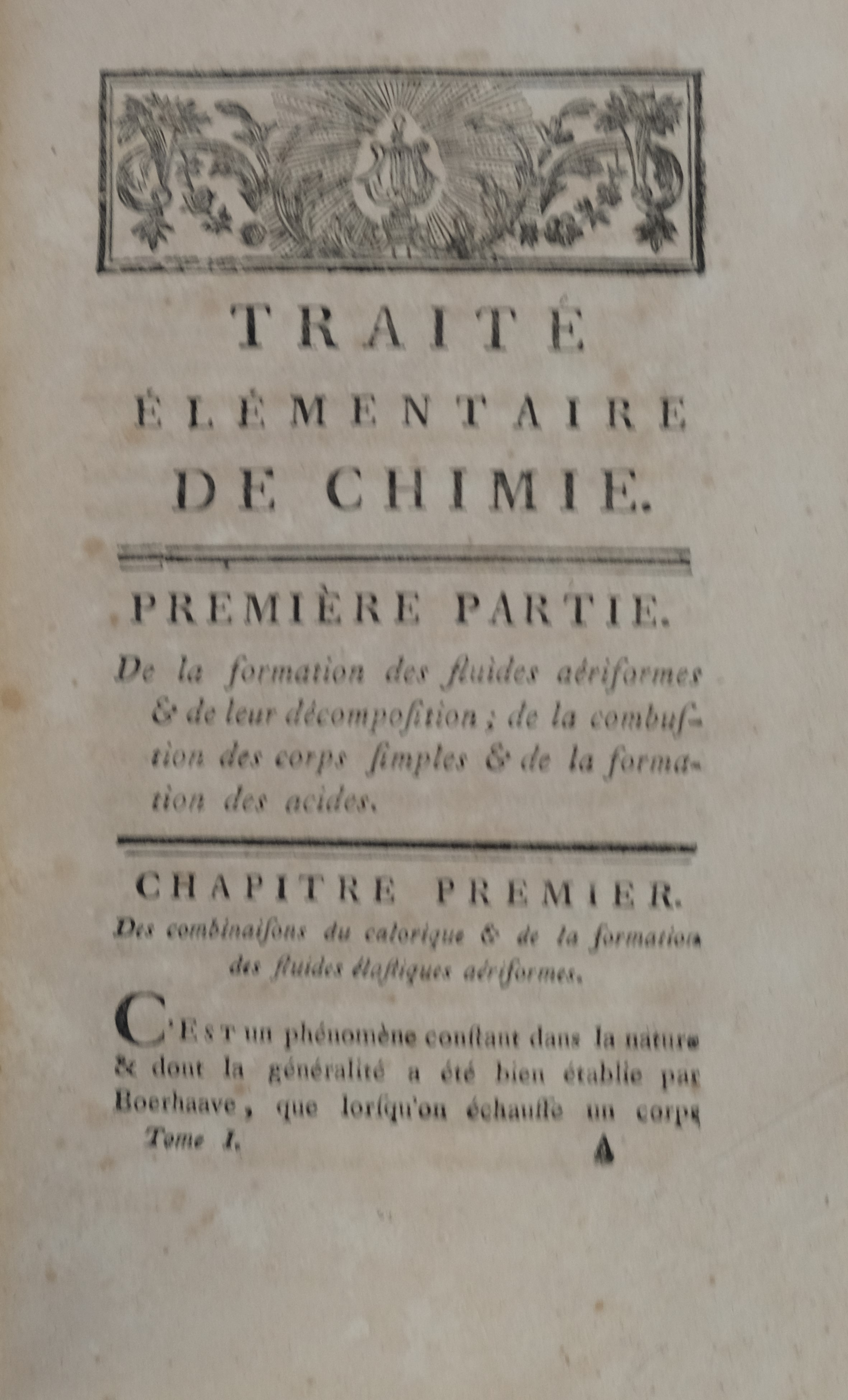
First page of volume I of "Traité élémentaire de Chimie" (1789)

== See also ==
- The Sceptical Chymist by Robert Boyle

== Notes ==
=== Works cited ===
- Lavoisier, Antoine (1790), Elements of Chemistry in New Systematic Order, Containing All Modern Discoveries, Illustrated with 13 Copperplates, translated from the French by Robert Kerr (1 ed.), Edinburgh: William Creech
