= Codanus sinus =

Latin name of the Baltic Sea and Kattegat

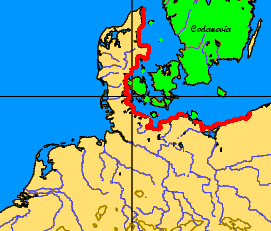
Codanus sinus with its many islands

The Codanus sinus is the Latin name of the Baltic Sea and Kattegat.

Pomponius Mela (3.31, 3.54) and Pliny the Elder (4.96) describe it as an "enormous bay" lying beyond the Elbe", with "many small islands", the largest one being Scandinavia (Codannovia in Pomponius Mela). It is commonly identified with the Baltic Sea, which is otherwise rendered in Latin as Mare Balticum. Pliny believed that Scandinavia was an island, possibly because its attachment to Europe was too remote and unknown for Pliny to have known about.

The origin of the name is obscure. One rendering of Scandinavia into Latin was "Codanovia", with old Latin tending to lose initial s before another consonant (as in nix, "snow"), and the shortened form Codanus could therefore similarly refer to Scania in southern Sweden.
