= Qantas fleet =

Aircraft operated by Qantas

Qantas operates a fleet of Airbus A321XLR, Airbus A330, Airbus A380, Boeing 737 and Boeing 787 aircraft. This list excludes aircraft from subsidiaries Qantas Freight, QantasLink and Jetstar.

== Current fleet ==
As of November 2026, Qantas operates the following mainline aircraft:

Qantas fleet
| Aircraft | In service | Orders | Passengers | | | | | | Notes |
| Aircraft | In service | Orders | F | J | W | Y | Total | Ref. | Notes |
|---|---|---|---|---|---|---|---|---|---|
| Airbus A321XLR | 3 | — | — | 20 | — | 180 | 200 | | Order with 65 options across the Airbus A220 and A320neo family. Domestic configuration, replacing Boeing 737-800. |
| Airbus A321XLR | 4 | 26 | — | 20 | — | 177 | 197 | | Order with 65 options across the Airbus A220 and A320neo family. Domestic configuration, replacing Boeing 737-800. |
| Airbus A321XLR | — | 16 | TBA | | | | | | To be fitted with lie-flat business class seats and seat-back entertainment screens, deliveries to begin in 2028. International configuration, replacing Boeing 737-800. |
| Airbus A330-200 | 8 | — | — | 27 | — | 224 | 251 | | Six to be retired and replaced by Boeing 787 aircraft from 2027. 10 aircraft to have cabins retrofitted from 2025. |
| Airbus A330-200 | 8 | — | — | 28 | — | 243 | 271 | | Six to be retired and replaced by Boeing 787 aircraft from 2027. 10 aircraft to have cabins retrofitted from 2025. |
| Airbus A330-300 | 10 | — | — | 28 | — | 269 | 297 | | To be retired and replaced by Airbus A350-1000 from 2028. |
| Airbus A330-300 | 3 | — | — | 28 | 21 | 230 | 279 | | Two aircraft dry-leased from Finnair for up to three years beginning in October 2025. VH-QPM purchased outright from Finnair |
| Airbus A350-1000 | — | 12 | TBA | | | | | | Deliveries to begin in FY29; Replacing Airbus A330-300. |
| Airbus A350-1000ULR | — | 12 | 6 | 52 | 40 | 140 | 238 | | Deliveries to begin in April 2027. To be used for Project Sunrise routes. |
| Airbus A380-800 | 10 | — | 14 | 70 | 60 | 341 | 485 | | To be retired from 2028. To be replaced by Boeing 787 & Airbus A350, up to 20 aircraft to be ordered. |
| Boeing 737-800 | 74 | — | — | 12 | — | 156 | 168 | | To be retired and replaced by Airbus A321XLR, with the first withdrawals from late 2026. 42 aircraft to have cabins retrofitted from 2027. |
| Boeing 737-800 | 4 | — | — | 12 | — | 150 | 162 | | Former Singapore Airlines aircraft |
| Boeing 787-9 | 14 | 4 | — | 42 | 28 | 166 | 236 | | Four additional aircraft ordered in August 2023, to be delivered from FY28; Replacing Airbus A330-200. |
| Boeing 787-10 | — | 8 | TBA | | | | | | Deliveries to begin in FY31; Replacing Airbus A330-300. |
| Total | 138 | 78 | | | | | | | |

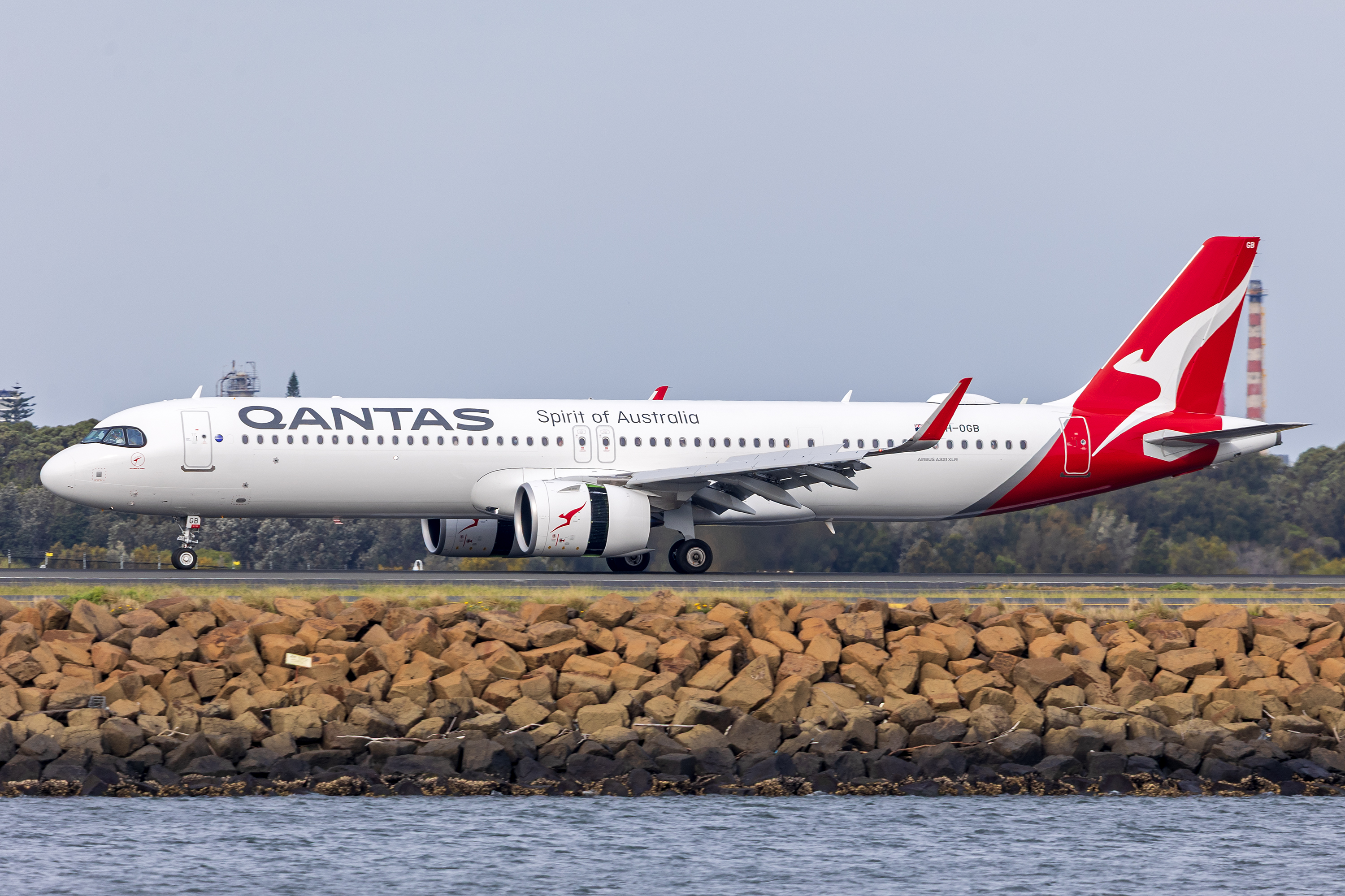
Airbus A321XLR

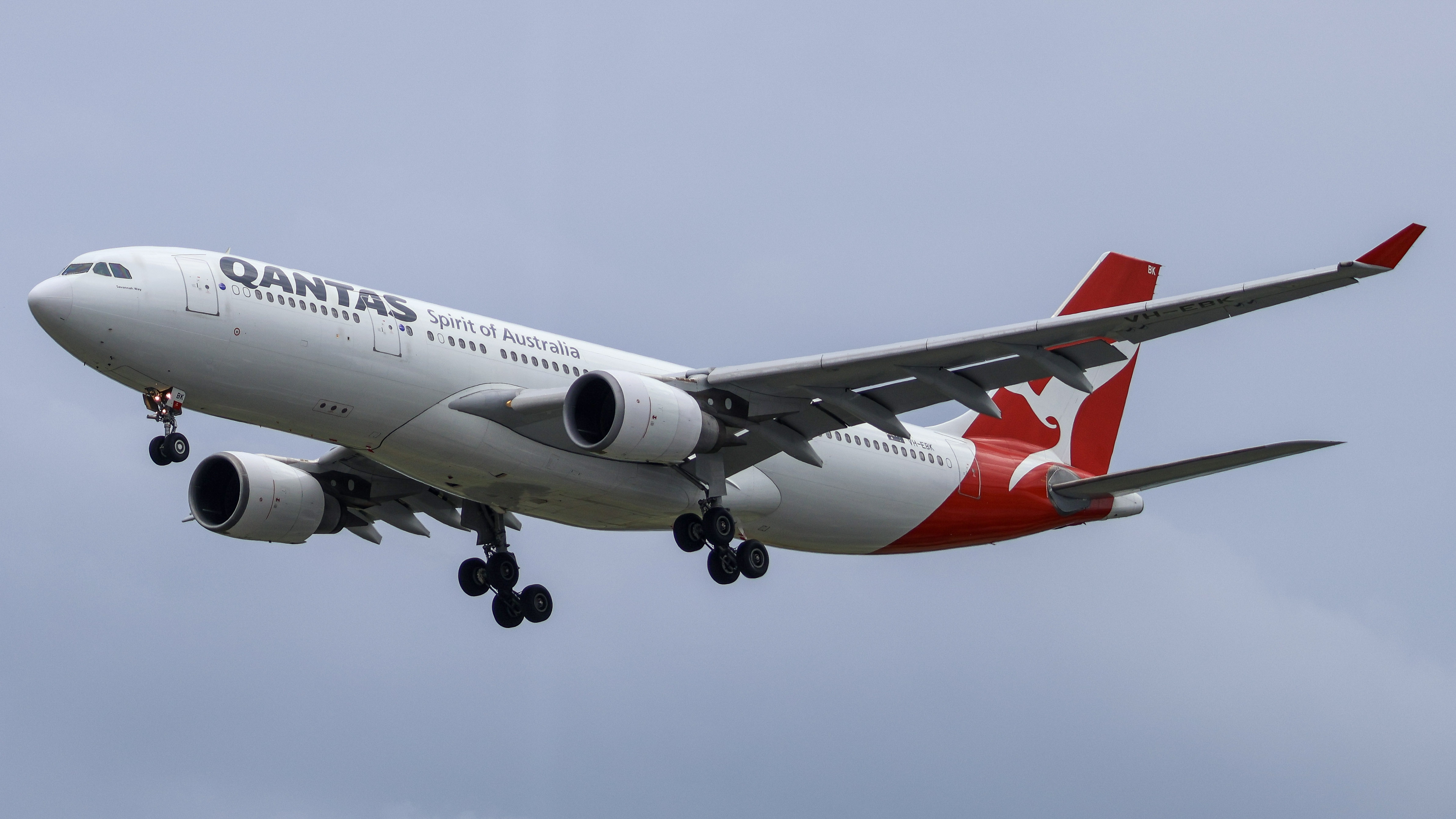
Airbus A330-200

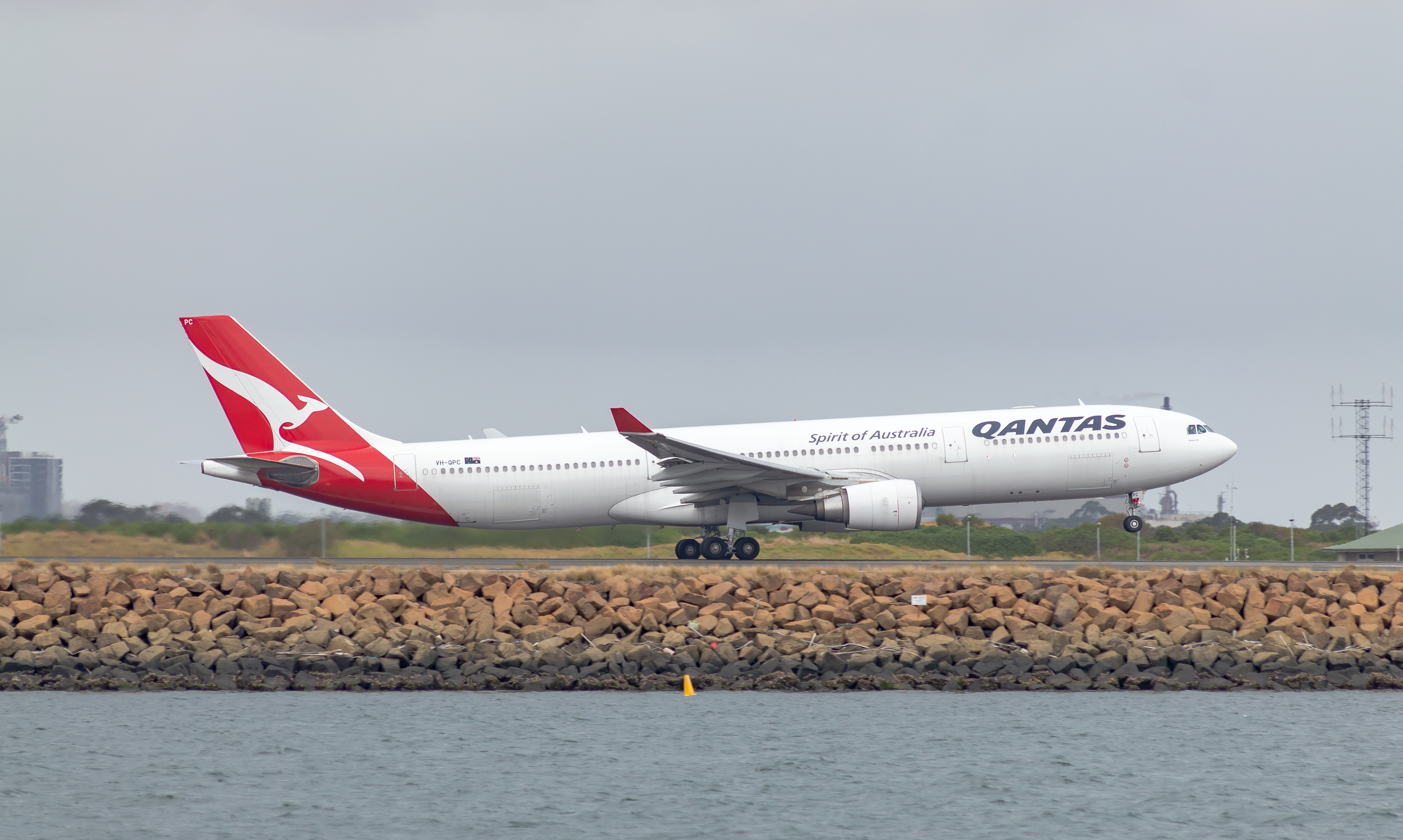
Airbus A330-300

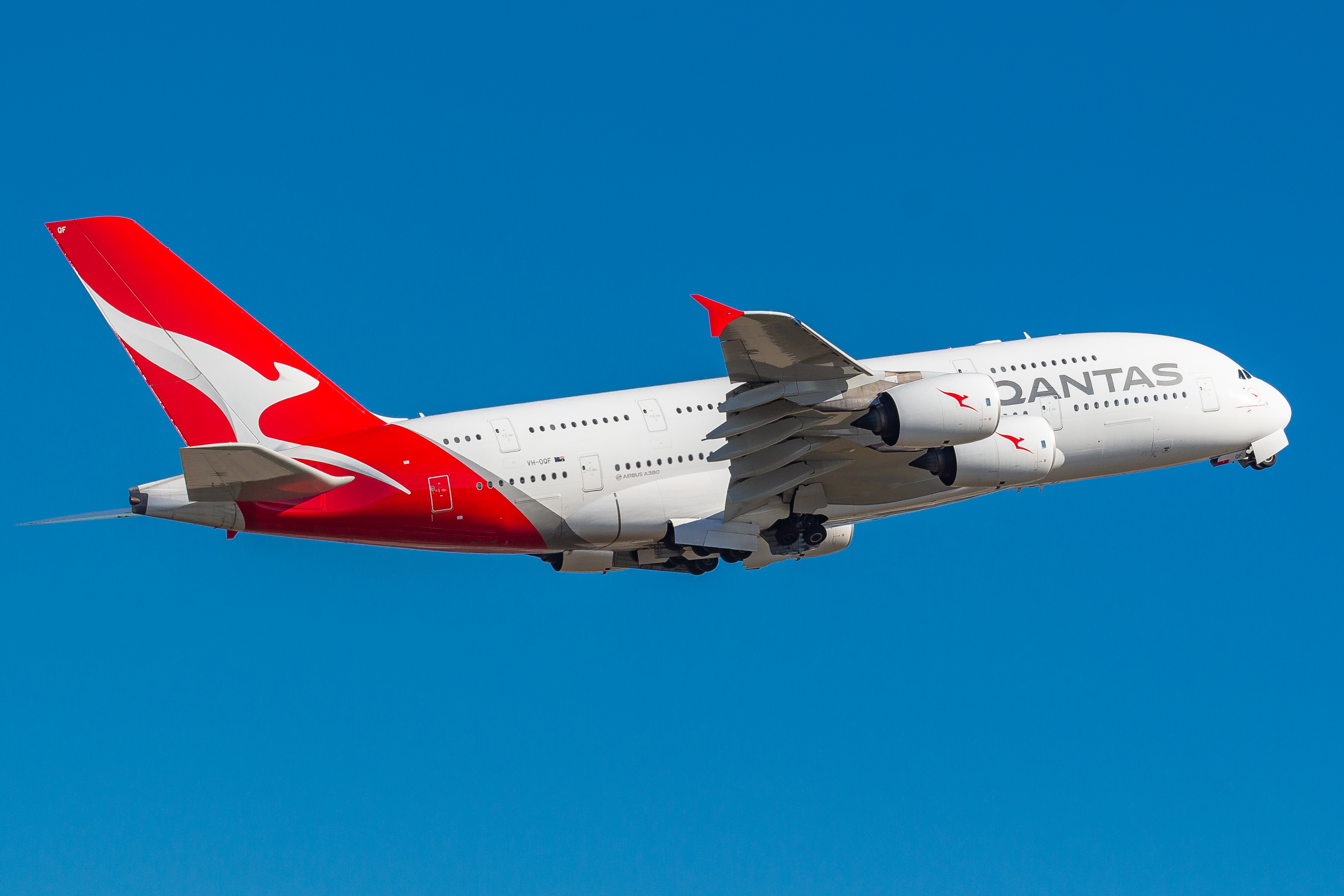
Airbus A380-800

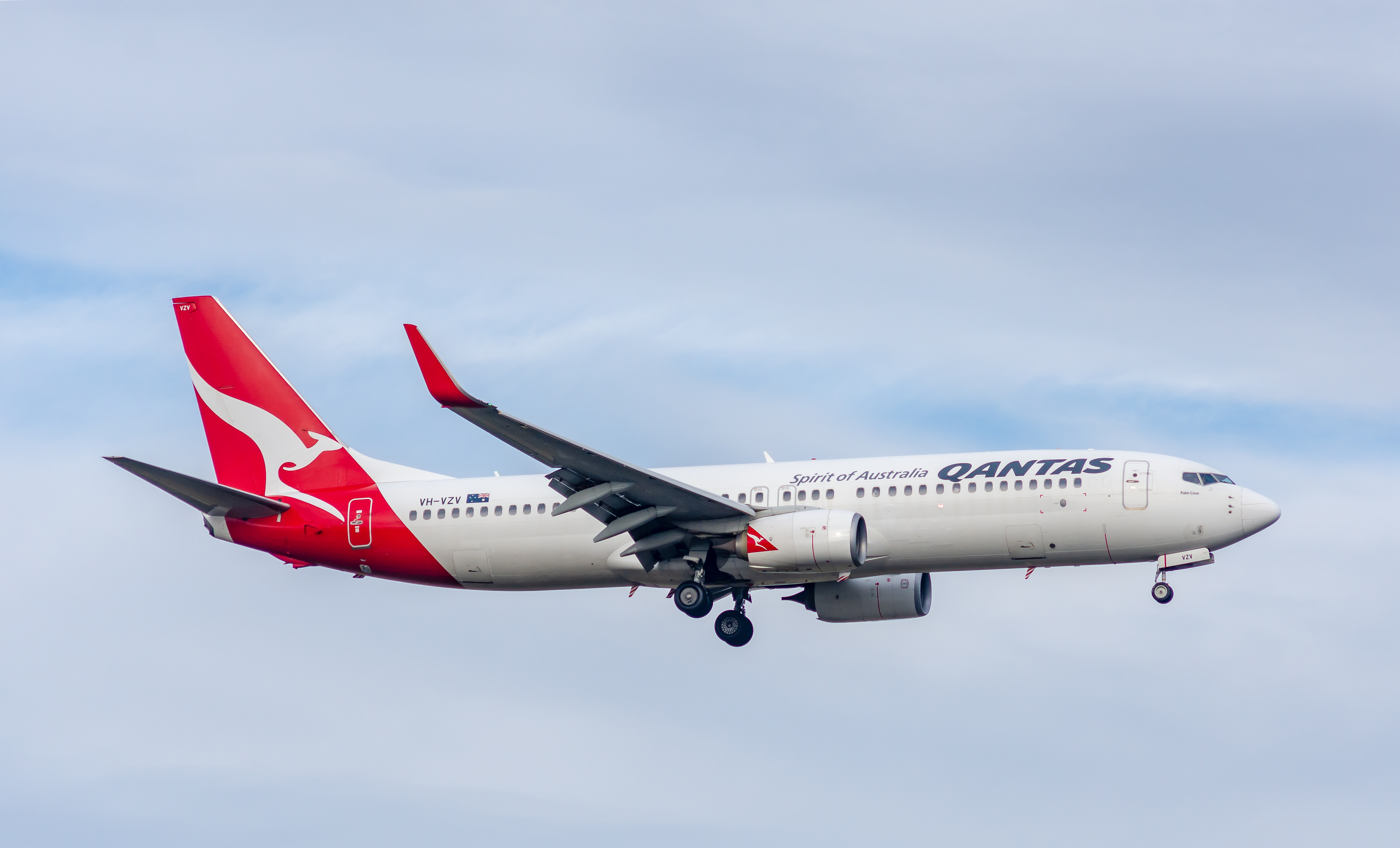
Boeing 737-800

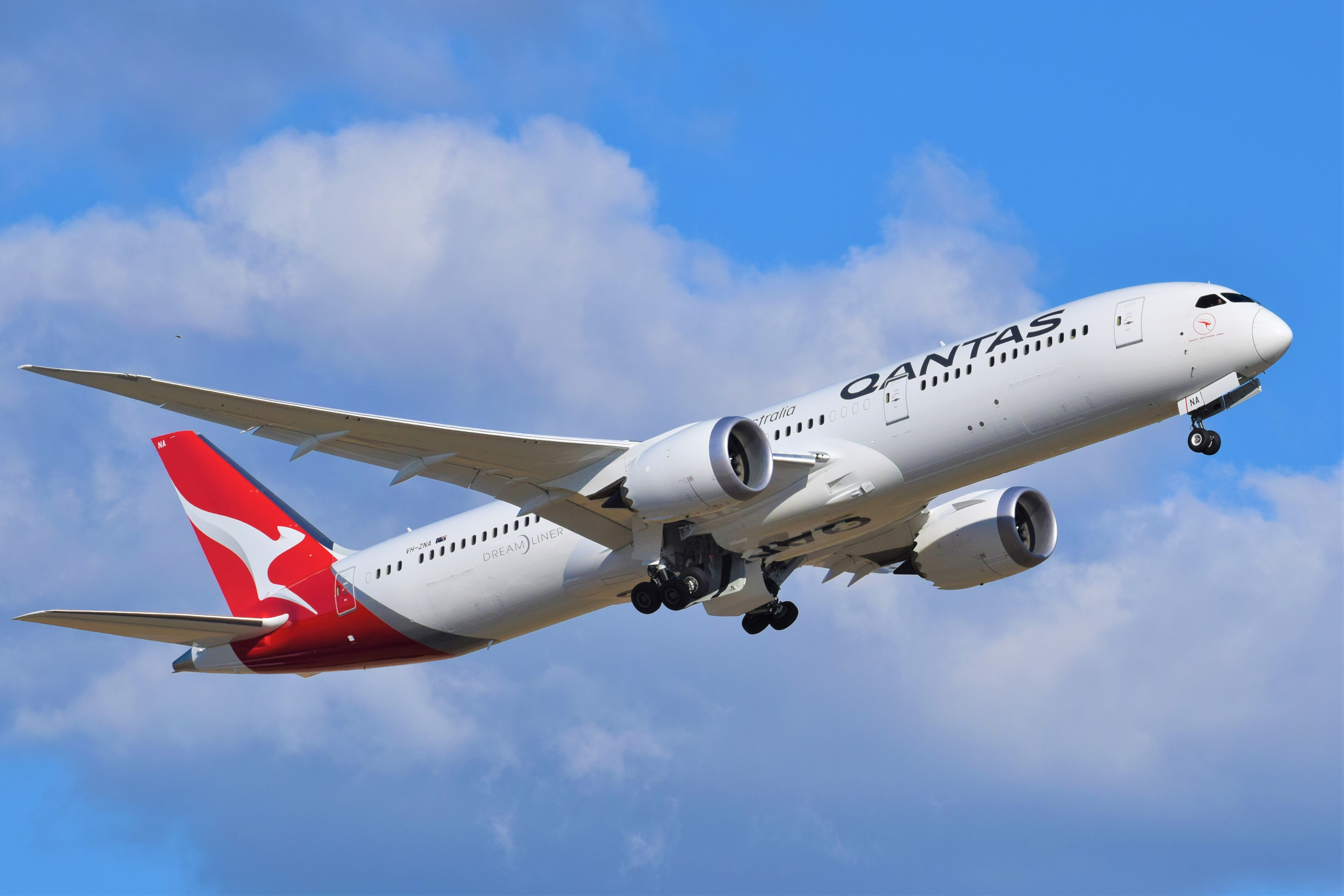
Boeing 787-9

== Order history ==
In August 2012, Qantas cancelled its order for 35 Boeing 787-9 aircraft due to losses and to conserve capital, while keeping its order for 15 Boeing 787-8 aircraft for Jetstar and purchase rights for 50 Boeing 787-9 aircraft. In August 2015, Qantas ordered eight Boeing 787-9 aircraft for delivery from 2017.

In February 2019, Qantas cancelled its remaining orders for eight Airbus A380-800 aircraft.

In June 2019, during the Paris Air Show, Qantas Group converted 26 Airbus A321neo orders to the ultra-long-range A321XLR variant, and another ten A321neo orders to the longer-range A321LR variant, and ordered an additional ten A321XLRs. This brought Qantas Group's total Airbus A320neo family order to 109 aircraft, consisting of 45 A320neos, 28 A321LRs, and 36 A321XLRs. At the time of the announcement, Qantas CEO Alan Joyce stated that a decision had not yet been made on how the aircraft would be distributed between Qantas and Jetstar, or whether they were to be used for network growth or the replacement of older aircraft.

In December 2019, Qantas selected the Airbus A350-1000 for its Project Sunrise program of non-stop flights from Sydney, Melbourne and Brisbane to cities such as London, New York, Paris, Rio de Janeiro, Cape Town, and Frankfurt. No orders had been placed but Qantas would work closely with Airbus to prepare contract terms for up to 12 aircraft ahead of a final decision by the Qantas Board. Due to the impact of the COVID-19 pandemic on aviation, plans for Project Sunrise were put on hold indefinitely.

In December 2021, Qantas selected the Airbus A321XLR to replace its Boeing 737-800s, and the Airbus A220 to replace its QantasLink Boeing 717s. The in-principle agreement was for up to 134 orders and purchase right options over more than ten years, with deliveries occurring sometime after July 2023. The order was expected to be finalised before June 2022.

In May 2022, Qantas placed an order for 12 Airbus A350-1000 for the Project Sunrise program. The first is expected to be delivered to Qantas in late 2026. An Airbus A350-1000 was flown to Sydney from Toulouse via Perth wearing Qantas decals to celebrate this order. The 238 seats will be split into six first class suites (three-abreast), 52 business class suites (four-abreast), 40 premium economy seats at 40″ pitch (eight-abreast) and 140 economy class seats at 33″ pitch (nine-abreast). The A350-1000 will be specially designed and certified for Qantas's requirements, it will feature a rear centre tank (RCT) that allows the aircraft to fly the distances required. In the same announcement, they finalised their order for the Airbus A321XLR and Airbus A220.

In February 2023, Qantas exercised nine purchase right options for the A220-300 aircraft, taking the total number of A220-300s on firm order to 29 for QantasLink.

In August 2023, Qantas ordered 24 new aircraft: four Boeing 787-9, eight Boeing 787-10, and 12 Airbus A350-1000. The former two will replace Airbus A330 aircraft from 2027. Qantas has purchase right options with Boeing and Airbus "to provide flexibility for future growth and, ultimately, replacement of the A380 fleet" from 2032.

In August 2025, Qantas exercised twenty purchase right options for an incremental order for 20 Airbus A321XLR aircraft to continue the replacement of the Boeing 737-800s, bringing the total order for Qantas to 48. 16 of these aircraft will be fitted with lie-flat business class seats and seat-back entertainment screens to operate a mix of medium-haul international and transcontinental routes. The aircraft with this new configuration will begin to arrive from 2028.

In August 2026, alongside its 2025–26 full-year results, Qantas announced that the Airbus A380 fleet would begin retiring from calendar 2028 rather than from the 2032 financial year as previously indicated, and that it was in discussions with Airbus and Boeing about converting around 20 existing purchase rights into firm orders for Airbus A350 and Boeing 787 aircraft from 2030. The type, variant and quantity had not been determined at the time of the announcement.

== Fleet age and renewal ==
=== Fleet age ===
Qantas reported an average fleet age against a stated target range in its annual reports until the mid-2010s. The Qantas Group's scheduled passenger fleet averaged 7.7 years at 30 June 2015, which the company described as "below the targeted 8–10 year range", and 8.6 years at 30 June 2016, "within the targeted 8–10 year range".

By February 2018 the aviation analysis firm CAPA – Centre for Aviation reported that the average age of the Qantas fleet had "steadily crept up" to 10.6 years, having previously been among the youngest in the Asia-Pacific region. In November 2018 S&P Global Ratings said that Qantas's average fleet age of close to ten years was higher than that of Singapore Airlines and almost double that of Emirates, and that the airline's level of investment was "inadequate" to fund replacement of its ageing aircraft, requiring a "step change" in spending from 2020. Qantas rejected the assessment, saying its fleet strategy was sound and that around 60 per cent of its fleet was debt-free.

Fleet age attracted renewed attention in the 2020s. In October 2024 Crikey reported that Qantas operated one of the oldest fleets of any major airline, at an average of about 15 years, and quoted a Qantas pilot describing the Boeing 737 fleet as "worn out and overworked". In his 2024 book The Chairman's Lounge, former Australian Financial Review columnist Joe Aston argued that the deferral of aircraft purchases during Alan Joyce's tenure as chief executive was among the most consequential decisions of that period.

Qantas leased in additional capacity while awaiting new deliveries. It wet-leased two Airbus A330-300s and crews from Finnair from 2023, replacing the arrangement with a dry lease of two aircraft from October 2025, and leased four mid-life Boeing 737-800s in 2025 to offset delivery delays. Returning the Airbus A380 fleet to service after pandemic storage also proved protracted: in February 2024, with seven A380s available, the airline reduced or deferred services on several long-haul routes, citing supply-chain problems and shortages of maintenance labour and hangar capacity at overseas facilities. The last stored aircraft, VH-OQC, did not re-enter service until December 2025, after nearly six years in storage and more than 100,000 hours of work that Qantas described as the largest maintenance check in its history.

=== Renewal program ===
Group net capital expenditure, which was A$944 million in the 2014–15 financial year and about $1 billion in 2015–16, rose to $3.85 billion in 2024–25 and $4.0 billion in 2025–26, with guidance of between $4.3 billion and $4.6 billion for 2026–27. Seventeen new aircraft were delivered across the Qantas Group in each of 2024–25 and 2025–26, with up to 31 expected during 2026–27.

Since the early 2020s the airline has been undertaking what it describes as the largest fleet renewal program in its history, progressively replacing its Boeing 737-800, Airbus A330 and Airbus A380 aircraft with Airbus A321XLR, Airbus A350-1000 and Boeing 787 types. The program followed a period of deferred aircraft investment during the 2010s, during which the average age of the fleet increased and drew criticism from credit-rating analysts and aviation commentators.

Retirements are scheduled to follow the deliveries. The first Boeing 737-800s are to be withdrawn from late 2026 as A321XLRs enter service; the A330 fleet is to be phased out progressively from 2026 into the mid-2030s; and the A380 fleet is to begin retiring in calendar 2028, four years earlier than the timetable indicated in 2023, with Qantas citing the end of A380 production and rising operating and maintenance costs.

Alongside new aircraft deliveries Qantas will retrofit cabins on existing types, including ten A330s from 2025 and 42 Boeing 737-800s from 2027; these aircraft are scheduled to leave the fleet towards the end of the renewal program.

== Fleet history ==
Qantas has had a varied fleet since the airline's inception. Following its foundation shortly after the end of the First World War, the first aircraft to serve in the fleet was the Avro 504K, a small biplane. In 1959, Qantas entered the jet age, with a delivery of seven Boeing 707 aircraft.

Qantas historical fleet
| Aircraft | Number | First used | Retired | Replacement | Notes |
|---|---|---|---|---|---|
| Airbus A380-800 | 2 | 2009 | 2020 | Boeing 787 | Both scrapped at Southern California Logistics Airport |
| Boeing 737-400 | 22 | 1992 | 2014 | Boeing 737 Next Generation | |
| Boeing 747-400 | 31 | 1989 | 2019 | Boeing 787 | City of Canberra is preserved. |
| Boeing 747-400ER | 6 | 2002 | 2020 | Boeing 787 | |
| Boeing 767-300ER | 37 | 1988 | 2014 | Airbus A330 | |

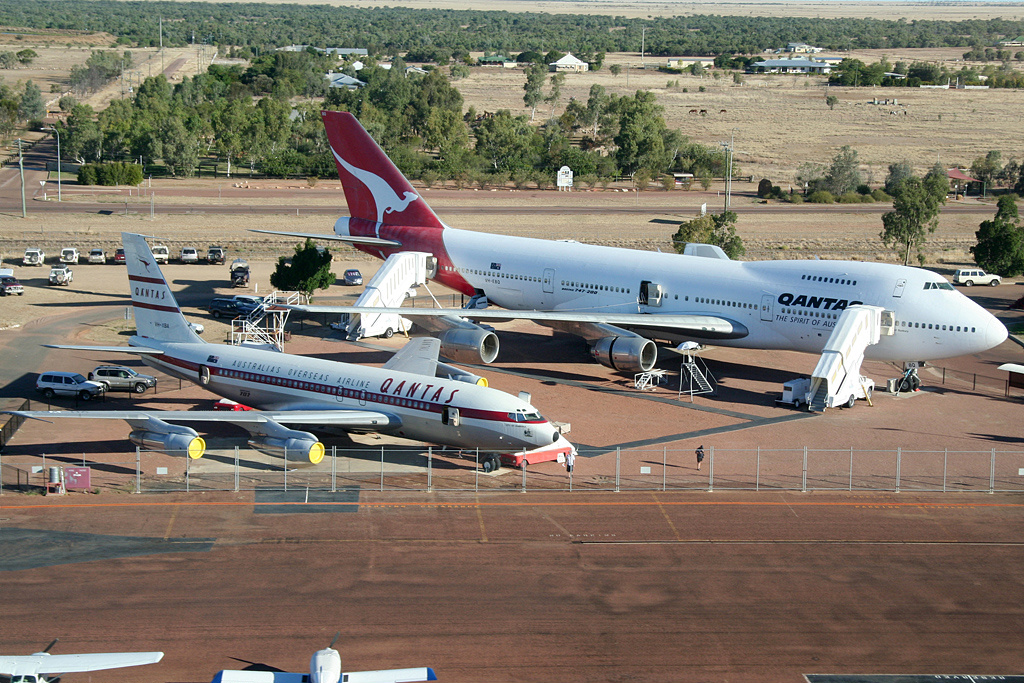
A Boeing 707 and Boeing 747-200 at Longreach's Qantas Founders Museum

=== First aircraft ===
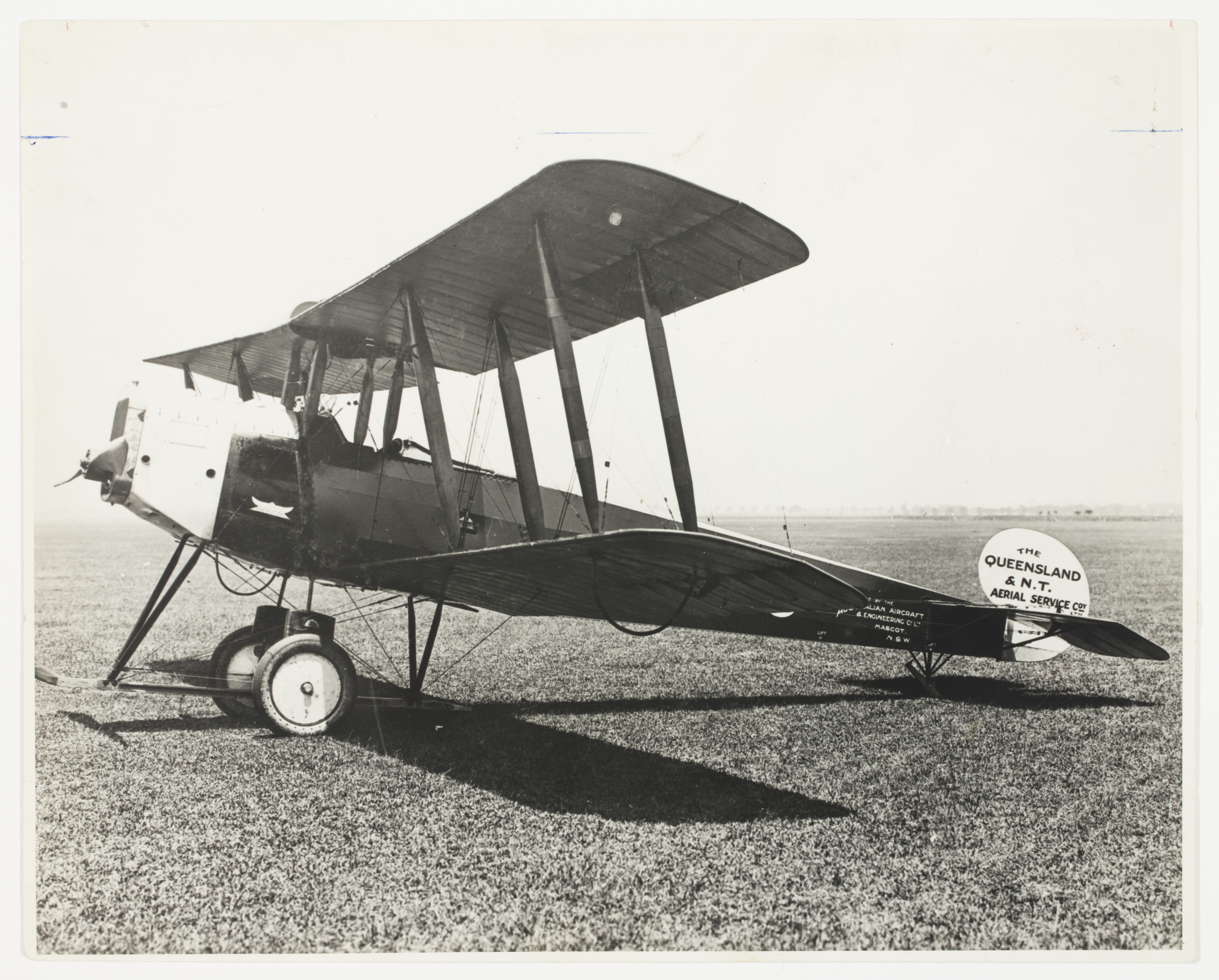
Avro Dyack, the first Qantas plane, ca. 1921

Qantas' first aircraft was an Avro 504K, with a 100-horsepower (74 kW) water-cooled Sunbeam Dyak engine. A replica of which can be seen at Qantas Campus, Mascot. By 1921 it also operated a Royal Aircraft Factory BE2E with a 90-horsepower (67 kW) air-cooled engine.

In the late 1930s, Qantas inaugurated its three-day-long Short Empire Flying Boat service between Rose Bay and Singapore-Kallang Airport. The run had stopovers in Townsville, Darwin and Surabaya. In 1943, the service was replaced by a long-range service, the Catalina flying boat.

=== World War II ===
During World War II, Qantas operated flying boats on the Australia-England route in cooperation with British Overseas Airways Corporation (BOAC). After Italy entered the war in June 1940, this became the Horseshoe Route between Sydney and Durban in South Africa, with the South Africa – UK stage being by sea. This service was a vital line of communication between Australia and the United Kingdom.

In June 1943, Qantas employed 5 Consolidated PBY Catalina flying boats—obtained under Lend-Lease through the British Air Ministry—to establish a route between Perth in Australia and Colombo in Sri Lanka, then Ceylon, over the Indian Ocean. Becoming known as The Double Sunrise, this route remains the longest non-stop commercial flight ever undertaken, requiring between 27 and 32 hours to complete, depending on winds. Over the next two years, 271 crossings took place.

Starting in June 1944, Qantas augmented the Catalinas with the first of two converted Consolidated B-24 Liberator bombers, which could complete the Australia–Ceylon journey in substantially less time, with a much larger payload. The route was named the Kangaroo Route and marked the first time that Qantas' now-famous kangaroo logo was used. Passengers received a certificate proclaiming them as members of The Order of the Longest Hop. A new version of the logo was launched in July 2007.

In June 1945, Avro Lancastrians were introduced on the Australia–England service, with the Liberators and Catalinas being shifted to other routes.

=== Post-war era ===
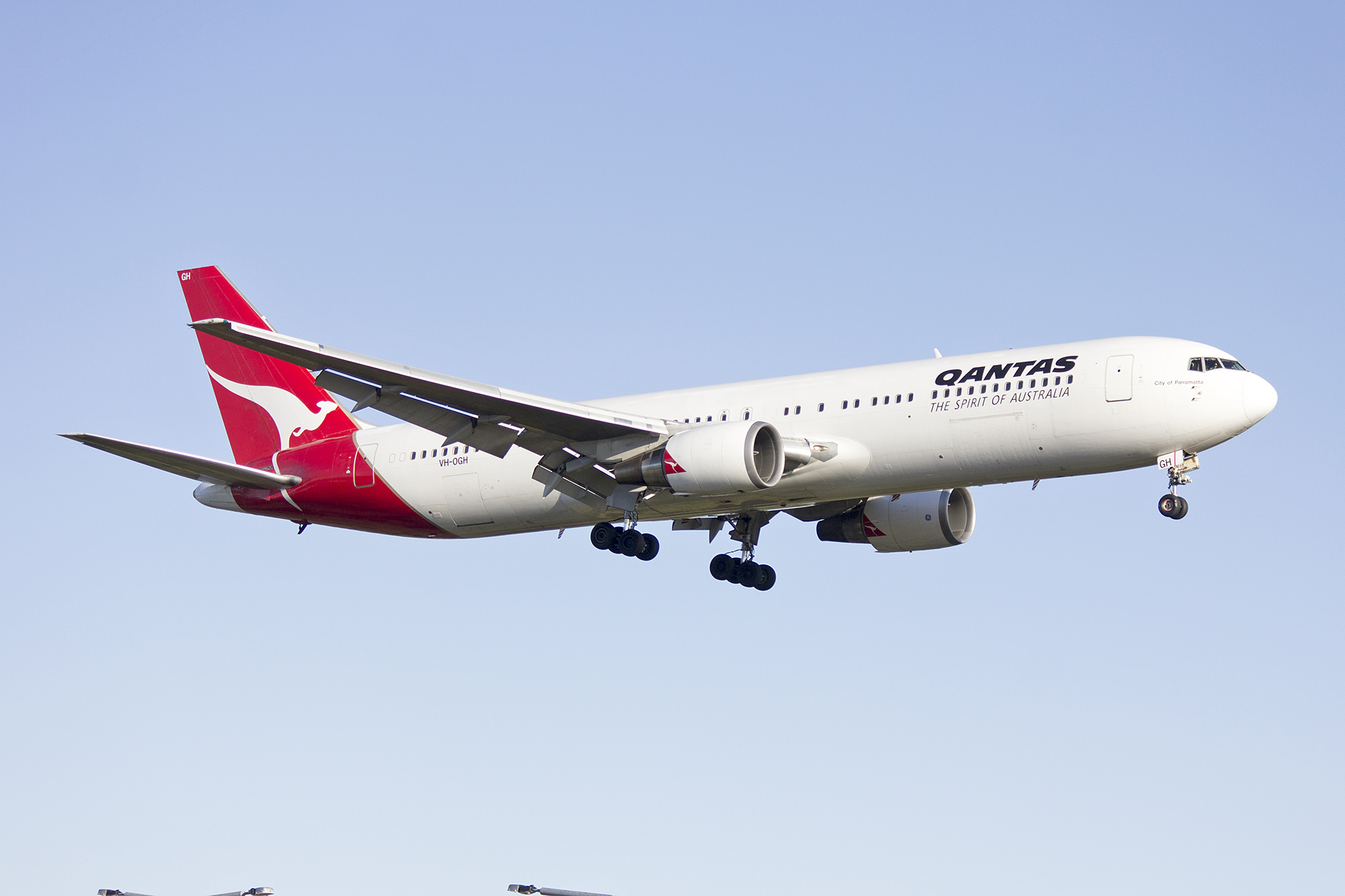
Boeing 767-300ER, 2013

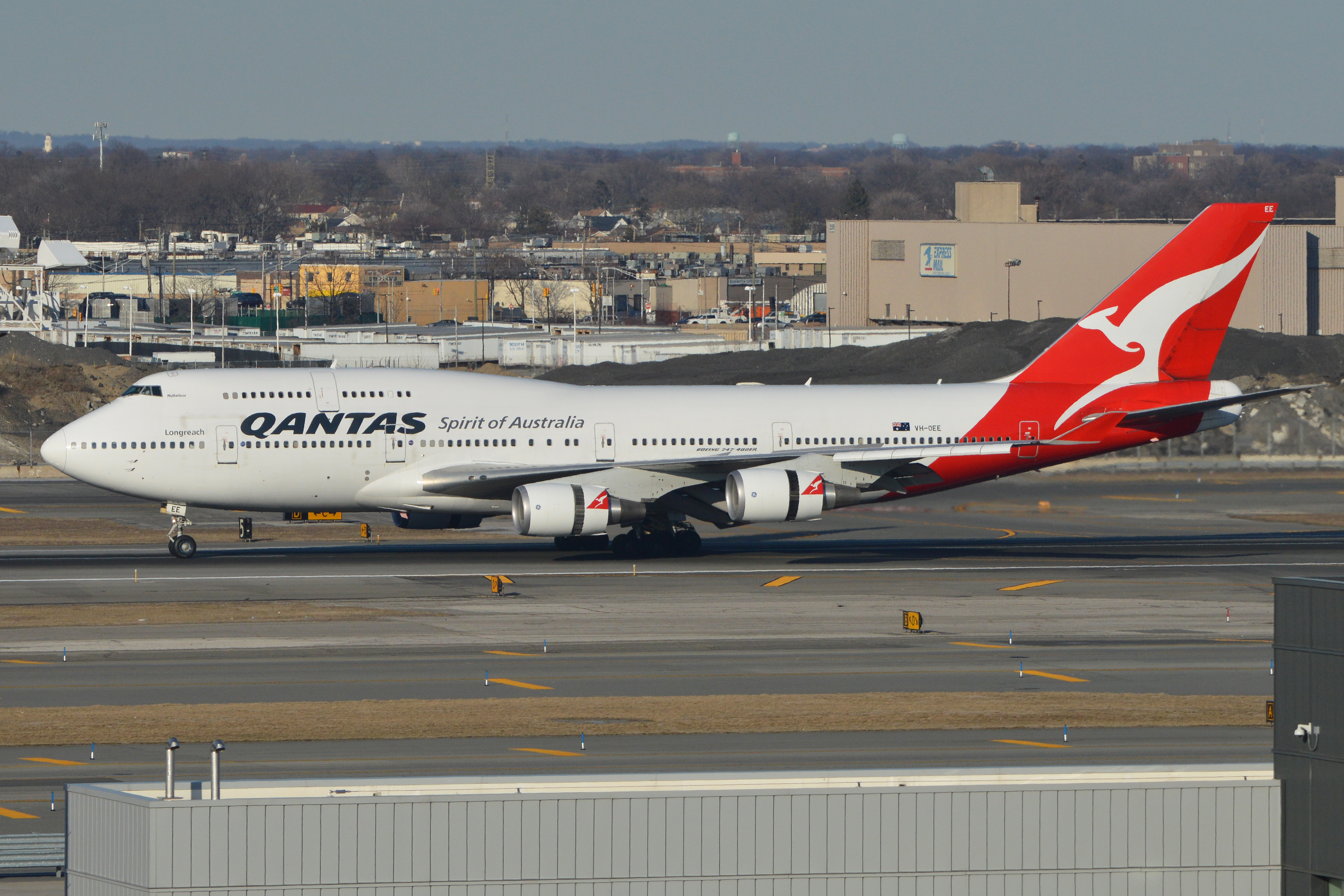
Boeing 747-400ER at JFK Airport, 2016

In accordance with the lend-lease agreement, the five modified Catalinas used for Double Sunrise service were scuttled after the war. Qantas obtained seven former Royal Australian Air Force Catalinas, using them to serve outlying South Pacific islands. The last two Catalinas were retired in 1958.

After World War II, Qantas modernised its fleet with Lockheed Constellation aircraft, commencing with six L-749 Constellations from 1947.

In 1949, Douglas DC-4 Skymasters were obtained, replacing Lancastrians on some routes.

In 1950, Qantas introduced the first of five Short Sandringham flying boats which flew from the Rose Bay flying boat base on Sydney Harbour, to destinations in New Caledonia, New Hebrides, Fiji, New Guinea and Lord Howe Island. Two of these were purchased from TEAL and the other three were purchased from BOAC. These were in service to 1955.

From 1954, Qantas placed into service the first of sixteen L-1049 Super Constellation aircraft, which remained in the fleet to 1963. By 1956, the airline was operating 34 propeller-driven aircraft. Qantas carried a record number of passengers to the 1956 Summer Olympics in Melbourne, and carried the Olympic flame into the Southern Hemisphere for the first time on its longest ever trip, from Athens to Darwin.

=== Jet age ===
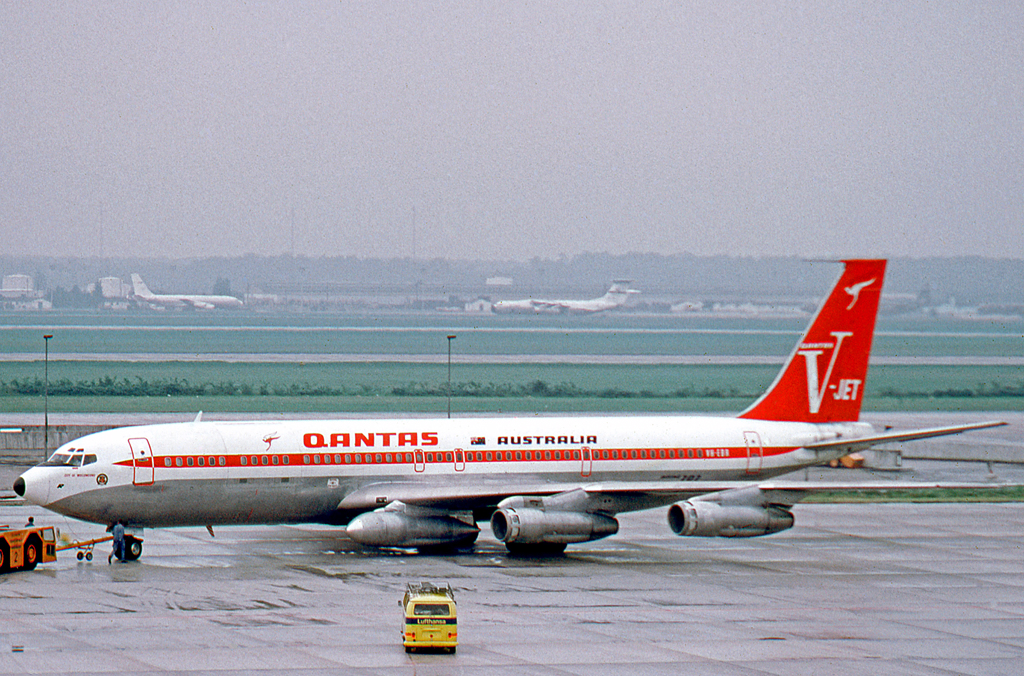
A Boeing 707 at Frankfurt Airport, 1972. Note the fifth engine under the wing.

Qantas entered the jet age in July 1959 with Boeing 707 services to the United States. The service was extended to London via New York. In October 1959, Sydney to London services via Bombay began. With the certification of the turbofan engine, Qantas modified its existing 707-138 fleet with the turbofans, naming its Boeing 707 aircraft V-Jets, from the Latin vannus, meaning "fan" as commonly accepted, but really standing for "thing that blows against the grain". In total, Qantas took delivery of seven Boeing 707-138s, and a further six 707-138Bs.

From November 1959 until May 1963, Qantas operated six de Havilland Comets, four being wet leased from BOAC. They were crewed by BOAC employees and featured Qantas titles on the fuselage in place of the BOAC titles.

In February 1965, Qantas placed in service the first of twenty-two Boeing 707-338Cs, which replaced the Boeing 707-138Bs and provided for expansion of the fleet. These flew until the last remaining one was retired in March 1979.

From 1971, Qantas operated the Boeing 747-238B, which strengthened its long haul fleet. When the Boeing 707s were retired in 1979, Qantas became the world's only all Boeing 747 operator. In 1981, two short body Boeing 747SPs entered the fleet for flights to Wellington, and they were subsequently used on non-stop flights between Sydney and Los Angeles.

In November 1984, Qantas began service with six Boeing 747-338s with an extended upper deck. From 1985, Qantas ceased being an all Boeing 747 operator when the first of seven Boeing 767-238ERs entered the fleet. These were followed by the Boeing 767-300ERs, with the first example delivered in August 1988. From August 2000, seven additional Boeing 767-336ERs were leased and subsequently purchased from British Airways.

On its delivery flight in July 1989, Qantas' first Boeing 747-400 flew a record-breaking non-stop flight from London to Sydney in little more than 20 hours. This record stood until bettered by a Boeing 787 in October 2019. Qantas purchased 60 Boeing 747s, with the last delivered in 2003. Fifty-seven were purchased new and three second-hand. Qantas leased a further five from other airlines at various stages. The last six Boeing 747-400s (specifically the -400ER variant) were retired in 2020.

In the early 1990s, Qantas was one of eight major airlines working with Boeing on the design of the Boeing 777. Despite being part of the design group, Qantas never acquired any 777s. Several aviation commentators have criticised this decision, as the 777 appeared to be a good fit for Qantas' requirements. While the reasons have never been made public by Qantas, it is believed that various reasons contributed to the decision, such as a Civil Aviation Safety Authority restriction on ETOPS 180 operations, errors made by Qantas in the forecasting of future fuel prices which made the 777 appear expensive to operate, and a desire to keep the number of types in the fleet to a minimum.

In 2008, Qantas took delivery of the first of 12 Airbus A380s. These aircraft were decommissioned during the COVID-19 pandemic, however, by April 2024, Qantas had returned ten of its original twelve A380s to service, with all serviceable aircraft having undergone major refurbishment work to enhance the onboard soft furnishings.

=== 1970 fleet ===
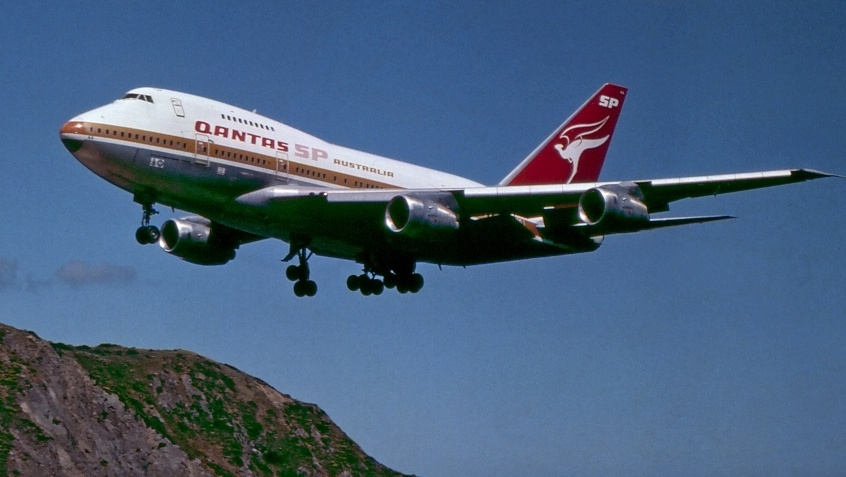
Boeing 747SP, 1984

Qantas Airways fleet in 1970
| Aircraft | Total | Orders | Notes |
|---|---|---|---|
| BAC/Sud Concorde | 0 | 0 | Four options. |
| Boeing SST | 0 | 0 | Six options. |
| Boeing 707-300 | 21 | 0 | |
| Boeing 747-200 | 0 | 4 | |
| Douglas DC-3 | 2 | 0 | |
| Douglas DC-4 | 2 | 0 | |
| Hawker Siddeley HS 125 | 2 | 0 | Used for pilot training. |
| Lockheed L-188 Electra | 1 | 0 | |
| Total | 28 | 4 | |

== Recent retirements ==
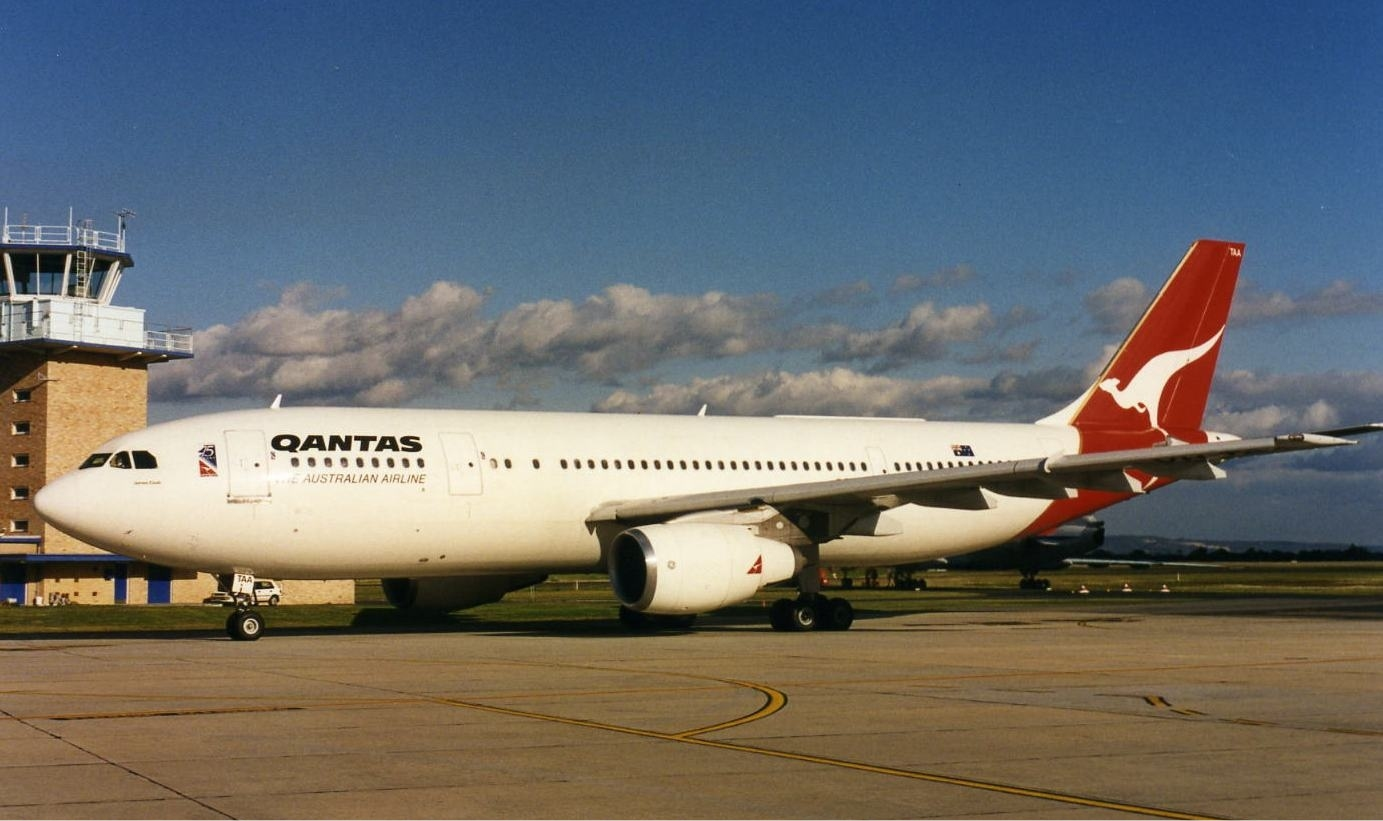
An Airbus A300B4-200 at Perth Airport in the 1990s.

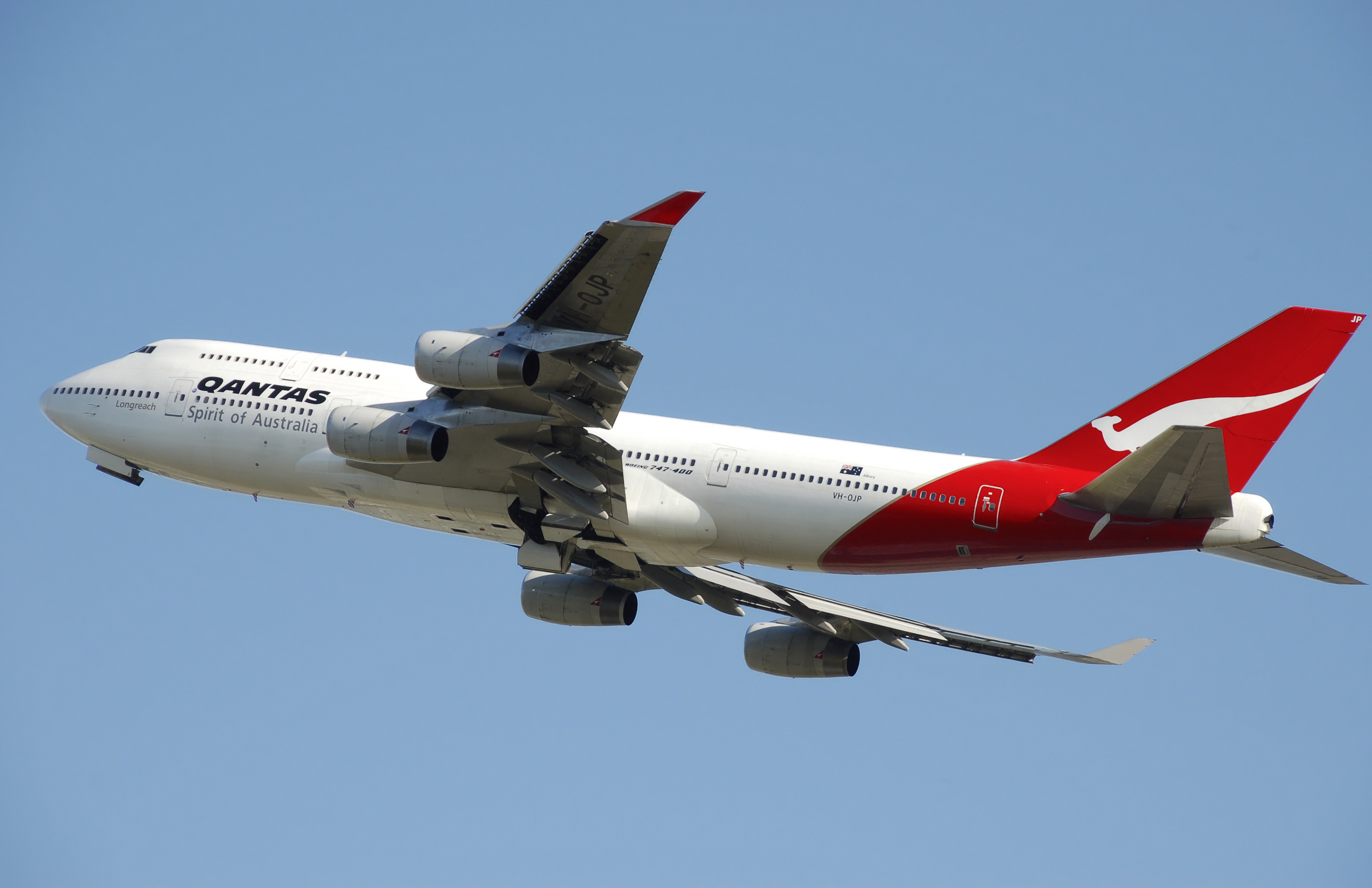
A Boeing 747-400 in the 2000s.

Qantas operated Airbus A300B4 aircraft after its acquisition of Australian Airlines. The airline also operated Boeing 737-300, Boeing 747-200, Boeing 747SP, Boeing 747-300 and Boeing 767-200ER aircraft.

In February 2014, Qantas retired its fleet of Boeing 737-400 aircraft.

Throughout 2014, Qantas' Boeing 767-300ER fleet was in the process of a phase-out, with the last five operating commercial services operating on 27 December. Four of them were sold to WestJet.

Qantas' oldest Boeing 747-400 (VH-OJA, City of Canberra) was retired in March 2015 and flown to Shellharbour Airport to be donated to the Historical Aviation Restoration Society.

In October 2019, Qantas' final Boeing 747-400 (VH-OJU, Lord Howe Island) was retired after operating QF99 from Sydney to Los Angeles. In March 2020, Qantas operated its last commercial Boeing 747 flight from Santiago de Chile to Sydney.

The final Boeing 747-400ER in the fleet (VH-OEJ, Wunala) departed Sydney on 22 July 2020 as flight number QF7474. It did a flypast of Sydney Harbour, Sydney CBD and the northern and eastern suburbs beaches, followed by a low level overfly of Shellharbour Airport in a final farewell to VH-OJA. Seats on three joy flights – over Sydney, Brisbane and Canberra – were offered before the aircraft's final flight. In the context of the COVID-19 pandemic's impact on Victoria, Melbourne was not offered a flight. The final flight departed from Sydney, while the aircraft was sprayed with jets of water and crowds looked on. Its flight path traced Qantas's 'Flying Kangaroo' logo in the sky as it headed east, and entered retirement in the Californian desert in Mojave.

== Preserved aircraft ==
- Boeing 747-400 (VH-OJA, City of Canberra) - Historical Aircraft Restoration Society (Shellharbour Airport, NSW)
- Boeing 747-200 (VH-EBQ, City of Bunbury) - Qantas Founders Museum (Longreach Airport, QLD)
- Boeing 707-138B (VH-EBM / N707JT) - Historical Aircraft Restoration Society (Shellharbour Airport, NSW)
- Boeing 707-338C (VH-EAG) - Historical Aircraft Restoration Society (Shellharbour Airport, NSW) - Forward fuselage
- Boeing 707-138 (VH-XBA, City of Canberra) - Qantas Founders Museum (Longreach Airport, QLD)
- Douglas DC-3 (VH-EAP) - Qantas Founders Museum (Longreach Airport, QLD)

== Naming ==
The naming of Qantas aircraft has followed various themes since 1926.

- 1926 de Havilland DH.50 – figures from Greek mythology – Iris, Perseus, Pegasus, Atalanta, Hermes, and Hippomenes
- 1926 de Havilland DH.9 – figure from Greek mythology – Ion
- 1929 de Havilland DH.61 – figures from Greek mythology – Apollo, Diana, Hermes and Athena
- 1938 Short Empire C Class Flying boat – mainly Australian coastal place names – Carpentaria, Coorong, Cooee, Coolangatta, Coogee and Corio; four aircraft (Clifton, Camilla, Coriolanus, and Calypso) transferred from British Overseas Airways Corporation during World War II.
- 1943 Consolidated PBY Catalina – stars – Rigel Star, Spica Star, Altair Star, Vega Star, Antares Star.
- 1947 Lockheed L-749 Constellation – Australian aviation personalities – Ross Smith, Lawrence Hargrave, Harry Hawker, Charles Kingsford Smith, Bert Hinkler and Horace Brinsmead.
- 1949 Douglas DC-4 – "Trader" theme – Pacific Trader, Norfolk Trader, New Guinea Trader, Hong Kong Trader, Malayan Trader, Australian Trader, Philippine Trader.
- 1951 Short Sandringham S.25 Flying Boat – "Pacific" theme – Pacific Warrior, Pacific Chieftain, Pacific Voyager and Pacific Explorer.
- 1954 Lockheed L-1049 Super Constellation – "Southern" theme – Southern Aurora, Southern Boomerang, Southern Breeze, Southern Constellation, Southern Dawn, Southern Horizon, Southern Melody, Southern Mist, Southern Moon, Southern Prodigal, Southern Sea, Southern Sky, Southern Spray, Southern Star, Southern Sun, Southern Tide, Southern Wave, Southern Wind and Southern Zephyr. Also, the Super Constellation L-1049F restored by the Historical Aircraft Restoration Society (HARS) was named "Southern Preservation", in the theme of the original aircraft.
- 1958 de Havilland Canada DHC-3 Otter – New Guinea theme – Kikori (Papua), Kokopo (New Britain), Kieta (Bougainville), and Kerowagi (New Guinea).
- 1959 Lockheed L-188 Electra – "Pacific" theme – Pacific Electra, Pacific Explorer, Pacific Endeavour and Pacific Enterprise
- 1959 Boeing 707-138 – Australian cities, mainly capital cities – City of Canberra, City of Sydney, City of Melbourne, City of Brisbane, City of Perth, City of Adelaide, City of Hobart, City of Darwin, Winton, Longreach, City of Newcastle, City of Geelong and City of Launceston.
- 1965 Boeing 707-338 – Australian cities – City of Parramatta, City of Townsville, Alice Springs, City of Ballarat, City of Wollongong, Kalgoorlie, City of Bendigo, and so on.

City names continued on all Qantas ordered and delivered Boeing 747, Boeing 747SP and Boeing 767 aircraft until 2008.

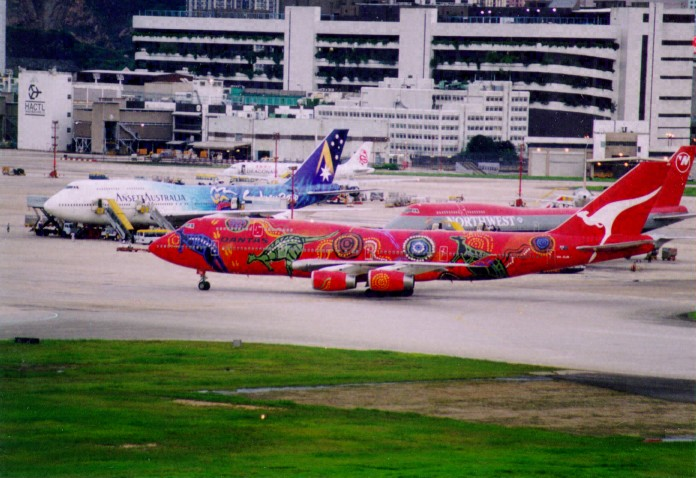
Wunala Dreaming at Kai Tak Airport

- 1989 Boeing 747-400 – in addition to their usual city names, all Boeing 747-400 aircraft carry the word "Longreach" as part of the livery. This is actually a double meaning - it signifies both the "long reach" of the aircraft (i.e. they have a long range), and the town where Qantas commenced operations : Longreach, Queensland.
- In 1993 Qantas obtained a domestic route network when Australian Airlines (formerly Trans Australia Airlines) was merged into Qantas. Australian Airlines had used different naming conventions and these names were carried over.
  - 1981 Airbus A300 – Australian explorers – James Cook, John Oxley, John Forrest, William Light and John Fawkner
  - 1986 Boeing 737-300 – inspirational names – Courageous, Advance, Adventure, Boldness, Challenge, Daring, Enterprise, Intrepid, Progress, Success, Valiant, Victory, Resolute, Fortitude, Endeavour and Gallant
  - 1990 Boeing 737-400 – birds – Kookaburra, Brolga, Eagle, Falcon, Swan, Heron, Ibis, Swift, Kestrel, Egret, Lorikeet, Petrel, Bellbird, Cockatiel, Jabiru, Kingfisher and Currawong Also, the final few Boeing 737-400s delivered were named as per the 737-300 convention – Sharing, Trust, Integrity and Tenacity.
- 1993 – Aboriginal Art – six aircraft have been painted with five different Aboriginal liveries and named accordingly; initially to celebrate the 1993 International observance of International Year for the World's Indigenous People. There has been some criticism of Qantas for using Indigenous names and imagery as Indigenous Australians are under-represented in its workforce.
  - Wunala Dreaming (Boeing 747-400 VH-OJB and Boeing 747-400ER VH-OEJafter retirement of OJB) (OJB was repainted into regular Qantas livery) The design was by John Moriarty and his wife Ros (Balarinji Designs); the design features the spirits of Indigenous Australians in the form of kangaroos travelling through the red desert landscape. VH-OEJ was repainted back into the standard Qantas livery in 2012. Wunala means kangaroo.
  - Nalanji Dreaming (Boeing 747-300 VH-EBU) was also painted to a design by John and Ros Moriarty and was launched in 1995. The aircraft has been retired in 2008.
  - Yananyi Dreaming (Boeing 737-800 VH-VXB) launched in 2002; the artwork was by Rene Kulitja, a Pitjitjantjarra woman from Mutitjulu, near Uluru. repainted into corporate livery - September 2014.
  - Mendoowoorrji (Boeing 737-800 VH-XZJ) was designed by John and Ros Moriarty based on the 2005 painting 'Medicine Pocket' by West Australian Aboriginal artist Paddy Bedford and launched in November 2013.
  - Emily Kame Kngwarreye (Boeing 787 Dreamliner VH-ZND) was inspired by the 1991 artwork 'Yam Dreaming', painted by the late artist, Emily Kame Kngwarreye. The painting captures the essence of the yam plant, an important symbol in Emily's Dreamtime story, and an important food source in her home region of Utopia, 230 kilometres north east of Alice Springs.
- 2008 Airbus A380 – Australian Aviation Pioneers – Nancy-Bird Walton, Hudson Fysh, Paul McGinness, Fergus McMaster, Lawrence Hargrave, Charles Kingsford Smith, Charles Ulm, Reginald Ansett, David Warren, Bert Hinkler, John and Reginald Duigan, and Phyllis Arnott. Names were also announced for the eight orders that were eventually cancelled. These were planned to be Keith Macpherson Smith and Ross Macpherson Smith, Lester Brain, Lores Bonney, Norman Brearley, P G Taylor, Scotty Allan, John Flynn and Gaby Kennard.
- 2014 Boeing 737-800 – Aircraft in Historical Qantas Livery – James Strong and Retro Roo II. The first aircraft appears in the Qantas 1971 to 1984 livery and the second aircraft appears in Qantas' first jet livery used from 1959 to 1961.
- 2017 Boeing 787-9 – Australiana – Great Barrier Reef, Boomerang, Skippy, Waltzing Matilda, Uluru, Great Southern Land, Quokka, Dreamtime, Billabong.
