= Parkes Airport =

- IATA: PKE; ICAO: YPKS

Summary
- Airport type: Public
- Owner/Operator: Parkes Shire Council
- Location: Parkes, New South Wales
- Elevation AMSL: 1,069 ft / 326 m
- Coordinates: 33.13109°S 148.24099°E
- Website: https://www.parkes.nsw.gov.au/living-here/your-community/airport

Map
- Location in New South Wales

Runways
Direction	Length		Surface
Direction	m	ft	Surface
04/22	1,684	5,525	Asphalt
11/29	1,623	5,325	Asphalt

Statistics (2024-25)
- Passengers: 17,701
- Aircraft movements: 1,821
- Sources: Australian AIP and aerodrome chart. Passengers and aircraft movements from BITRE

Parkes Airport (IATA: PKE, ICAO: YPKS) is an airport located 4 nautical miles (7.4 km; 4.6 mi) northeast of Parkes, New South Wales, Australia. The airport handled approximately 17,700 scheduled passengers in 2024-25, down from a peak of over 35,000 in 2018-19. The Parkes Shire Council currently maintains the airport.

== History ==
A site was identified east of town for a public aerodrome around 1920. By 1923, the Department of Defence proposed Parkes become a regular stopping place for military aircraft transiting routes between Adelaide and Sydney, and Queensland.

As the municipal council sought to expand the aerodrome, they faced legal challenges from groups including the Forbes Pastures Protection Board, who objected to portions of a travelling stock route falling within the crown lease. The matter was resolved by conditions on the lease that prohibited fencing, ensured livestock had access to the site and that no buildings could be erected. By 1929, the council had renewed the lease with amendments that allowed construction of the first hangar on the site for the local Aero Club.

In March 1936, a Hawker Demon of the Royal Australian Air Force crash-landed while attempting to avoid cattle that had ventured onto the airfield. Neither of the two aircrew were injured.

=== RAAF Station Parkes ===
From 1941, the aerodrome was developed by the Royal Australian Air Force to train aircrew under the Empire Air Training Scheme. Notably, future Prime Minister Gough Whitlam graduated as a Flying Officer from No. 1 Air Navigation School at Parkes in 1943.

=== Post war ===
A Non-directional beacon was installed at the airport in 1948. By 1950, the airport handled up to six flights per day, with Butler Air Transport operating a route to Sydney and Australian National Airways connecting Parkes with Melbourne and Dubbo.

In 1949, the Federal Government converted most of the buildings vacated by the RAAF for use as a migrant hostel. The facility, which could initially house around 1000, was used to accommodate people displaced by World War 2 in Europe, many of them left stateless. Under the post-war assisted migration scheme, migrant families were permitted to live in this camp for 3 to 12 months. The men would be assigned work around the state, with many signing 2 year work agreements with the Australian government as a condition of relocating. The Parkes Holding Centre closed in May 1952.

== Historical Aircraft Restoration Society ==
Due to space constraints at their main Shellharbour Airport base, the Historical Aircraft Restoration Society began using Parkes as a storage location in 2015. Based out of a Bellman Hangar built during the airport's use a RAAF Base, the workshop has since expanded into a public aviation museum.

A growing collection of aircraft are on static display in and outside the hangar, with several exhibits maintained or restored to airworthy condition. Aircraft on display at the HARS Parkes Aviation Museum include:

- Bell AH-1 Cobra
- Convair 580 - VH-PDW
- de Havilland Canada DHC-4 Caribou - A4-275
- de Havilland Heron - VH-AHB
- Fokker F100 - VH-NHO
- GAF Jindivik - A92-22
- Lockheed AP-3C Orion - A9-759
- Lockheed P-2 Neptune
  - P2V-5 Neptune - A89-302
  - SP-2H Neptune - A89-272
- Westland Wessex - N7-203

== Airlines and destinations ==
Airlines	Destinations
Rex Airlines	Sydney

== Statistics ==
Annual passenger and aircraft statistics for Parkes
Year	Revenue passengers	Aircraft movements
2015–16	27,420	1,925
2016–17	28,418	1,765
2017–18	30,247	1,748
2018–19	35,640	2,008
2019–20	25,676	1,790
2020–21	5,163	933
2021–22	9,417	1,202
2022–23	28,669	2,259
2023–24	19,244	1,612
2024–25	17,701	1,821

== See also ==
- List of airports in New South Wales
