= Horace Brinsmead =

Horace Clowes Brinsmead MC (2 February 1883 – 11 March 1934) was the Controller of Aviation in Australia between 1920 and 1933.

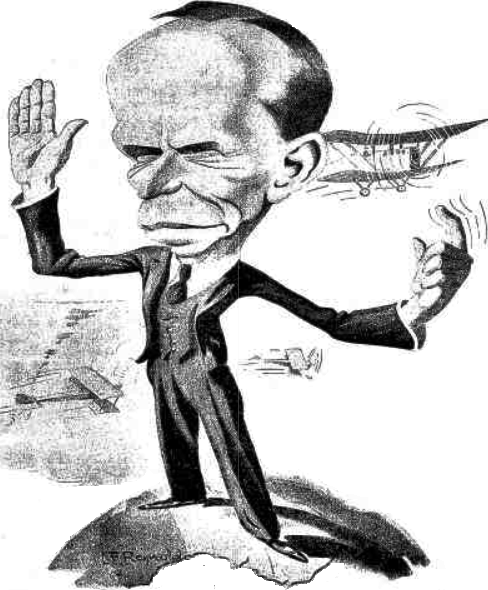
1926 caricature by Reynolds

Brinsmead was born in 1883 at Hampstead, London, the son of Edgar William Brinsmead and Annie Brinsmead. He migrated to Australia around 1903, where he settled down in North Queensland, later in Tonga. When the First World War started in 1914, he joined the First Australian Imperial Force. He served and fought on Gallipoli and at Pozières.

Recovering in England after an injury in 1916 and after completing an officers course, he served in the Australian Flying Corps at its headquarters in London. The AFC headquarters was responsible for supervising the Australian Training Wing which was based in England. Brinsmead was promoted to lieutenant colonel in 1919.

After his return to Australia in 1920, Horace Brinsmead was appointed Australia's first Controller of Civil Aviation. On 8 December 1920, he married Ivy Ernestine McDonald, daughter of Charles McDonald.

In 1931, while travelling to London to negotiate for the establishment of the first air mail route between England and Australia, his plane was destroyed on takeoff at Alor Setar in Malaysia. There were no casualties and Brinsmead suffered only minor injuries. Instead of waiting for a replacement airplane, he took a commercial flight. This airplane crashed on takeoff at Don Muang Airport in Bangkok on 7 December. Five others were killed, Brinsmead survived with bad injuries but was no longer able to work. He was brought back to Australia in February 1932, officially still holding his office. Acting Controller during the following year was his deputy Edgar Johnston, until he took office in 1933.

Brinsmead died in March 1934 in Melbourne, leaving one son and two daughters.

== Tributes ==
- In 1951, the Australian Airline Qantas named a Lockheed Constellation airliner after Brinsmead. Three years later, between 8 and 26 March 1954, the airliner, specially-equipped, was used to carry Queen Elizabeth II and the Duke of Edinburgh on six flights during the Queen's first Royal Tour of Australia. In mid-1954, it was sold to BOAC.
- In his book about Australia Down Under in 2000, the writer Bill Bryson retold the history of Brinsmead, but called him Harold C. Brinsmead. This confusion might in part be explained in that Brinsmead was entered into Cranleigh School under the first name 'Harold' so he may have been called both. Bryson mentioned it as ironic fact that Brinsmead undertook his last journey to show the reliability of aviation.

== Sources ==
- Biography from the Melbourne Museum of Aviation
- McIntyre, Darryl (1979). "Horace Clowes Brinsmead (1883–1934)". Australian Dictionary of Biography. Vol. 7. National Centre of Biography, Australian National University. ISBN 978-0-522-84459-7. ISSN 1833-7538. OCLC 70677943.
