= City of Canberra (aircraft) =

Retired Boeing 747 aircraft

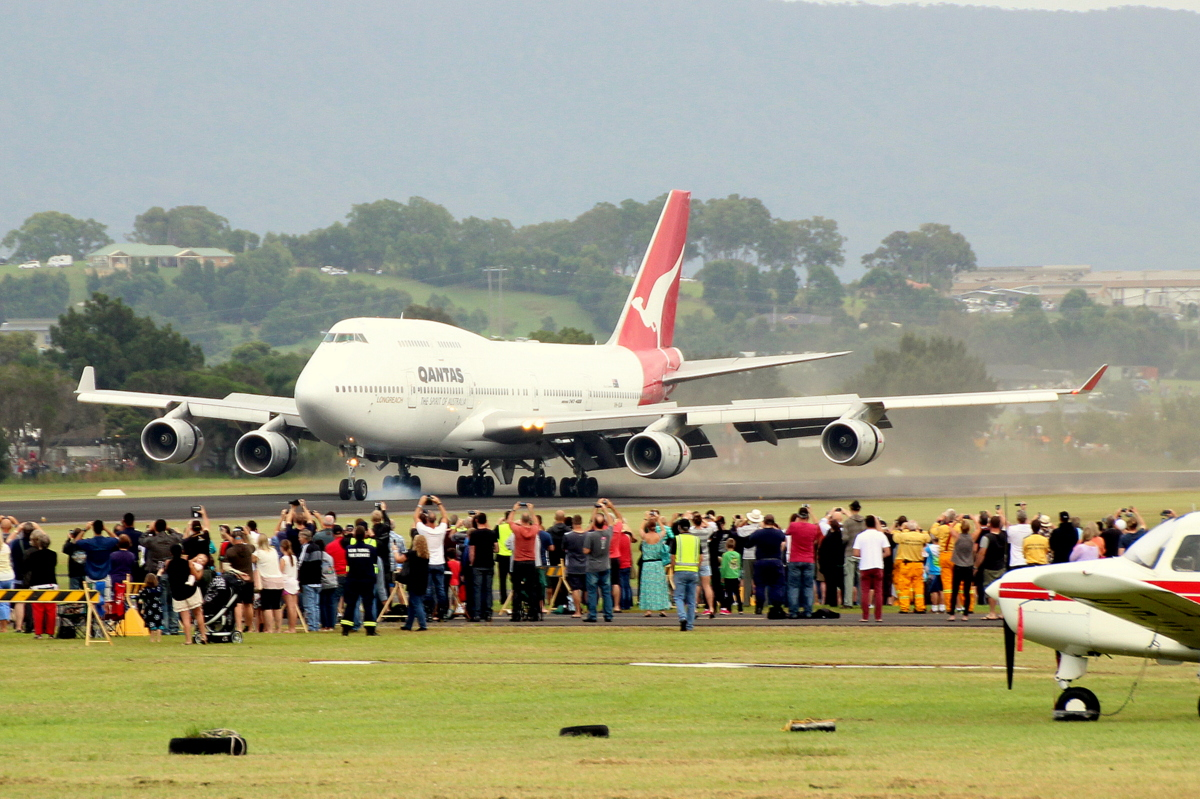
- The City of Canberra lands for the last time at Shellharbour Airport, 8 March 2015

General information
- Type: Boeing 747-438
- Status: Preserved by Historical Aircraft Restoration Society
- Owners: Qantas
- Construction number: 24354 (Line Number 731)
- Registration: N6046P (Boeing Test); VH-OJA (Qantas)
- Flights: 13,833
- Total hours: 106,154
- Total distance: 85 million kilometres

History
- Manufactured: February 1989
- First flight: 3 July 1989
- In service: 6 September 1989 - 13 January 2015
- Last flight: 8 March 2015
- Preserved at: Shellharbour Airport

The City of Canberra is a preserved Boeing 747-438, registered as VH-OJA. The aircraft was delivered to Qantas in 1989 and now on display at the Historical Aircraft Restoration Society museum at Shellharbour Airport, Albion Park Rail, Australia.

On 16–17 August 1989, whilst en route from the Boeing Everett Factory in the United States following its registration as a newly completed Qantas aircraft, the City of Canberra made a non-stop delivery flight from London Heathrow to Qantas' headquarters in Sydney.

As of February 2015, the month of the aircraft's final passenger-carrying flight, this was still the longest non-stop un-refuelled delivery flight by an airliner. One of the first Qantas A350-1000ULR's which will be used for the Project Sunrise flights from Sydney to London (LHR) journey will reuse this same registration - VH-OJA.

== Aircraft ==
The City of Canberra, registered VH-OJA and named after Australia's capital city, was the first Boeing 747-400 delivered to Qantas. (Note: The aircraft is a Boeing 747-400 model; Boeing assigns a unique code for each company that buys one of its aircraft, which is applied as a suffix to the model number at the time the aircraft is built. Boeing's code for Qantas is 38, hence 747-438.) It was not modified for the flight in any way – such as by the installation of extra fuel tanks – but some items of equipment were removed from the galleys and cargo compartments to save weight.

== Record-breaking flight ==
The 747-438 took 20 hours and 9 minutes to fly a distance of 9,720 nautical miles (18,001 km) from London Heathrow to Sydney. The elapsed time was six minutes longer than the quickest non-stop England to Australia flight, which was made by an Avro Vulcan of the Royal Air Force in 1961. The City of Canberra set a record for the longest un-refuelled flight by a commercial aircraft, as the Vulcan was a military aircraft and had to be refuelled in flight several times while flying from RAF Scampton to RAAF Base Richmond near Sydney.

City of Canberra also set the record for the shortest ever 747 flight. In March 2015, it flew from Sydney to Shellharbour with a flight time of 12 minutes. This record was beaten by a British Airways 747-400 that made a nine minute flight from Cardiff to MOD St Athan in November 2019.

== Subsequent history ==
=== Service with Qantas ===
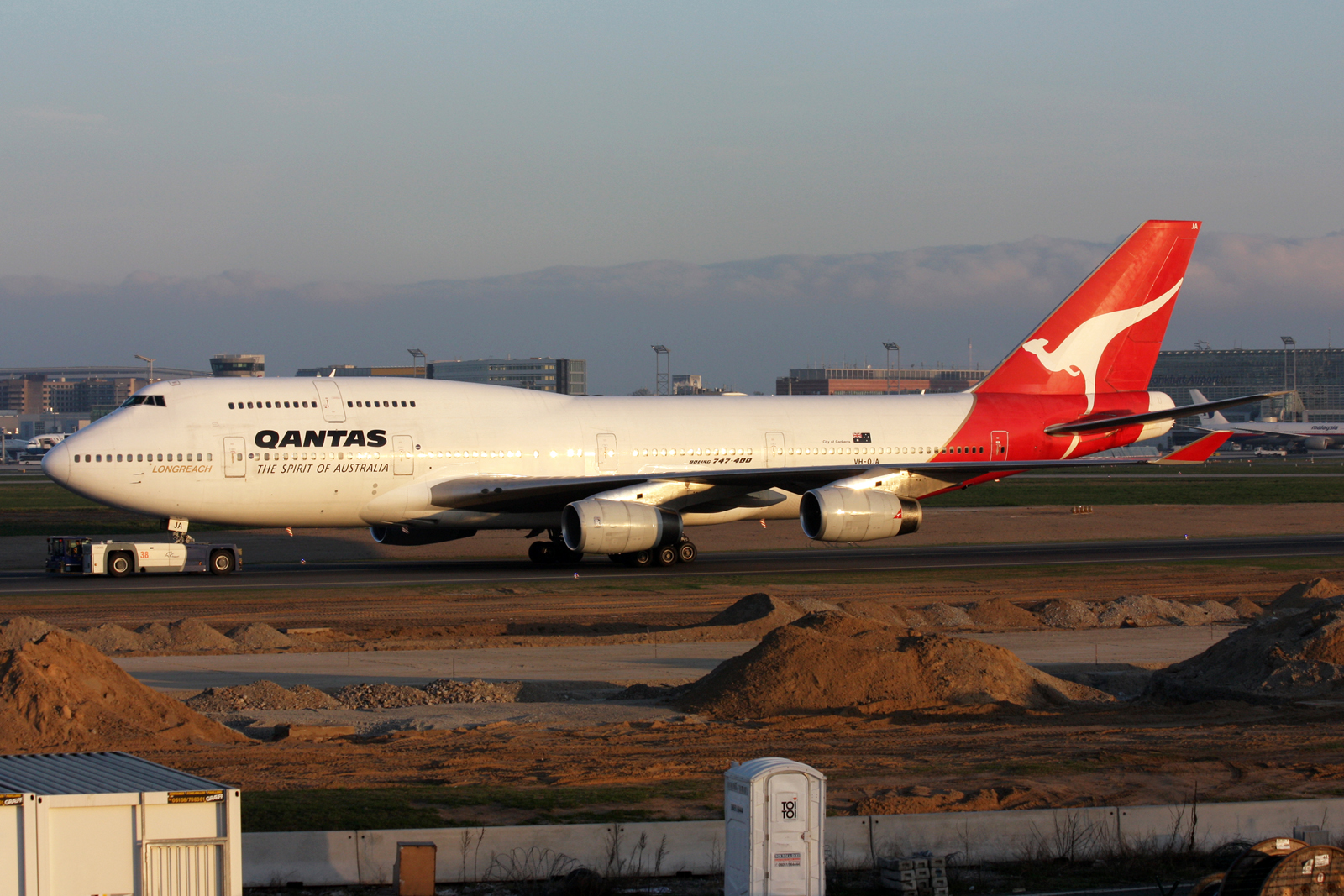
City of Canberra at Frankfurt Airport in 2011

The City of Canberra remained in service with Qantas until January 2015, when it was retired as part of the draw-down of the airline's fleet of 747s. While in service with Qantas, the aircraft operated more than 13,000 flights, and carried more than three million passengers. Its last passenger-carrying flight was from Johannesburg to Sydney on 13–14 January 2015.

=== Leased by Ansett ===
In October 1994, VH-OJA was wet leased by Qantas' then-main domestic competitor Ansett after its Boeing 747-300, VH-INH, was damaged while landing at Sydney Airport. Another Qantas 747, VH-OJL, was also leased by Ansett to cover VH-INH's flights while it was repaired.

=== Final flight ===
The aircraft was subsequently donated to the Historical Aircraft Restoration Society at Shellharbour Airport via a delivery flight on 8 March 2015. Pilots trained on simulators for the landing and reduced the aircraft's weight including reducing the tyre pressure to 120 pounds per square inch from the typical 208, and carrying 25,400 litres of fuel, versus the maximum of 217,000 litres.

=== Public display ===
The City of Canberra at HARS Aviation Museum in 2024

The City of Canberra was placed on public display after a short period of decommissioning. On a tour of the Historical Aircraft Restoration Society at Shellharbour Airport, members of the public can board the inside of the aircraft. Visitors to the aircraft can carry out such activities as going through the pre-departure checklist with a pilot, making announcements over the PA system, and arming and cross-checking the doors.

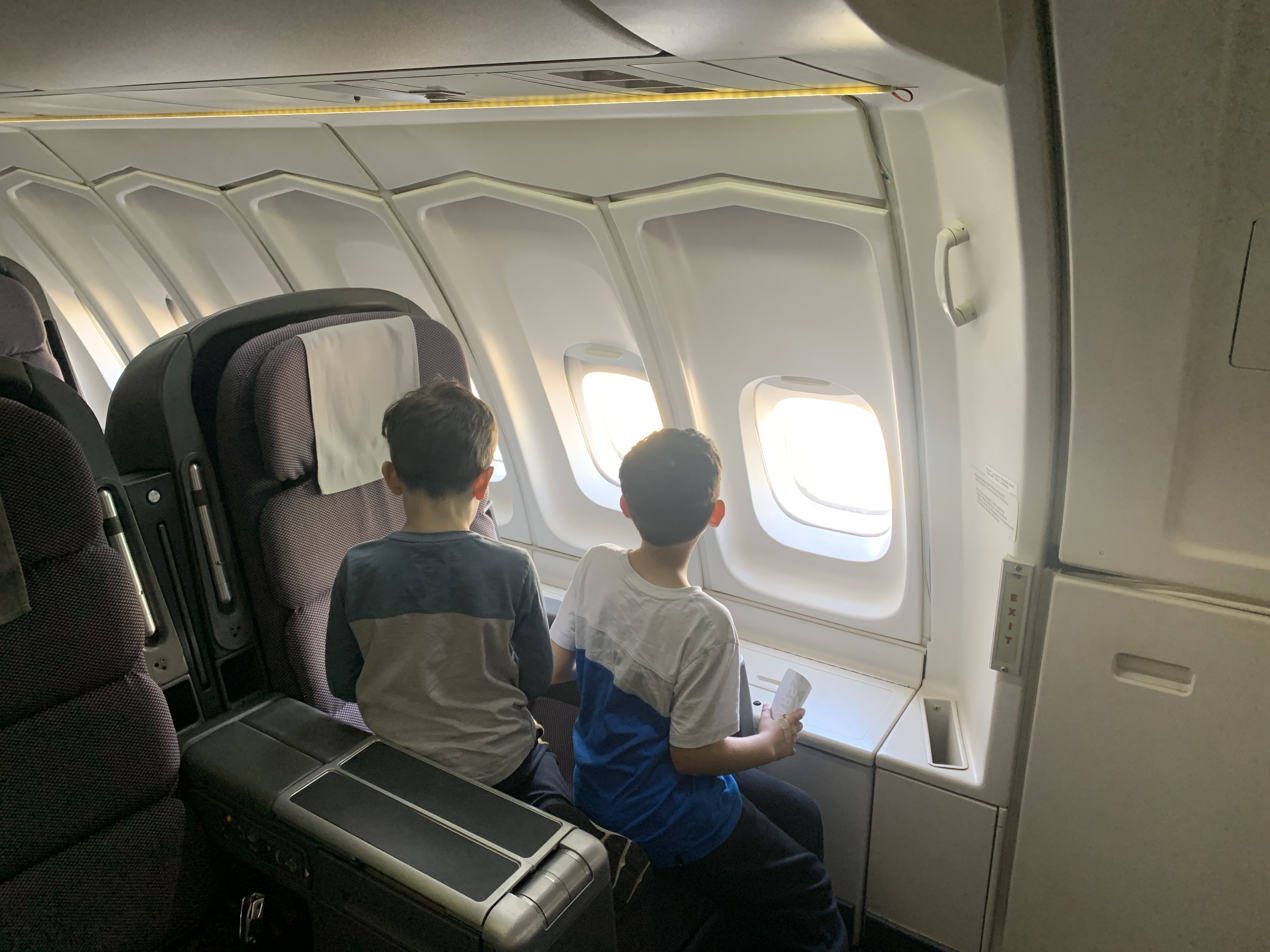
Business class upper deck of City of Canberra, on display at HARS

== Namesakes ==
The City of Canberra name has also been carried by other first deliveries for Qantas, including two other Boeing 747s. The first Boeing 707-138 delivered in July 1959, the first Boeing 747-238 delivered in August 1971 and the first Boeing 747-338 delivered in November 1984 all carried the name.

A 707-338C purchased by Qantas in 1967 also bore the name. After several post-Qantas ownerships, that aircraft was purchased by Northrop Grumman in 1992 for conversion to a E-8C Joint STARS for the United States Air Force. In 1996, it became the first of such aircraft to enter service, remaining in this role until it was retired on 10 February 2022.
