= Historical Aircraft Restoration Society =

Australian aviation nonprofit

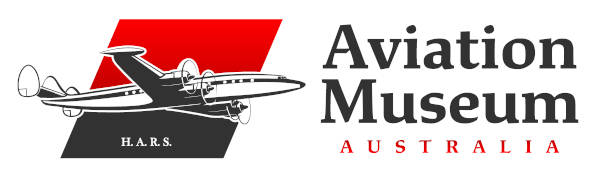

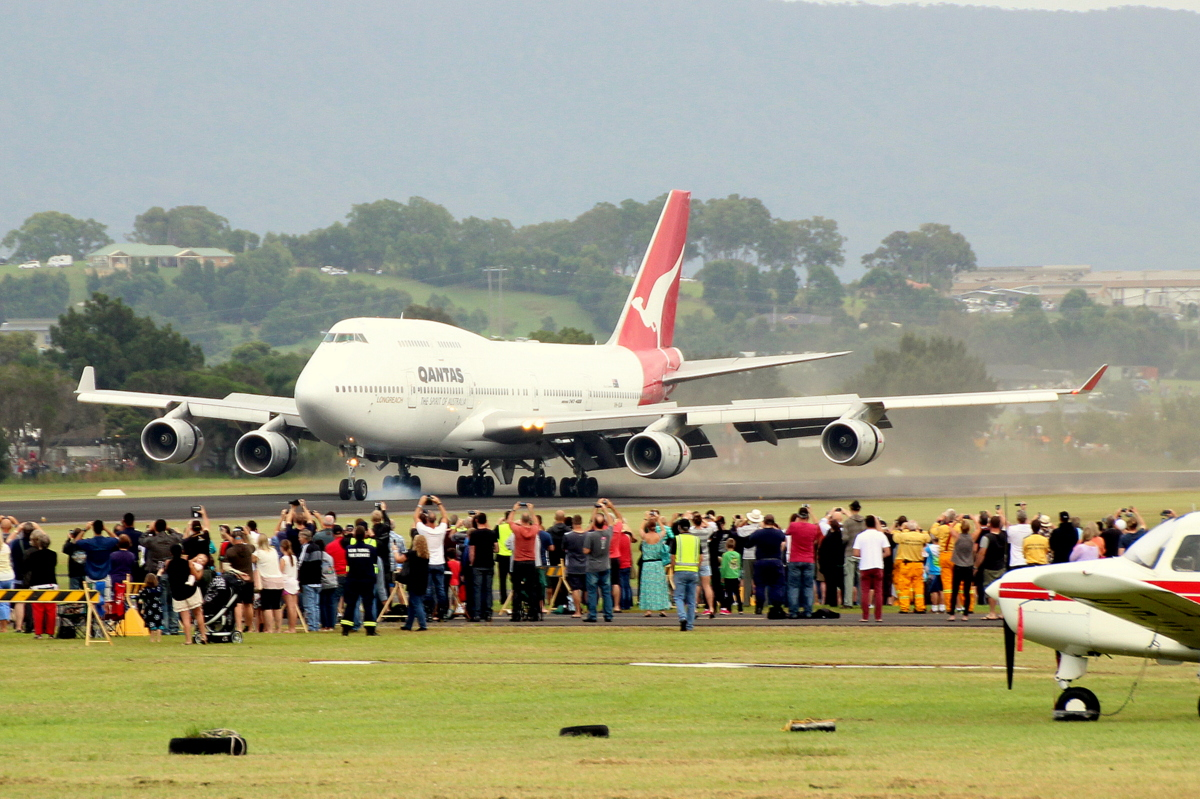
- Abbreviation: HARS
- Formation: 1979
- Type: Nonprofit
- Headquarters: Albion Park Rail, New South Wales, Australia
- Members: 800+
- President: Bob De La Hunty
- Publication: Phoenix Magazine
- Website: Official website

The Historical Aircraft Restoration Society, often referred to by its acronym, HARS, is an Australian-based aircraft restoration group. The group has two museums, at Shellharbour Airport and Parkes Airport in New South Wales, Australia.

== History ==
The Historical Aircraft Restoration Society was founded in 1979, by a collection of aviation enthusiasts with the goal of aiding in the preservation of Australia's aviation history. The organisation was established with the stated goal: "To recover and where possible restore to flying condition, aircraft or types of aircraft that have played a significant part in Australian Aviation History both in the Civil and Military arenas". In the organisation's beginnings, the small team of members of engaged in the search and recovery of aviation artefacts, many of which were from the Second World War. Artefacts recovered by the Historical Aircraft Restoration Society were key in many restoration projects worldwide, including a Bristol Beaufighter, which was under restoration by the United States Air Force Museum.

The first aircraft restored to flying condition by the Historical Aircraft Restoration Society was a North American T-6 Texan, formerly belonging to the Royal New Zealand Air Force, the aircraft was registered VH-HAR, and first flew in 1987. On the 1st of April, 1988, two Lockheed P-2 Neptunes (ex-A89-273, and ex-A89-281) were acquired from the Confederate Air Force Coral Sea Squadron, based out of Townsville.

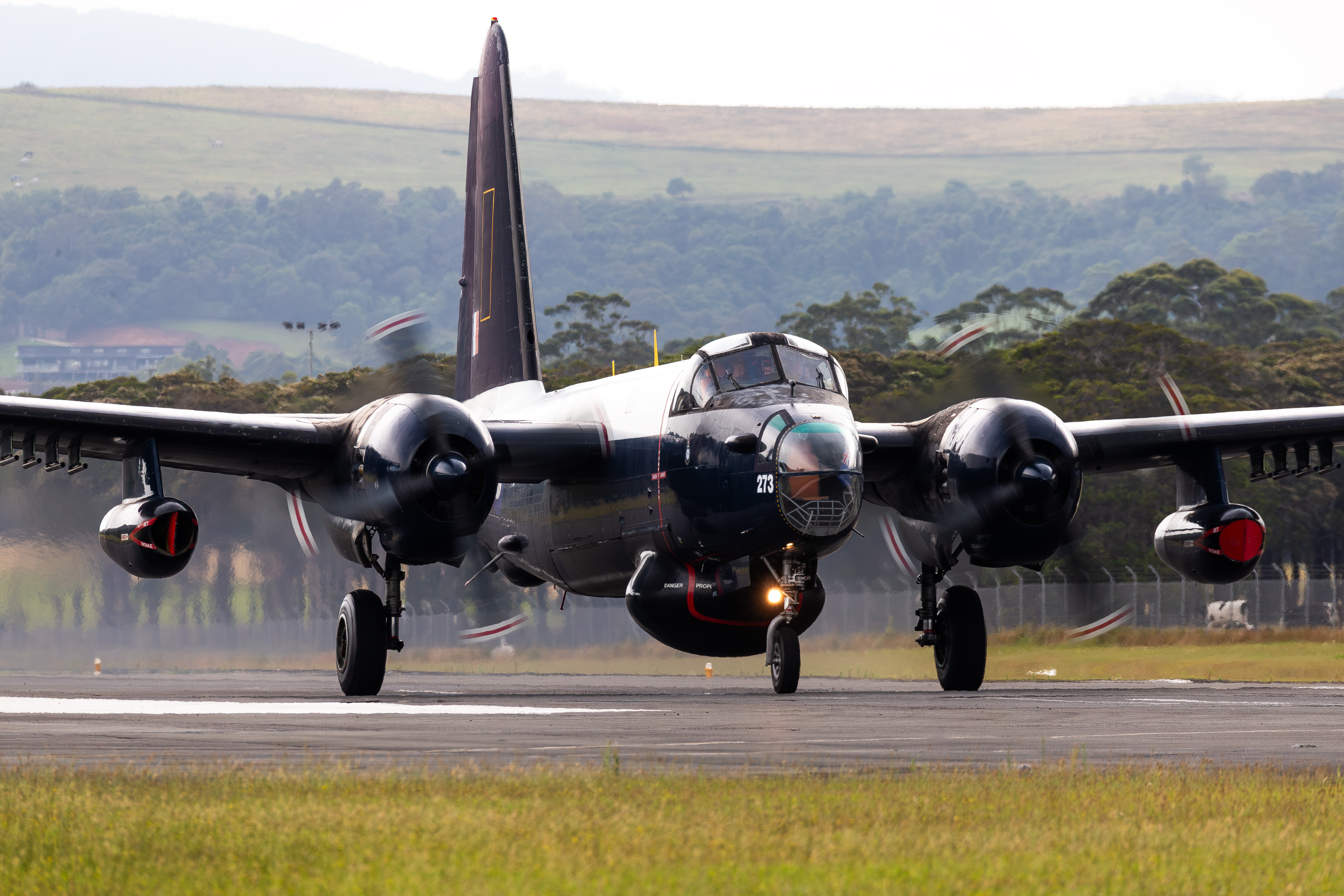
P-2 Neptune, VH-IOY, departing Shellharbour Airport, 2025

In 1988, as the organisation gained momentum, the Historical Aircraft Restoration Society transitioned into an incorporated society, with donations to the organisation gaining tax deductible status. In 1989, the Historical Aircraft Restoration Society acquired an additional P-2 Neptune, this aircraft (ex-147566), was a former French Navy example based out of Faaʼa International Airport in Tahiti. The initial intention behind the acquisition was to strip the aircraft for parts for the society's other P-2 Neptunes, however after viewing the aircraft's documentation and inspecting the airframe itself, the decision was made to restore the aircraft to flying condition, the aircraft was subsequently flown out of Tahiti to Albion Park, via Sydney.

"Connie" at Sydney Airport after her trans-pacific journey, 1996

In 1990, members of the Historical Aircraft Restoration Society were present at Davis–Monthan Air Force Base, ostensibly to collect spares for the society's P-2 Neptunes, it was there in which members spotted Lockheed C-121 Constellation 54–0157, which formerly belonged to the Pennsylvania Air National Guard. In what was described as a "moment of madness", members believed the aircraft should be restored and flown to Australia, due to the Constellation's historical significance to Australia, negotiations to acquire the aircraft commenced soon after. The aircraft itself had been deemed obsolete by the United States Air Force, with storage maintaince having ceased in 1981, the USAF deeming the aircraft of scrap value only. A failure to seal the aircraft after an inspection had allowed a large amount of birds to nest within the aircraft, the guano buildup from which had made scrap merchants hesitant to bid on the aircraft, due to the imperfections this would cause in the in the smelting of the aluminium. It was due to this, that HARS was allowed to acquire the aircraft, work to restore the aircraft subsequently began in 1991 at the Pima Air & Space Museum. On the 3rd of February 1996, the aircraft arrived at Sydney Airport, after a journey totalling 39.5 hours of flying time.

In February, 2015, Qantas Boeing 747-438 VH-OJA, named "City of Canberra", was donated to the Historical Aircraft Restoration Society, this aircraft set a record for the longest un-refuelled flight by a commercial aircraft in 1989, making it a significant aircraft for Australia's heritage. The aircraft was taken on by the society at Shellharbour Airport, after a delivery flight from Sydney Airport, spanning 12 minutes of total flight time. A significant amount of effort and planning was required to land the aircraft at Shellharbour Airport, due to the length and width of the airport's runway, HMAS Albatross being the planned diversion point were any incident to occur. The aircraft was opened as a static display soon after its arrival at Shellharbour Airport.

In 2016, the society acquired a Lockheed AP-3C Orion (ex A9-753), with the intention of operating the aircraft as an airworthy warbird. On the 12th of December, 2016, the aircraft was flown to Shellharbour Airport from RAAF Edinburgh, officially "awaiting disposal". On the 3rd of November, 2017, the aircraft was officially handed over to the society. It remains the only P-3 Orion flying as an operational warbird anywhere in the world.

N707JT under restoration at HARS.

On the 17th of May, 2017, actor John Travolta donated his privately owned ex-Qantas Boeing 707-138, named "Jett Clipper Ella" to the society. The arrival of the aircraft in Australia faced significant delays due to the COVID-19 pandemic, and a multitude of technical setbacks, which prevented the aircraft from being flown to Australia. In 2026, in the face of mounting costs, the decision was made to dismantle the aircraft, and transport it to Australia by sea. On the 9th of May 2026, the aircraft arrived at Port Kembla, and on the 21st of May, the aircraft was cleared from customs and trucked to Shellharbour Airport.

On the 17th of August, 2026, Qantas donated Fokker 100 VH-NPU to the society, the aircraft was delivered to the society at Shellharbour Airport after a delivery flight from Kalgoorlie-Boulder Airport. This followed the delivery of Fokker 100 VH-NHO to the society's Parkes facility in February 2026.

== Collection ==
Aircraft at the Shellharbour museum include:

- Auster Autocar - VH-NVY^{A}
- Bell UH-1
  - Bell UH-1B - VH-NVV, ex-N9-3014^{A}
  - Bell UH-1H - VH-X9S, ex-A2-703^{A}
- Boeing 707-138B 'Jett Clipper Ella' - N707JT^{R}
- Boeing 707-338C 'Windsor Town' (forward fuselage) - ex-A6-627, VH-EAG
- Boeing 747-438 'City of Canberra' - VH-OJA
- Bristol Beaufighter^{R}
- CAC Sabre
- CAC Winjeel - VH-EAD, ex-A85-435^{A}
- Cessna 310 - VH-REK^{A}
- Cessna 337^{R}
- Consolidated PBY Catalina - VH-PBZ^{A}
- Convair VC-131D Samaritan - ZS-ARV^{A}
- Dassault Mirage IIIO
- de Havilland Australia DHA-3 Drover
- de Havilland Canada DHC-4 Caribou
  - DHC-4 Caribou - VH-VBA, ex-A4-210^{A}
  - DHC-4 Caribou - VH-VBB, ex-A4-234^{A}
- de Havilland Sea Venom
- de Havilland Tiger Moth
- de Havilland Vampire
  - de Havilland Vampire T35 - A79-637^{R}
  - de Havilland Vampire T35 - A79-665^{R}
- Douglas C-47 Dakota
  - Douglas C-47D - VH-AES^{A}
  - Douglas C-47B - VH-EAF, ex-A65-94^{A}
  - Douglas C-47B - VH-EAE, ex-A65-95^{A}
- Douglas C-54 Skymaster
- Douglas DC-2^{R}
- English Electric Canberra
- Fokker 100 'Meekatharra' - VH-NPU
- Fokker F.27
  - Fokker F.27-1020 - VH-EWH, ex-ZK-BXH
  - Fokker F.27-6152 - VH-TQN, ex-N729FE
- Fokker F.VIIB/3m 'Southern Cross' (replica) - VH-USU^{A}
- General Dynamics F-111C
- Grumman S-2 Tracker
  - S-2G Tracker - VH-NXV, ex-N12-15333^{A}
  - S-2E Tracker - N12-153600
  - S-2G Tracker - N12-152812
- Hawker Sea Fury^{R}
- Let L-200 Morava
- Lockheed AP-3C Orion - VH-ORI, ex-A9-753^{A}
- Lockheed C-121 Constellation 'Connie' - VH-EAG, ex-54-0154^{A}
- Lockheed P-2 Neptune
  - SP-2H Neptune - VH-IOY, ex-A89-273^{A}
  - SP-2H Neptune - A89-281
  - SP-2H Neptune - VH-LRR, ex-147566^{A}
- Mikoyan-Gurevich MiG-15
- Mikoyan-Gurevich MiG-17
- Mikoyan-Gurevich MiG-21
- Piaggio P.166
- PZL TS-11 Iskra
- Scottish Aviation Twin Pioneer - VH-SYS^{A}

Aircraft at the Parkes museum include:

- Bell AH-1 Cobra
- Convair 580 - VH-PDW
- de Havilland Canada DHC-4 Caribou - A4-275
- de Havilland Heron - VH-AHB
- Fokker F100 - VH-NHO
- Lockheed AP-3C Orion - A9-759
- Lockheed P-2 Neptune
  - P2V-5 Neptune - A89-302
  - SP-2H Neptune - A89-272
- Westland Wessex - N7-203

^{A} aircraft kept in airworthy condition.

^{R} aircraft under restoration.

== See also ==
- List of aviation museums
