= Shellharbour Airport =

Airport serving the Illawarra, Australia

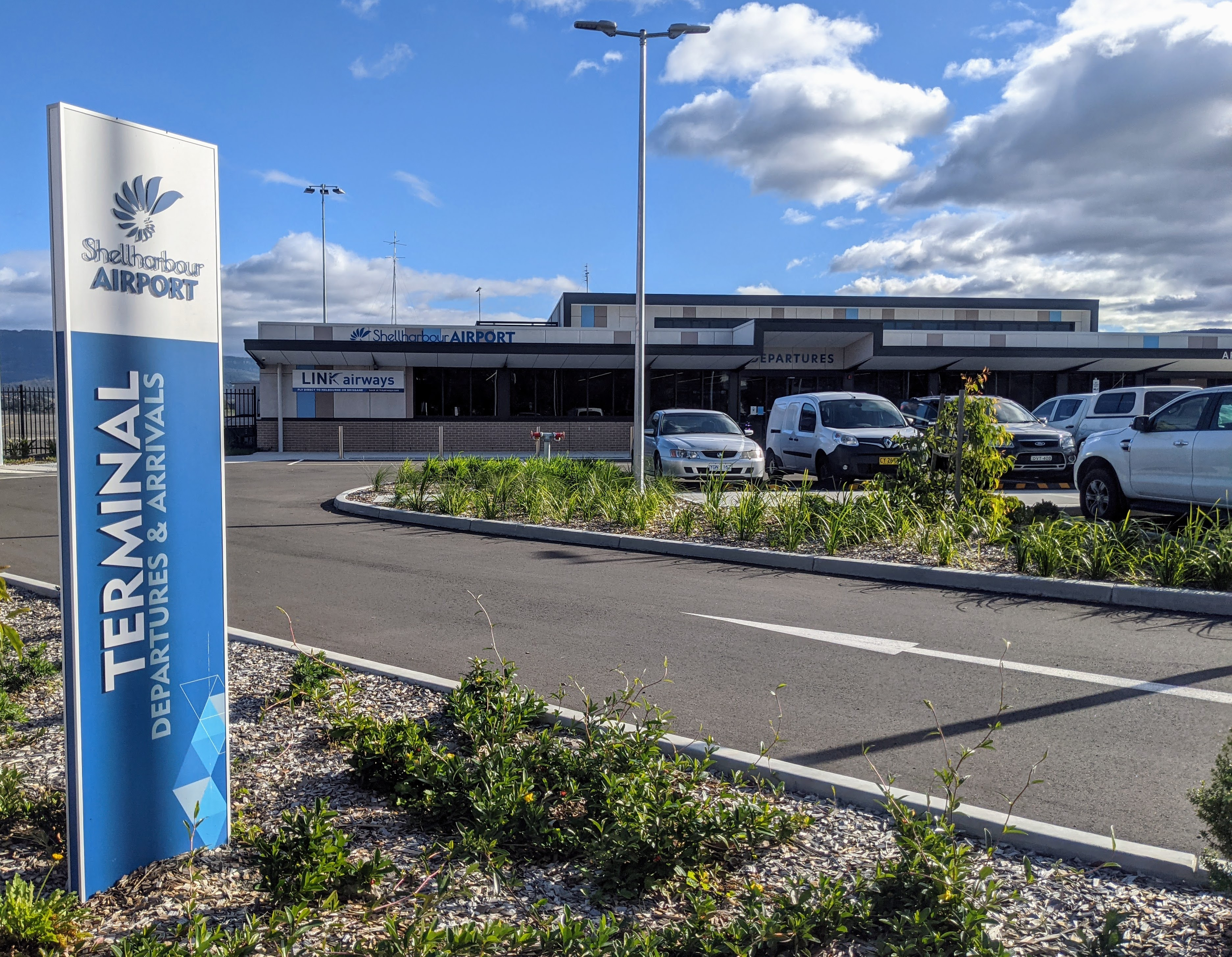
- Airport Terminal in 2021
- IATA: WOL; ICAO: YSHL

Summary
- Airport type: Public
- Owner/Operator: City of Shellharbour
- Serves: Wollongong, Illawarra Region
- Location: Albion Park Rail, New South Wales
- Elevation AMSL: 31 ft (9.4 m)
- Coordinates: 34°33′40″S 150°47′19″E
- Website: Official website

Map
- Location in New South Wales

Runways
Direction	Length		Surface
Direction	m	ft	Surface
08/26	1,331	4,367	Asphalt
16/34	1,819	5,968	Asphalt
- Sources: Australian AIP and aerodrome chart

Shellharbour Airport, formerly Illawarra Regional Airport, also known as Wollongong Airport and Albion Park Aerodrome (IATA: WOL, ICAO: YSHL) is an airport located in Albion Park Rail, New South Wales, Australia.

The Historical Aircraft Restoration Society is located at the airport. Link Airways operates services from the airport to Melbourne and Brisbane, four times weekly.

Various businesses operate out of Shellharbour Airport including Touchdown Helicopters, BIGWAVE Skydive, Performance Aviation (aircraft maintenance and pilot training), Toll Ambulance Rescue and Wollongong Aviation Fuels.

== Overview ==
The airport is owned and operated by Shellharbour City Council. It is located at the intersection of the Princes Highway and Illawarra Highway at Albion Park Rail. The airport is an 80-minute drive from Sydney Airport and 60 minutes from Sydney's southern suburbs.

The airport is home to the Historical Aircraft Restoration Society (HARS) and a range of tourism-related operations. Toll Group Ambulance Services have based one AW139 helicopter at the airport since 2017.

== History ==
=== World War II ===
As early as the 1920s, aviators had used fields in the Albion Park area for pleasure flights and demonstrations. RAAF Albion Park was built in 1942 as a Royal Australian Air Force (RAAF) Operational Base during World War II on land compulsorily acquired by the Australian Government. The base was used to conduct pilot training and was considered an important strategic asset in the defence of the Illawarra, particularly the steelworks at Port Kembla. Decorated fighter ace Clive Caldwell, a local resident, received RAAF training at the airfield. A satellite airfield was constructed north of Cordeaux Dam to support operations at Albion Park.

=== Post War ===
Following the war, Trans Australia Airlines and Australian National Airways linked the airport with Canberra and Melbourne until 1950. From 1952, South Coast Airways operated a milk run between Sydney and Melbourne with intermediate stops in Wollongong (Albion Park), Bairnsdale and Sale. Ownership of the airfield was transferred to the Shellharbour Municipal Council in 1962. Queen Elizabeth II and Prince Philip, Duke of Edinburgh visited the airport during a 1970 tour of Australia. Also during the 1970s, Southbank Aviation introduced commuter services from Albion Park to Newcastle and Canberra. The company would later relocate operations to Sydney, but Shellharbour Airport remained an important facility for pilot training and aircraft maintenance into the 1980s.

In 1990, the first master plan was prepared for the Shellharbour Airport (then named Illawarra Regional Airport), providing a framework for future management and developments when Shellharbour City Council assumed full responsibility for the operation of the airport. Throughout the 1990s, development of facilities continued, including the construction of a new passenger terminal and upgrades to roads and navigation aids at the airport. Impulse Airlines operated to the airport from Melbourne and Newcastle until August 2000. In 2002, the Historical Aircraft Restoration Society began relocating their collection of aircraft to Shellharbour Airport from Bankstown Airport in Sydney. Their hangar was completed in 2005, along with several other major upgrades, including the strengthening and reconstruction of runway 16/34 with better lighting, enhanced security, and the opening of Shellharbour City's Light Aeronautics Industry Cluster. Coinciding with this upgrade was the commencement of QantasLink services to Melbourne, although these were discontinued in 2008. In 2019, it was renamed from Illawarra Regional Airport to its present name.

In 2019, Shellharbour City Council secured $15.97 million in NSW Government funding, matched by a $4.35 million council contribution, for a $20.35 million upgrade project completed in 2021. Works included runway overlays, runway lighting for 08/26, a new passenger terminal, additional aircraft parking and foundations for an aviation business park.

== Airport facilities ==
The primary runway is 16/34, with a paved surface measuring 1,819 m × 30 m (5,968 ft × 98 ft). A displaced threshold reduces the available landing distance on runway 34 by 176 m (577 ft) to allow aircraft to clear high terrain along the approach path. 16/34 is equipped with pilot activated low intensity runway lighting, as well as precision approach path indicator systems to assist with landings under varying conditions.

The secondary runway 08/26 is restricted to aircraft with Maximum Takeoff Weights less than 7,500 kg (16,535 lb). Runway lighting was installed as part of the $20.35 million airport upgrade project completed in 2021, which included $350,000 specifically allocated for 08/26 lighting. Night operations on 08/26 remain restricted under the airport's Fly Neighbourly noise abatement procedures, with night training operations preferred on runway 16/34.

There is no control tower located at the airport and pilots must co-ordinate arrivals and departures using a Common Traffic Advisory Frequency, aided by an Aerodrome Frequency Response Unit (AFRU), which notifies pilots that their transmissions have been received on the frequency and activates lighting systems as appropriate. The nearest radio navigation aid for pilots is the Wollongong Non-Directional Beacon installation on 239 kHz, located within the airport boundary. Fuel is available for piston, turbine and jet powered aircraft and an automated weather service also operates at the airport.

Despite the length of the runway being sufficient for operating large passenger jets such as the Boeing 737, the pavements are currently only suitable for aircraft with a maximum takeoff weight not exceeding 25,000 kg (55,116 lb). This, as well as environmental and noise issues, limits the potential of Shellharbour Airport as a major gateway for commercial airline operations despite its proximity to Sydney. Despite this, Qantas donated City of Canberra, a Boeing 747-400 on 8 March 2015, where it made its final landing safely on the runway. Pilots trained on simulations for the landing and reduced the aircraft's weight including reducing the tyre pressure to 120 pounds per square inch from the typical 208, and carrying 25,400 litres of fuel, versus the maximum of 217,000 litres.

== Airlines and destinations ==
As of May 2026, there are no scheduled services to the airport.

Previously, the airport was served by QantasLink to Melbourne, discontinued in 2008, and JetGo to Melbourne (Essendon) and Brisbane using 36-50 seat Embraer ERJ regional jets. These services were short lived, lasting from 30 October 2017 until the airline ceased all operations on 1 June 2018.

Following the loss of Jetgo services, Link Airways commenced scheduled flights to Melbourne and Brisbane. using 34 seat Saab 340B+ turboprop aircraft. These flights were discontinued on 20 May 2026 with Link citing rising fuel costs and falling demand.

== Historical Aircraft Restoration Society ==
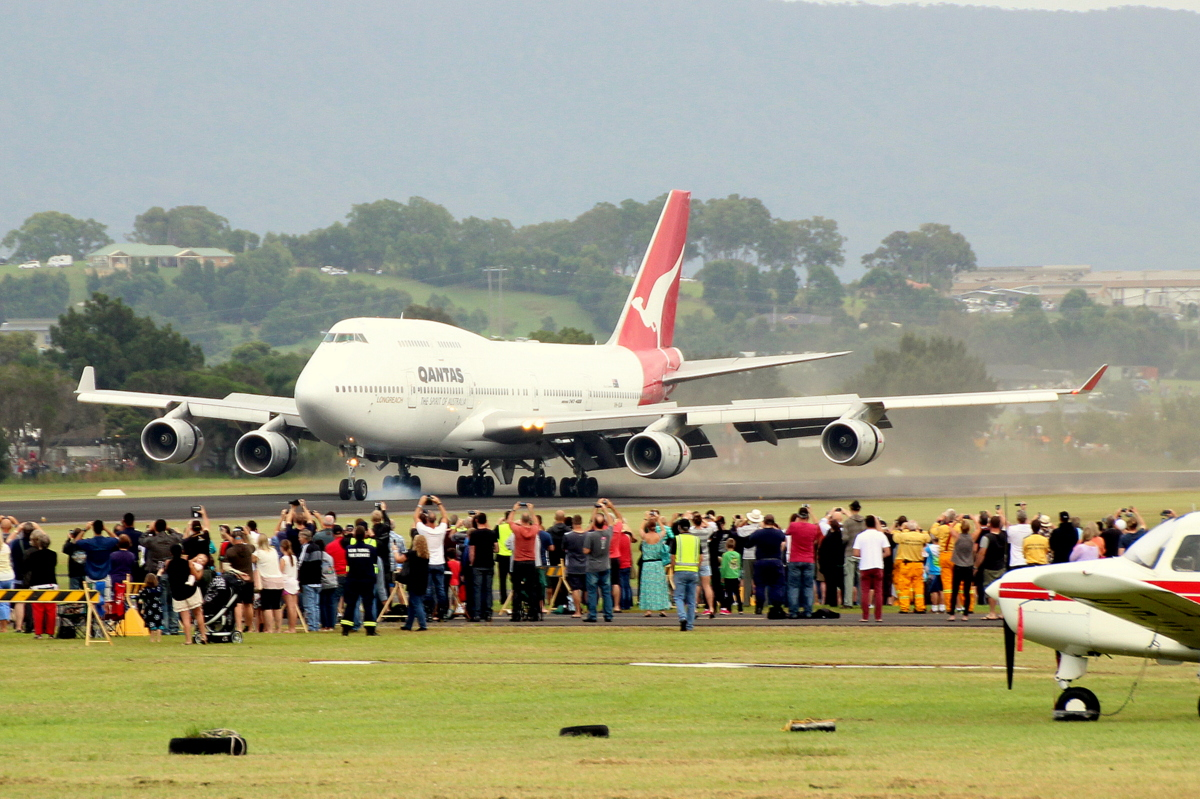
Boeing 747-438, City of Canberra, landing at the airport

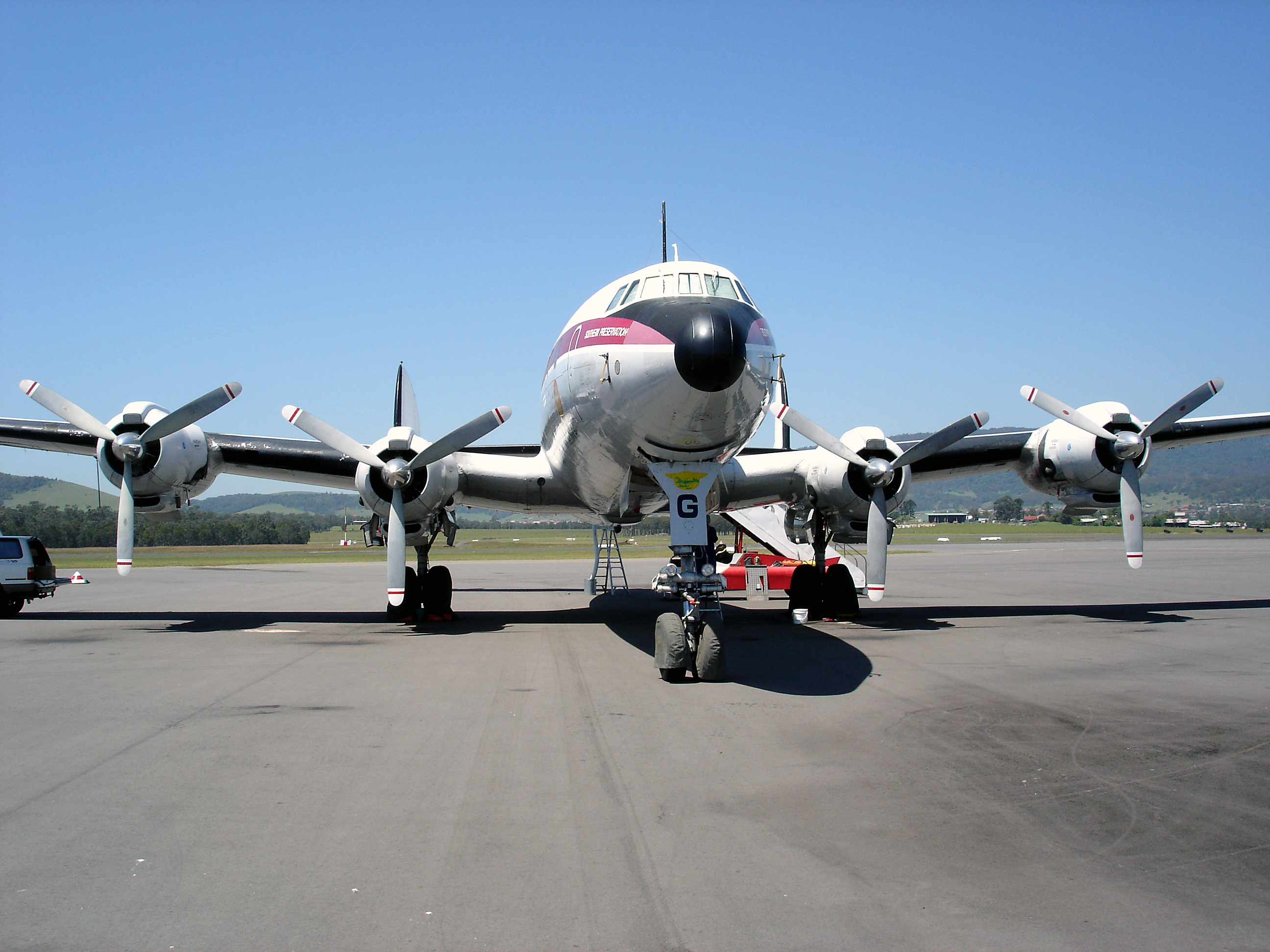
Lockheed Super Constellation nicknamed Connie

The Historical Aircraft Restoration Society (HARS) is based at Wollongong Airport. HARS was formed in 1979 by a group of aviation enthusiasts interested in the preservation of Australian Aviation History. Its mission is "To recover and where possible restore to flying condition, aircraft or types of aircraft that have played a significant part in Australian Aviation History both in the Civil and Military arenas".

== Ground transport ==
The airport is serviced by the 37, 57 and 77 bus routes operated by Premier Illawarra, which stop close to the passenger terminal and connect to various locations including Wollongong City Centre, Shellharbour City Centre, Dapto and Warrawong. A regular rail service is available at Albion Park railway station, 900 metres from the passenger terminal, on the South Coast Line. A bus route stopping directly at the passenger terminal was trialled and discontinued in 2018.

== Accidents and incidents ==
- On 18 December 1961, a Bristol 170 registration VH-AAH operated by Pacific Aviation crashed into trees near the airport during a training flight at Albion Park. The crew were unable to recover after power was lost during a simulated engine failure. All four on board survived the accident.
- On 2 April 1989, a Piper PA-60 Sequoia aircraft, registration VH-NOE crashed into the sea off Bass Point, to the east of Illawarra Regional Airport. The charter flight from Sydney was intended to pick up passengers at Wollongong and continue onwards to Nowra and Canberra. By the time of the accident, the passengers had already contacted the Sydney-based operator to cancel the charter, but the aircraft had departed before this could be communicated to the pilot. It is believed the aircraft struck the ocean in poor weather while attempting an instrument approach to the airport. Some debris was later located, but the main wreckage and the remains of the pilot, the only person on board, were never recovered.
- On 11 October 2025, a Piper PA-32R, registration VH-JVA, was engaged in a private flight from Shellharbour Airport to Bathurst Airport when the aircraft stalled and crashed during takeoff. All three of the aircraft's occupants were killed and the aircraft was destroyed.

== See also ==
- List of airports in New South Wales
