= Holden (surname) =

Holden is a surname. It may refer to:

== People ==
=== A ===
- Alexandra Holden (born 1977), American actress
- Albert Fairchild Holden (1866–1913), founder of Holden Arboretum in Kirtland, Ohio
- Amanda Holden (born 1971), English actress
- Amanda Holden (writer) (1948–2021), British music writer and translator
- Andy Holden (footballer) (born 1962), Welsh footballer
- Andy Holden (artist) (born 1982), English artist
- Andy Holden (athlete) (1948–2014), English long-distance runner John Andrew Holden
- Anthony Holden (1947–2023), British journalist
- Arthur Holden (footballer), English footballer

=== B ===
- Bernard Holden (1908–2012), British railway engineer
- Beverly Holden, All-American Girls Professional Baseball League player
- Bill Holden (baseball) (1889–1971), American baseball player
- Bill Holden (footballer) (1928–2011), English footballer
- Bill Holden (ice hockey) (born 1949), Canadian ice hockey player
- Bill Holden (schoolteacher) (born 1948), American schoolteacher and juvenile diabetes activist
- Bob Holden (born 1949), Governor of Missouri
- Bob Holden (racing driver) (born 1932), Australian racing driver

=== C ===
- Charles Holden (1875–1960), British architect
- Cliff Holden (1919–2020), English painter, designer, and silk-screen printer
- Clive Holden, Canadian multimedia artist and poet
- Constance Holden (1941–2010), American science journalist
- Craig Holden (footballer) (born 1957), Australian rules footballer

=== D ===
- David Holden (journalist) (1924–1977) British writer, journalist, and broadcaster
- David Holden (screenwriter) American TV producer and playwright
- Dean Holden (born 1979), Northern Irish professional football player
- Doug Holden (1930–2021), English footballer

=== E ===
- Edith Holden (1871–1920), British artist and art teacher
- Edward Holden (disambiguation)

=== F ===
- Frances Gillam Holden (1843–1924), Australian nurse, suffragist and writer
- Frankie J. Holden a.k.a. Frank Holden (born 1952), Australian entertainer

=== G ===
- Genevieve Holden (1919–2007), American novelist
- Gina Holden (born 1975), Canadian actress
- Gloria Holden (1908–1991), English actress

=== H ===
- Helge Holden (born 1956), Norwegian mathematician
- Hendrick S. Holden (1849–1918), American politician and banker from New York
- Henry Holden (police officer) (1823–1900), English police officer and cricketer
- Henry James Holden (1859–1926), South Australian mayor and businessman whose company became the car maker Holden
- Hubert Ashton Holden (1822–1896), English classical scholar

=== I ===
- Isaac Holden (1807–1897), Scottish inventor and manufacturer

=== J ===
- Jack Holden (disambiguation)
- James Holden (disambiguation)
- Jan Holden (1931–2005), English actress
- Jennifer Holden (1936–2022), American actress
- Joanne M. Holden (born 1974), American food scientist
- Jody Holden (born 1968), Canadian beach volleyball player
- John Holden (disambiguation)
- Jon Robert Holden (born 1976), US-born naturalized Russian basketball player
- Jonathan Holden (1941–2024), American poet, first poet laureate of Kansas
- Josh Holden (born 1978), Canadian professional ice hockey center

=== K ===
- Kip Holden (Melvin Lee Holden; 1952–2025), American politician
- Kisha B. Holden, American professor of psychiatry

=== L ===
- Lansing C. Holden (1858–1930), an architect
- Lansing Colton Holden Jr. (1896–1938), an aviator
- Laurie Holden (born 1972), American actress
- Les Holden, Australian aviator
- Lewis Holden, New Zealand economist
- Louisa Virginia Harrison Holden (1830–1900), American civic leader

=== M ===
- Margaret Holden (died 1998), British botanist and biochemist
- Mari Holden (born 1971), American cycle racer
- Marjean Holden, American actress
- Mark Holden (born 1954), Australian singer and television personality
- Mark Holden (born 1962), British-born Canadian actor and produced
- Max Holden (born 1997), English cricketer
- Max Holden (1884–1949), American stage magician and vaudeville performer
- Mel Holden (1954–1981), Scottish footballer
- Michael Holden (born 1968), British heavyweight boxer
- Moses Holden (1777–1864), English astronomer

=== N ===
- Nate Holden (1929–2025), American politician
- Nick Holden (born 1987), Canadian ice hockey defenceman

=== O ===
- Oliver Holden (1765–1844), American composer and compiler of hymns

=== P ===
- P. J. Holden (born 1969), Northern Irish comic artist
- Perry Greeley Holden (1865–1959), first professor of agronomy in the United States

=== R ===
- Randall Holden, founding settler of both Portsmouth and Warwick, Rhode Island
- Rebecca Holden (born 1958), American actress, singer, and entertainer
- Reuben A. Holden III (1890–1967), American tennis player
- Richard Holden (dancer) (1927–2015), American dancer and choreographer
- Richard Holden (Canadian politician) (1931–2005), Canadian lawyer and member of the National Assembly of Quebec
- Richard Holden (British politician), Member of Parliament from 2019
- Rick Holden (born 1964), English footballer
- Rob Holden (born 1956), British accountant
- Robert Holden (disambiguation)

=== S ===
- S. D. Holden (1870–1917), British engineer, son of engineer James Holden
- Stewart Holden (born 1979), British competitive Scrabble player
- Stuart Holden (born 1985), Scottish/American football player
- Svein Holden, Norwegian criminal prosecutor

=== T ===
- Thomas Holden (disambiguation)
- Tim Holden (1957–2026), United States politician Thomas Timothy Holden
- Tony Holden (director), television producer and director
- Tore Holden (born 1946), Norwegian ice hockey referee and television personality
- Traeshon Holden (born 2001), American football player

=== W ===
- Wendy Holden (author, born 1961), British journalist and author
- Wendy Holden (author, born 1965), British author of humorous novels
- Will Holden (American football) (born 1993), American football offensive tackle
- William Holden (disambiguation)

== Fictional characters ==
- Caroline Holden, in the television series Baywatch, portrayed by Yasmine Bleeth
- Claudia Joy Holden, from Army Wives
- Jim Holden, in The Expanse science fiction novel series
- Judge Holden, in Cormac McCarthy's novel Blood Meridian
- Martha Holden, in the soap opera Home and Away, portrayed by Jodi Gordon
- Max Holden, from One Live to Live
- Michael Holden (character), in the television series Army Wives
- Tony Holden, in the Australian television soap opera Home and Away, portrayed by Jon Sivewright
- Will Holden (EastEnders), in the soap opera EastEnders
- The Holdens, one of the One Life to Live minor families

== See also ==
- Holden (disambiguation)
