= Holden (disambiguation) =

Holden was an Australian subsidiary of General Motors.

Holden may also refer to:

== Places ==
=== Norway ===
- Holden (Lierne), a lake in Lierne Municipality in Trøndelag county
- Holden (Steinkjer), a lake in Steinkjer Municipality in Trøndelag county
- Holden, the former name of Holla Municipality in Telemark county

=== United States ===
- Holden, Louisiana, an unincorporated community
- Holden, Maine, a town
- Holden, Massachusetts, a town
- Holden, Missouri, a city
- Holden Beach, North Carolina, a small incorporated seaside town south of Wilmington, NC
- Holden, North Dakota, an unorganized territory
- Holden, Ohio, an unincorporated community
- Holden, Utah, a town
- Holden, West Virginia, a census-designated place
- Holden Township, Minnesota
- Holden Township, Adams County, North Dakota, a defunct township

=== Other ===
- Holden Nunataks, four nunataks in Palmer Land, Antarctica
- Holden, Alberta, Canada, a village
- Holden Lake, Ontario, Canada
- Holden Park, in the village of Oakworth, West Yorkshire, England

=== Extraterrestrial ===
- Holden (lunar crater)
- Holden (Martian crater)
- 2974 Holden, an asteroid

== People and fictional characters ==
- Holden (surname), including a list of people and fictional characters
- Holden (given name), including a list of people and fictional characters
- Holden (singer) (born 2000), Italian singer-songwriter and record producer
- Holden Scott, a pen name of American author Ben Mezrich (born 1969)

== Business ==
- Holden New Zealand, a sales subsidiary for General Motors
- Holden Outerwear, a brand of snowboarding-related clothing
- Holden Foundation Seeds, an American company that specializes in the research, development and production of foundation seed corn
- Holdens Brewery, Sedgley, Staffordshire, England

== Other uses ==
- Holden baronets, three titles in the Baronetage of the United Kingdom, two of which are extant
- Holden (band), a French pop-rock band
- Holden Arboretum, Kirtland, Ohio
- Holden Chapel, the third-oldest building at Harvard University
- Holden Choirs, the collective name of Harvard University's Harvard Glee Club, Radcliffe Choral Society, and Harvard-Radcliffe Collegium Musicum
- Holden Lutheran Church Parsonage, Kenyon, Minnesota, on the National Register of Historic Places
- Holden Medical Institute, an American accredited nursing school
- Holden railway station, Melbourne, Victoria, Australia
- Holdens railway station, Woodville, South Australia
- Holden High School (disambiguation), various schools

== See also ==
- Holden Beach, North Carolina
- Holdenville, Oklahoma
- Holden Heights, Florida
- Holden Village, Washington
- Holder (disambiguation)
- Holding (disambiguation)
- Houlden
