= Henry Holden =

Henry Holden may refer to:

- Henry Holden (theologian) (1596–1662), English Roman Catholic priest and theologian
- Henry Holden (police officer) (1823–1900), English chief constable and cricketer
- H. J. Holden (1859–1926), Australian businessman
- Henry Smith Holden (1887–1963), British botanist

== See also ==
- Harry Holden (disambiguation)
