= Robert Holden =

Robert Holden may refer to:

- Robert Holden (landscape architect), British landscape architect
- Robert Holden (author) (born 1964), psychologist, author, and broadcaster
- Bob Holden (born 1949), American politician
- Bob Holden (racing driver) (born 1932), Australian racing driver
- Bob Holden, character in Aloma of the South Seas (1926 film)
- Robert Holden (motorcyclist) (1958–1996), motorcycle road racer from New Zealand
- Robert Holden (photographer), American photographer
- Robert Holden (politician) (born 1951), American graphic designer and politician
- Robert Holden (cricketer) (1805–1872), English cricketer and British Army officer
- Rob Holden (born 1956), British accountant
