= William Holden (disambiguation) =

William Holden (1918–1981) was an American film actor.

William Holden may also refer to:

- William Holden (character actor) (1862–1932), American actor
- William Holden (journalist) (1808–1897), writer for South Australian Register and Adelaide Observer
- William Woods Holden (1818–1892), governor of North Carolina
- William Holden (politician) (c.1824–1884), lieutenant governor of California
- William Holden (cricketer) (1883–1949), New Zealand cricketer
- William Holden (footballer) (1860–?), English footballer
- Bill Holden (baseball) (1889–1971), American baseball player
- William Curry Holden (1898–1983), American archaeologist, museum curator and historian
- Bill Holden (footballer) (1928–2011), English footballer
- Bill Holden (schoolteacher) (born 1948), American schoolteacher and juvenile diabetes activist
- Bill Holden (speedway rider) (1923–2011), British speedway rider.
- Bill Holden (ice hockey) (born 1949), Canadian ice hockey player
- Will Holden (American football) (born 1993), American football offensive tackle
- Will Holden (EastEnders), EastEnders character
