= Houlden =

Houlden is a surname. Notable people with the surname include:

- Jordan Houlden (born 1998), British diver
- Leslie Houlden (1929–2022), British Anglican priest and academic

== See also ==
- Holden (surname)
- Moulden
