= James Alexander Holden =

Australian businessman

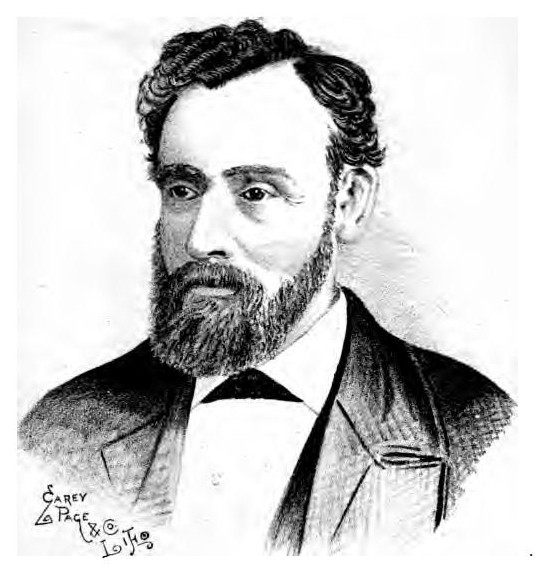

Personal details
- Born: James Alexander Holden; 4 January 1835 Walsall, United Kingdom (part of Staffordshire at the time)
- Died: 6 January 1887 (aged 52)
- Spouse: Mary Elizabeth Phillips (m. 1857, died)
- Occupation: Businessman

James Alexander Holden (1 April 1835 – 1 June 1887) was the businessman who founded the South Australian company which eventually produced the Holden automobile.

== History ==
James Alexander Holden was born in Walsall (at that time in Staffordshire), the younger son of Edward Holden, saddler and hardware merchant, and Eliza (née Huskinson). Their elder son was Edward Thomas Holden, later Sir Edward, industrialist and, briefly, Liberal MP for Walsall. James's mother died when he was quite young, and something like enmity developed between him and his father's new wife.

Then in 1851 his father died, leaving his business to his second wife and the older son, and James was urged by George Fife Angas to forge a new life in the new colony of South Australia. But first he sailed to America, where he was hospitably received by his mother's sister, then after a few years reached Adelaide, arriving in 1852, just as half the male population of South Australia was trying its luck in the goldfields of the neighbouring colony of Victoria.

He found rented accommodation, and employment with chemist F. H. Faulding. In 1853 his cousin Edwin Thomas Smith emigrated to South Australia aboard the California and with help from Holden began importing ironmongery. In 1856 he set up in business as J. A. Holden & Co., merchants and wholesale saddlers, selling imported and locally made (no doubt from his brother) saddles, whips and harnesses. His business flourished, and in 1857 he married his landlady's daughter and purchased a four-roomed cottage in Beulah Park. They later moved into a larger home in Magill, then a year later sold up both places for a Kensington Park property of 15 acres (6.1 ha), where in 1871 the original cottage was replaced with a seven roomed residence, with substantial additions in 1875.

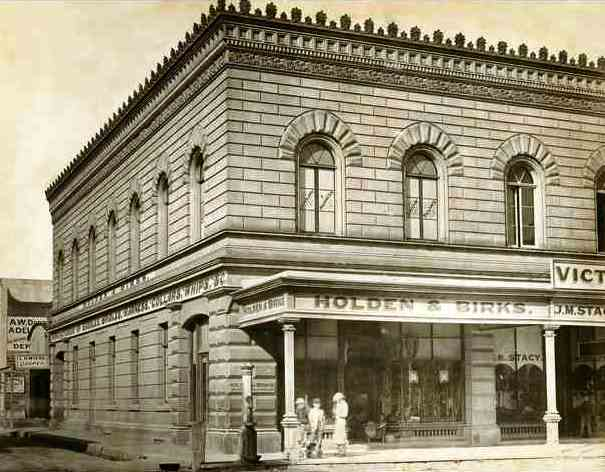
Holden & Birks in Rundle Street

The business also went through a succession of addresses, from the original leased premises at the corner of King William and Rundle Street in 1856 then larger premises at 34 King William Street in 1859. The business, which became J. A. Holden & Co. in 1863, moved to a building in Gawler Place, which he purchased in 1865. A contract to supply carts and other equipment for the Overland Telegraph Line project's 165 horses and 210 bullocks was a major factor in the expansion of the business. From October 1871 to May 1874 Alfred James Birks was a partner in a subsidiary retail business, termed Holden & Birks, owning premises on Rundle Street at the south west corner of Gawler Place.

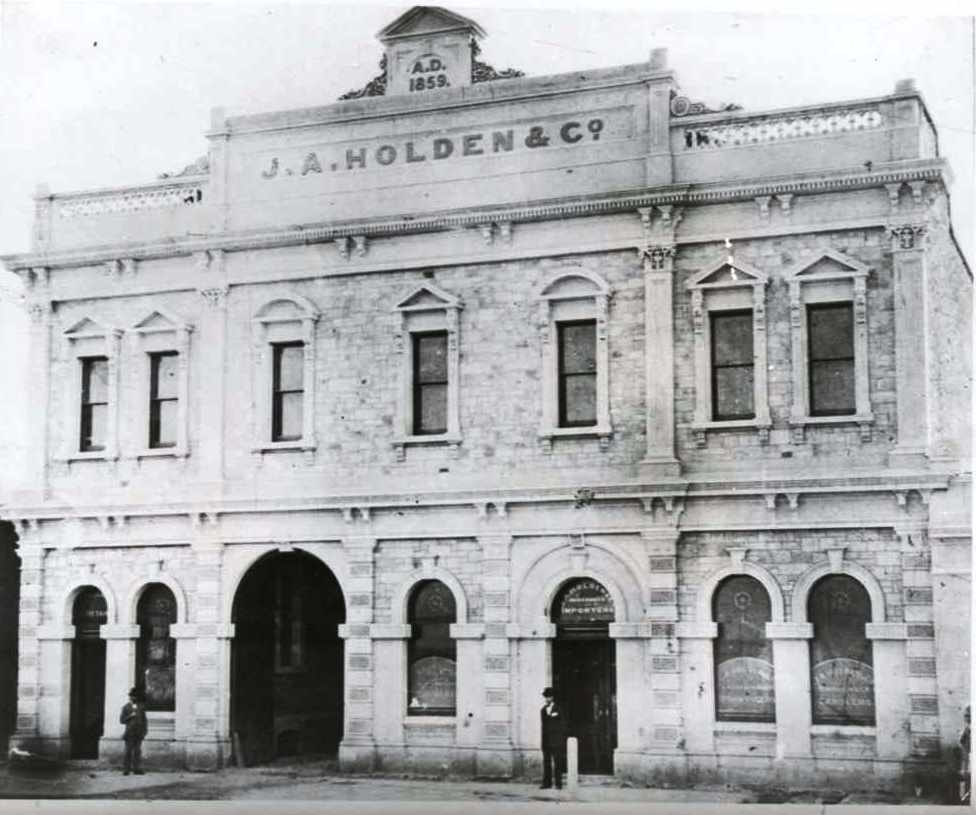
J. A. Holden & Co., 100 Grenfell Street

In May 1879 J. A. Holden & Co. moved to a two-storey building in Grenfell Street and brought in his son Henry as partner. He sold the Gawler Place property to D & W Murray and the Rundle Street premises to Birks. Around the same time, saddler H. A. Frost joined the firm. On 1 May 1884 James took Frost into partnership in the business, which was in financial difficulties. In August 1885 J. A. Holden sold to his son H. J. Holden and H. A. Frost his interest in the retail arm of the company, which in November 1885 became Holden & Frost. In 1886 J. A. Holden was declared insolvent. He put the wholesale arm of the business on the open market as well as the Grenfell Street warehouse. He put his Kensington Park house and grounds on the market for urgent sale. Under the terms of the voluntary liquidation, Holden & Frost continued to operate from the premises at 100 Grenfell Street until they were once again solvent, and the building was purchased by Harris Scarfe in 1923.

J. A. Holden died somewhat less than two years later, of tuberculosis complicated by alcohol abuse.

Frost died in 1909, and Henry James Holden purchased Frost's equity in the business from his estate, becoming sole proprietor.

== Other interests ==
He was one of the founders of the South Australian Chamber of Manufactures and represented South Australia in several trade missions sent to Britain and Europe. He was an active member of the Baptist Church.

== Family ==
James Alexander Holden (1 April 1835 – 1 June 1887) married Mary Elizabeth Phillips (9 December 1839 – 17 April 1914) on 24 September 1857; they lived at "Cambrian Cottage", Kensington, South Australia. Their children included:

- Henry James Holden (18 July 1859 – 6 March 1926) married Mary Anne Dixon "Polly" Wheewall (16 March 1860 – 1926) on 7 April 1881. He was councillor and mayor of Norwood for three years, lived at "Warrinilla", 92 Osmond Tce., Norwood.

- Sir Edward Wheewall Holden (14 August 1885 – 17 June 1947) married Hilda May Lavis (1887 – 6 August 1967) on 18 March 1908. He was a noted industrialist, lived at "Kalymna", 28 Dequetteville Terrace, Kent Town.

- Margaret Helen Holden (25 September 1909 – 12 October 2000) married I. Macdonald ( – )
- Nancy Eileen Holden (12 November 1912 – 4 September 2005) married Frank C. Buttfield ( – ) on 19 February 1936. As Nancy Buttfield DBE she was a prominent Senator for South Australia.

- son (27 March 1938 – )
- son (28 April 1940 – )

- John James "Jim" Holden (16 March 1919 – 30 November 2012) was RAAF pilot.

- Ida Caroline M(ary) Holden (20 July 1888 – ) married Leslie Wiles Peacock (1882–1960) on 21 April 1909. Leslie was a grandson of Wiles Peacock (c. 1817–1889), conveyancer and distiller.
- Florence Muriel Holden (4 May 1890 – 1950) married William J. Shaughnessy, lived at Victor Harbor
- Dorothy Edith Holden (19 August 1893 – ) married Dr. Reginald A(rthur) Haste ( – ) on 10 April 1919
- William Arthur Holden (17 December 1899 – 22 December 1929) married Marjorie Reeves, daughter of elocutionist Edward Reeves.

- Ellen Elizabeth "Nellie" Holden (14 January 1863 – 28 November 1934) married George Gordon Gibbs (c. 1860 – 24 August 1921) of Harvey River Station on 31 December 1885, died at Harvey, Western Australia. He was a land agent with Burns, Philp and Co. and brother of Herbert William Gibbs (c. 1852 – 4 October 1940), father of May Gibbs.
- Winifred Mary Holden (28 April 1865 – 12 November 1941) married Herbert James Preston OBE (30 June 1863 – before April 1948) on 2 April 1885, lived 15 Shellcove Road. Neutral Bay, New South Wales. He was Australian manager for Nestlé condensed milk.
- Hubert William "Bill" Holden (3 June 1867 – 25 January 1935) married Annie Turner (1867–1957) on 22 July 1891

- Captain Leslie Hubert "Les" "Lucky" "Homing pigeon" Holden MC (6 March 1895 – 18 September 1932) owner Holdens Air Transport Services, killed in plane crash. His father took over the business.
- Sir James Robert Holden (1 February 1903 – 1977) director of GMH's SA operations, knighted 1963, retired a few years later.

- Mignon Holden (1929– )

- Winifred Turner Holden, married Norman Hunter Graham

- Anne Graham, married John Cooke

- Richard Cooke (author of The Last Best Place On The Internet: A Human History of Wikipedia)

- Nell Holden

- Mabel Janet Holden (11 February 1871 – 1896) married George S. Lindsay ( – ) on 5 December 1895
- Collingrove Holden (1874–1946) born in England, married Violet Ethel Crocker (1888–1967)
- (Charlotte) Alice Lynette Holden (24 January 1877 – ) married Lawrence Arthur Irving ( – ) on 16 April 1904
