= Hobden =

Hobden is a surname. Notable people with the surname include:

- Dennis Hobden (1920–1995), British politician
- Matt Hobden (1993–2016), English cricketer

== See also ==
- Holden (surname)
