= Edward Holden (disambiguation) =

Sir Edward Holden (1885–1947) was an Australian vehicle manufacturer.

Edward Holden may also refer to:

- Edward Anthony Holden (1805–1877), English landowner
- Edward F. Holden (1901–1925), American mineralogist
- Edward S. Holden (1846–1914), American astronomer
- Edward Thomas Holden (1831–1926), British businessman and Liberal politician
- Sir Edward Holden, 1st Baronet (1848–1919), British banker and Liberal politician
