= Ron Santo =

American baseball player (1940–2010)

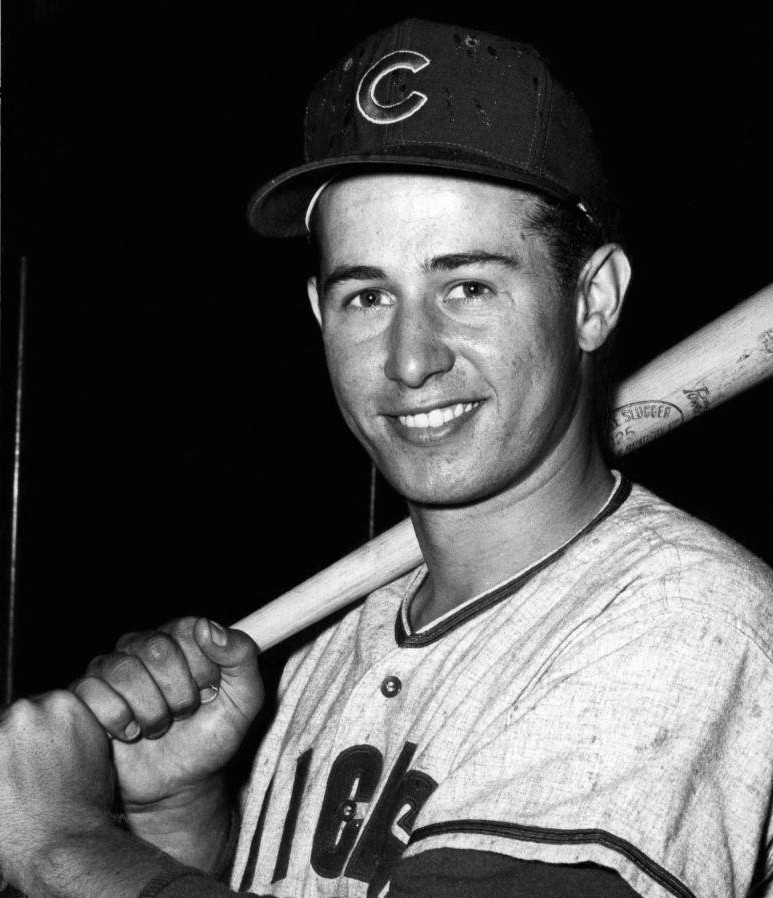
- Santo with the Chicago Cubs in 1961
- Third baseman
- Born: February 25, 1940; Seattle, Washington, U.S.
- Died: December 3, 2010 (aged 70); Scottsdale, Arizona, U.S.
- Batted: Right Threw: Right

MLB debut
- June 26, 1960, for the Chicago Cubs

Last MLB appearance
- September 29, 1974, for the Chicago White Sox

MLB statistics
- Batting average: .277
- Hits: 2,254
- Home runs: 342
- Runs batted in: 1,331
- Stats at Baseball Reference

Teams
- Chicago Cubs (1960–1973); Chicago White Sox (1974)

Career highlights and awards
- 9× All-Star (1963–1966, 1968, 1969, 1971–1973); 5× Gold Glove Award (1964–1968); Chicago Cubs No. 10 retired; Chicago Cubs Hall of Fame

Member of the National

Baseball Hall of Fame
- Induction: 2012
- Vote: 93.8%
- Election method: Golden Era Committee

Ronald Edward Santo (February 25, 1940 – December 3, 2010) was an American Major League Baseball (MLB) third baseman who played for the Chicago Cubs from 1960 through 1973 and the Chicago White Sox in 1974. In 1990, Santo became a member of the Cubs broadcasting team providing commentary for Cubs games on WGN radio and remained at that position until his death in 2010. In 1999, he was selected to the Cubs All-Century Team. He was inducted into the National Baseball Hall of Fame in 2012.

Santo was an All-Star for nine seasons during his 15-year career. He led the National League (NL) in triples one time, in walks four times, and in on-base percentage two times. He batted .300 or more and hit 30 or more home runs four times each, and is the only third baseman in MLB history to post eight consecutive seasons with over 90 runs batted in (RBI) (1963–70).

He also was a Gold Glove Award winner for five consecutive seasons. He led the NL in total chances eight times, in games, putouts and assists seven times each, and in double plays six times. From 1966 to 1974, he held the NL record for assists in a single season. He also set NL records for career assists (4,532), total chances (6,777) and double plays (389) at third base, all of which were eventually broken between 1986 and 1988 by Mike Schmidt. His NL total of 2,102 games at third base is 52 short of Eddie Mathews' league record, and he ranks sixth in putouts (1,930) and ninth in fielding percentage (.954).

Santo enjoyed his success despite battling diabetes since he was a teenager, a condition which was concealed from the public until 1971; it eventually necessitated the amputation of the lower half of both his legs. Since 1979, Santo endorsed the Juvenile Diabetes Research Foundation's annual Ron Santo Walk to Cure Diabetes in Chicago. He helped raise over $65 million for the foundation. In 2002, he was named the Juvenile Diabetes Research Foundation's "Person of the Year."

== Early life ==
Santo was raised in southeast Seattle, attending Franklin High School, and played newly organized youth baseball in the Babe Ruth League. He grew up near Sicks Stadium, home of the Pacific Coast League's Seattle Rainiers, and had summer jobs there as a batboy, groundskeeper and clubhouse attendant, while playing three sports in high school. At age 14 he made the Seattle all-star team that advanced to the 1954 Babe Ruth World Series. In a game at Washington DC Stadium, Santo was inserted at first base, by Coach Dave Tacher, to replace a 15-year-old player who broke his thumb. In that game Santo hit a grand slam over the 354 foot mark in left center field and the Washington All Stars defeated Tennessee.

== Major league career ==
=== Chicago Cubs (1960–1973) ===
Santo was signed as a free agent by the Chicago Cubs in 1959, and made his debut on June 26, 1960. In 1961 he set a Cubs record with 41 double plays at third base, breaking the previous mark of 33 set by Bernie Friberg in 1923. In 1962 he led the National League in assists for the first time with 332, setting the team record for assists at third base, breaking the mark of 323 set by Randy Jackson in 1951. Santo continued to lead the NL in assists every year through 1968, breaking Ned Williamson's major league record of leading the league six times; Brooks Robinson went on to lead the American League eight times. Mike Schmidt eventually tied Santo's NL mark of seven. In 1963 Santo broke the modern NL record with 374 assists at third base, passing Tommy Leach's 1904 mark of 371. In 1966, he set the all-time league record with 391, the previous record being Billy Shindle's 382 in 1892; his total was 99 higher than that of league runner-up Ken Boyer. Santo broke his own record in 1967 with 393 assists, which remained the NL record until Schmidt posted 404 in 1974. He also finished fourth in the 1967 NL Most Valuable Player Award voting results. Santo's assist totals from 1963 through 1968 were the six highest by an NL third baseman between 1905 and 1973. He also led the NL in putouts every year from 1962 through 1967 and again in 1969, tying the league record shared by Pie Traynor and Willie Jones in leading the league seven times; Tim Wallach later tied the mark as well.

Santo was deeply saddened by the loss of teammate Ken Hubbs, the Cubs second baseman, killed in a plane crash just prior to the 1964 season. Santo was interviewed by Tom Harmon, narrator of the film A Glimpse of Greatness–The Story of Ken Hubbs, in which Santo paid the highest respects to the young Hubbs.

In 1969, Santo and the Cubs were in first place in the National League East for 180 days, before going 8–17 in their final 25 games, while the New York "Miracle" Mets went 37–11 in their final 48 games. During that season, the Cubs sent their entire starting infield, including Santo, to the All-Star Game in Washington, D.C.; he and Cubs shortstop Don Kessinger started for the NL team. Santo finished the season with a .289 batting average, 29 home runs and a career-high 123 runs batted in (RBI), and finished fifth in the NL's MVP voting.

==== Heel click ====
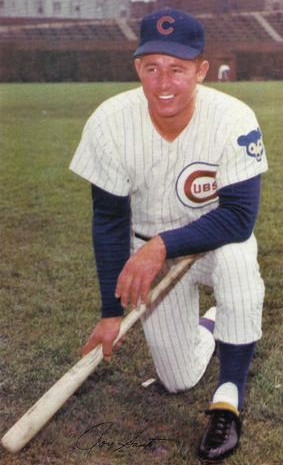
Santo in 1969

During the 1969 season, Santo became known for performing a heel click after a game on June 22, 1969, against the Montreal Expos. Going into the bottom of the ninth inning, the Expos were leading 6–3. With one out, Paul Popovich hit a single and moved up to second base after another single by Billy Williams. Although Santo grounded out for the second out, Popovich and Williams each moved up a base. Then future Hall of Famer Ernie Banks singled to bring home Williams and Popovich and bring the Cubs within a run. Rick Bladt substituted as a pinch runner for Banks. That set it up for Jim Hickman, who hit a two-run walk-off home run to win the game 7–6. When Hickman reached home plate, Santo was so excited that after congratulating him by bear hugging and pounding him on his head, Santo ran down the third base line and jumped three times, clicking his heels on each jump.

The next day, Santo walked into manager Leo Durocher's office; Durocher asked him to keep clicking his heels whenever the Cubs won at Wrigley Field to motivate the team. Santo continued this after every home win. The stunt antagonized opponents and served to make the team a target for payback in the final weeks of the season. When the Cubs began their September swoon, which took place shortly after Santo called out rookie teammate Don Young in public after a loss against the Mets in New York, he discontinued the heel click routine suddenly. His final "click" was performed on September 2, the last Cub home victory while still in first place. During and after the epic collapse, Santo never again performed the heel click, as critics decried the routine for its arrogance and overconfidence, which many believe was at the root of the late fade. On the day Santo was enshrined in the Hall of Fame, the Cubs' starting lineup all did the "kick" at the start of the game in tribute.

==== Trade veto ====
Santo became the first player to invoke the ten-and-five rule under the collective bargaining agreement that was signed to end the 1972 Major League Baseball strike. The rule allowed players with ten years' service, the last five with the same team, to decline any trade. The Cubs had agreed upon a deal to send Santo to the California Angels; the ballclub would have received in return two young pitchers: Andy Hassler, who went on to have a middling career as a reliever/spot starter, and Bruce Heinbechner, a very highly regarded left-handed pitching prospect, who died before the beginning of the 1974 season. Santo's desire to stay in Chicago was his motivation to veto the deal on December 8, 1973.

=== Chicago White Sox (1974) ===
He then asked Cubs management to try for a deal with the crosstown White Sox which was made official on December 11, 1973, with the North Siders acquiring Steve Swisher, Steve Stone and Ken Frailing. Jim Kremmel was also sent to the Cubs to complete the transaction one week later on December 18. The White Sox already had a third baseman, Bill Melton, so Santo was relegated mostly to designated hitter duty, which he hated. He wanted to play in the field, but White Sox manager Chuck Tanner would not bench Melton and unsuccessfully tried Santo at second base. Finishing 1974 with a .221 batting average and 5 home runs, Santo retired from baseball at the age of 34.

== Post-retirement ==
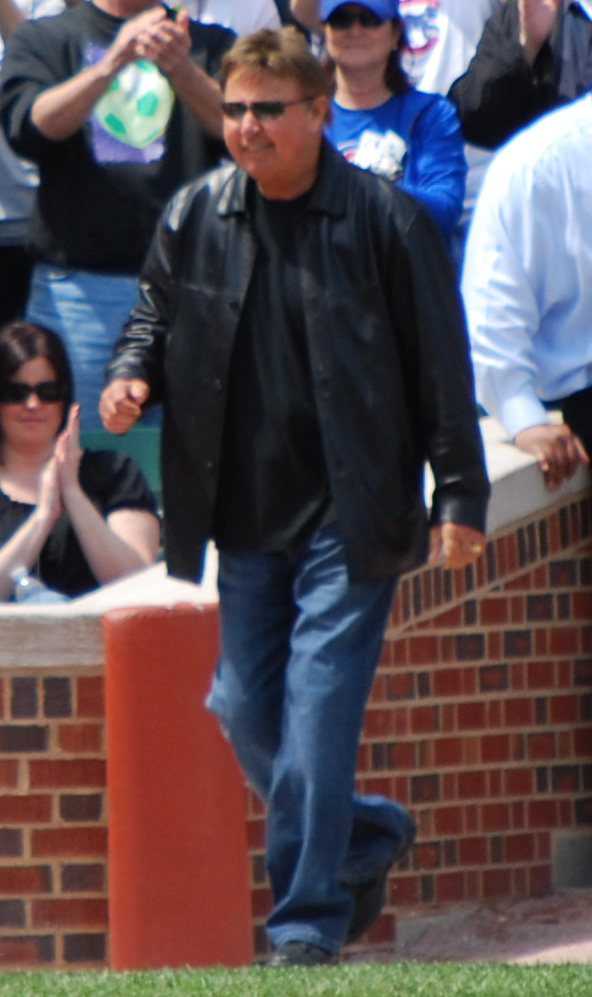
Santo at Wrigley Field in 2009

=== Broadcast career ===
As the "single biggest Cubs fan of all time," Santo joined the Cubs' broadcast booth in 1990 as the WGN radio color commentator. He worked with play-by-play announcer Pat Hughes, and these radio broadcasts were also known as the Pat and Ron Show. He also worked with Harry Caray, Thom Brennaman, Steve Stone and Bob Brenly. Santo also briefly worked with Chicago Bears and Green Bay Packers commentator Wayne Larrivee. In addition to his broadcasting career, he did commercials for Seattle Sutton's Healthy Eating, which he endorsed, along with joining Hughes in ads for Walgreens and Chevrolet. In Chicago, Santo was known for his unabashed broadcast enthusiasm, including groans and cheers during the game. As excitable as Santo was when a great play for the Cubs occurred, he was equally as vocal in his displeasure when events turned against the Cubs.

=== Struggle with diabetes ===
In the early years of his playing career, he carefully concealed the fact that he had type 1 diabetes. He feared that if this information were to be known, he would be forced into retirement. Because the methods of regulating diabetes in the 1960s and 1970s were not as advanced as they are today, Santo gauged his blood sugar levels based on his moods. If he felt his blood sugar was low, he would snack on a candy bar in the clubhouse.

As part of the publicity surrounding "Ron Santo Day" at Wrigley Field on August 28, 1971, he revealed his struggle with diabetes. He was diagnosed with this disease at the age of 18, and was given a life expectancy of 25 years. Santo had both his legs amputated below the knee as a result of his diabetes: the right in 2001 and the left in 2002.

In 2004 Santo and his battle against diabetes were the subject of a documentary, This Old Cub. The film was written, co-produced and directed by Santo's son Jeff.

Santo shared a bond in this respect with 2008 Cubs rookie Sam Fuld, who also has type 1 diabetes.

=== Charities ===
The Santo family has been involved with the Juvenile Diabetes Research Foundation since 1979, with the annual Ron Santo Walk to Cure Diabetes in Chicago having raised over $65 million for the organization. In 2002, Santo was named the Juvenile Diabetes Research Foundation's "Person of the Year." Santo also inspired Bill Holden to walk 2,100 miles (3,400 km) from Arizona to Chicago to raise $250,000 for diabetes research. During the 2016 World Series, the JDRF hosted watch parties for road games hosted by family members.

=== Death ===
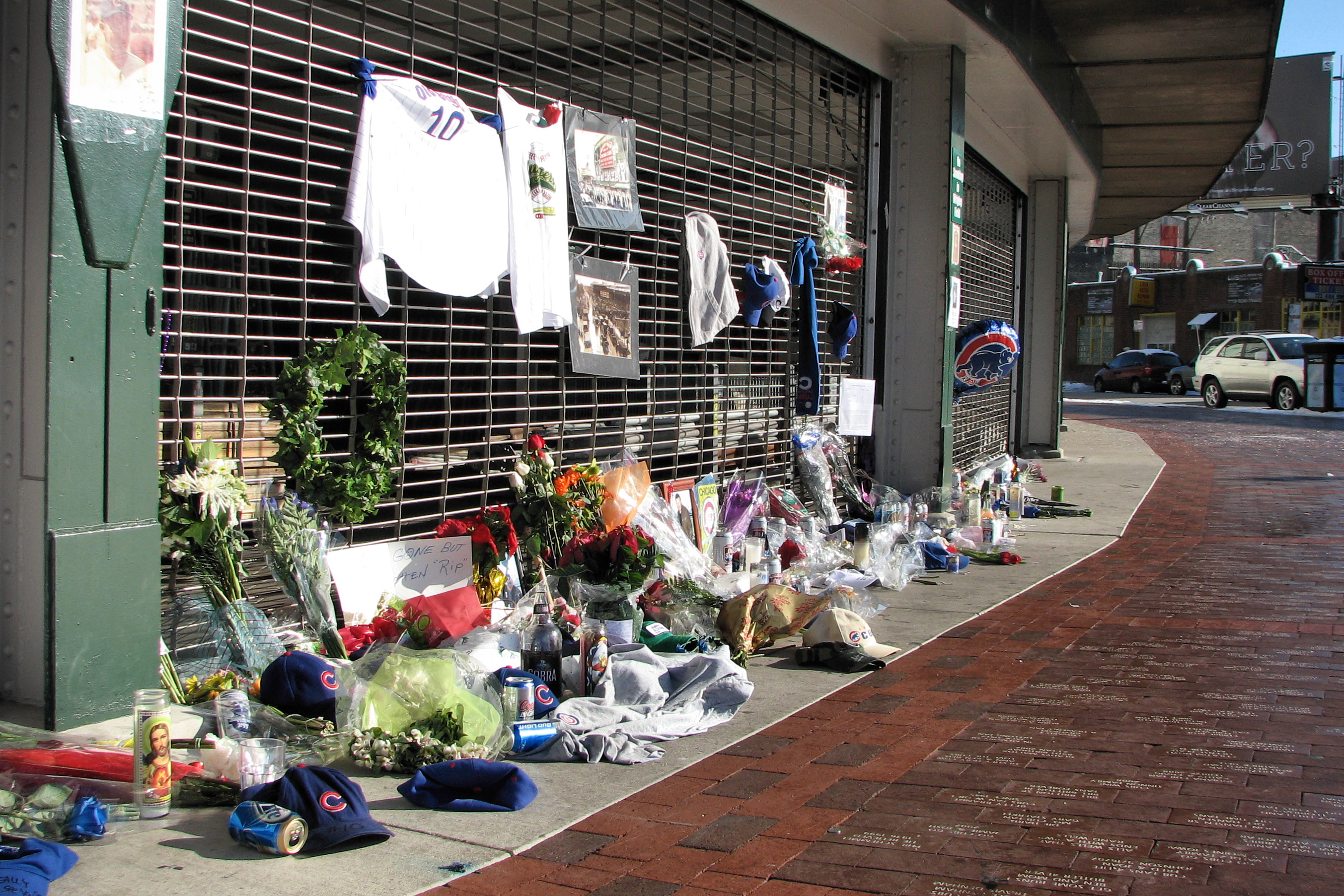
Memorial outside Wrigley Field following Santo's death in 2010

Santo died at 12:40 am on December 3, 2010, at the age of 70 in a hospital in Scottsdale, Arizona, due to complications from bladder cancer and diabetes. (Many media outlets reported the date as "the night of the 2nd" or "overnight.") Santo had lapsed into a coma on December 1. A funeral mass was celebrated at Holy Name Cathedral on December 10, where Santo's casket was carried in by former teammates Ernie Banks, Ferguson Jenkins, Randy Hundley, Glenn Beckert, and Billy Williams, draped with the No. 10 flag that flew over Wrigley the day his number was retired. He was eulogized by his longtime broadcast partner Pat Hughes, along with Cubs owner Tom Ricketts and MLB Commissioner Bud Selig. Following the service, the procession paused outside Tribune Tower, home of WGN Radio, before heading north to circle Wrigley Field, starting at third base. Santo was later cremated and his ashes scattered on the field at the Friendly Confines.

On August 10, 2011, Santo was memorialized and "immortalized" at Wrigley Field with the presentation of a statue in his likeness. The statue is a portrayal of a young Santo playing defense at third base, leaning to his right while throwing a ball. The base of the statue cites his legacy as an announcer, his baseball achievements and his impact on research into juvenile diabetes. The statue today is in Gallagher Way, outside of Wrigley Field's third base grandstand alongside statues of Ryne Sandberg, Ernie Banks, Fergie Jenkins and Billy Williams.

== Hall of Fame candidacy ==
=== BBWAA ===
When Santo first became eligible for election to the Baseball Hall of Fame in 1980, he was named on less than four percent of all ballots cast by the Baseball Writers' Association of America (BBWAA), resulting in his removal from the ballot in subsequent years; he was one of several players re-added to the ballot in 1985 following widespread complaints about overlooked candidates, with the remainder of their 15 years of eligibility restored even if this extended beyond the usual limit of 20 years after their last season. After receiving 13 percent of the vote in the 1985 election, his vote totals increased in 10 of the next 13 years until he received 43 percent of the vote in his final year on the 1998 ballot, finishing third in the voting behind electee Don Sutton and 2000 inductee Tony Pérez.

=== Veterans Committee ===
Following revamped voting procedures for the Veterans Committee, which had elected players retired for over 20 years to the Hall of Fame, Santo finished third in 2003, tied for first in 2005, and again finished first in voting for the 2007 and 2009 inductions, but fell short of the required number of votes each year.

=== Golden Era Committee ===
Santo's next opportunity for admission to the Hall of Fame following a further major change to the voting structure and process announced in 2010, came during the voting in 2011 by the new 16-member Golden Era Committee which considers every three years, ten candidates identified by the Historical Overview Committee from the 1947 to 1972 era.

Although Santo became a widely supported candidate for selection, his initial poor showing in balloting has been attributed to various factors, including a longtime tendency of BBWAA voters to overlook third basemen; at the time Santo retired, only three of the over 120 players elected were third basemen, and only Pie Traynor had been elected by the BBWAA. Also, the fact that Santo's best years occurred in the pitching-dominated 1960s has been cited as a factor that led the voters to perhaps overlook him. Another possible reason that was suggested was that voters had not focused sufficiently on Santo's high walk totals and defense. These aspects of play are perhaps more valued by sabermetrics — newer methods of evaluating a baseball player's productivity — than they have been by BBWAA voters in the past. For example, Santo's career adjusted on-base plus slugging (OPS+; the sum of a player's on-base percentage and slugging percentage, adjusted for the park and league in which he played and expressed as a percentage of the league average) would rank him exactly in the middle of the ten major league third basemen who were in the Hall of Fame in 2011.

One argument that was raised against Santo's Hall of Fame candidacy is that his batting statistics over the course of his career were significantly better at home than on the road. He hit 216 of his 342 home runs at home, and only 126 on the road. His career batting average at home was .296, versus .257 on the road. However, several players elected to the Hall of Fame by the BBWAA, such as Carl Yastrzemski, Wade Boggs, Jim Rice and Kirby Puckett, batted significantly better in their home parks than they did on the road. Hall of Famers with a significant differential between their home numbers and road numbers in terms of home runs include Mel Ott (323 homers at home and 188 on the road), Frank Robinson (321 at home, 265 on the road), Jimmie Foxx (299 at home, 235 on the road) and Hank Greenberg (205 at home, 126 on the road). Others have also commented that two Cubs players who were in their prime during Santo's prime years have already been honored by the Hall of Fame (Ferguson Jenkins and Billy Williams), and the Cubs also featured a third Hall of Famer, Ernie Banks, who was arguably past his prime, yet the team never won a pennant. However, the late 1960s Cubs were far from the only team in baseball history with multiple Hall of Famers that did not win a pennant or a World Series.

Santo also fell short of such traditional standards of Hall election as 3,000 hits and 500 home runs; however, by the time his career ended, only two third basemen (Brooks Robinson and Lave Cross) had even collected 2,500 hits, and only one (Eddie Mathews) had reached the 500-home run plateau. Bill James, a notable statistical guru who has ranked Santo among the 100 greatest players of all time (sixth among third basemen), believed his election to the Hall of Fame was long overdue.

Even though Santo was disappointed at being bypassed by the Hall of Fame, on the day his jersey number 10 was retired by the Cubs, the ever-optimistic and emotional "old Cub" told the cheering Wrigley Field crowd, "This is my Hall of Fame!" During Ryne Sandberg's Hall of Fame acceptance speech in 2005, Sandberg reiterated his support for Santo's selection, saying, "...for what it's worth, Ron Santo just gained one more vote from the Veterans Committee." On April 19, 2007, the Illinois House of Representatives adopted HB 109 (Cross), urging the Veterans Committee of the Baseball Hall of Fame to elect Ron Santo to the Baseball Hall of Fame.

While Santo initially received little support for induction into the Hall of Fame, his standing among baseball enthusiasts and sabermetricians gradually increased over time, culminating with his induction to the Hall of Fame two years after his death.

==== Hall of Fame election ====
On December 5, 2011, the 16-member Golden Era Committee that began voting on ten candidates selected by the BBWAA screening committee, was composed of Hank Aaron, Pat Gillick, Al Kaline, Ralph Kiner, Tommy Lasorda, Juan Marichal, Brooks Robinson, Billy Williams, Paul Beeston, Bill DeWitt, Roland Hemond, Gene Michael, Al Rosen, Dick Kaegel, Jack O'Connell, and Dave Van Dyck. They were charged with determining whether Santo would be elected to the National Baseball Hall of Fame's Class of 2012. Williams, Santo's long-time teammate and friend, had made a fresh case for Santo, emphasizing his personal struggle with diabetes during his career, and his post-retirement charitable work to try to find a cure. Santo received 15 of the 16 possible votes and was the only one of the ten Golden Era Ballot candidates to be elected to the Hall of Fame by the committee's first vote. Santo's widow Vicki accepted the plaque on Induction Day, and spoke about his love of the Cubs and his devotion to people with diabetes.

== MLB statistics ==
Santo's major league stats:

Years	Games	PA	AB	Runs	Hits	2B	3B	HR	RBI	SB	BB	SO	BA	OBP	SLG	OPS	E	Fld%
15	2,243	9,397	8,143	1,138	2,254	365	67	342	1,331	35	1,108	1,343	.277	.362	.464	.826	317	.954

== MLB awards ==
Santo's major league awards:

Award / Honor	Time(s)	Date(s)
National League All-Star	9	1963–1966, 1968–1969, 1971–1973
National League Gold Glove Award (3B)	5	1964– 1968
National League Player of the Month Award	3	June 1963, July 1964, June 1969
Lou Gehrig Memorial Award	1	1973

== Personal life ==
In 1960, Santo married his high school sweetheart Judy Scott. Together, the couple had three children. They divorced in 1982. The following year, he married his second wife Vicki; they remained married until his death. The couple resided in Bannockburn, Illinois.

== Legacy ==
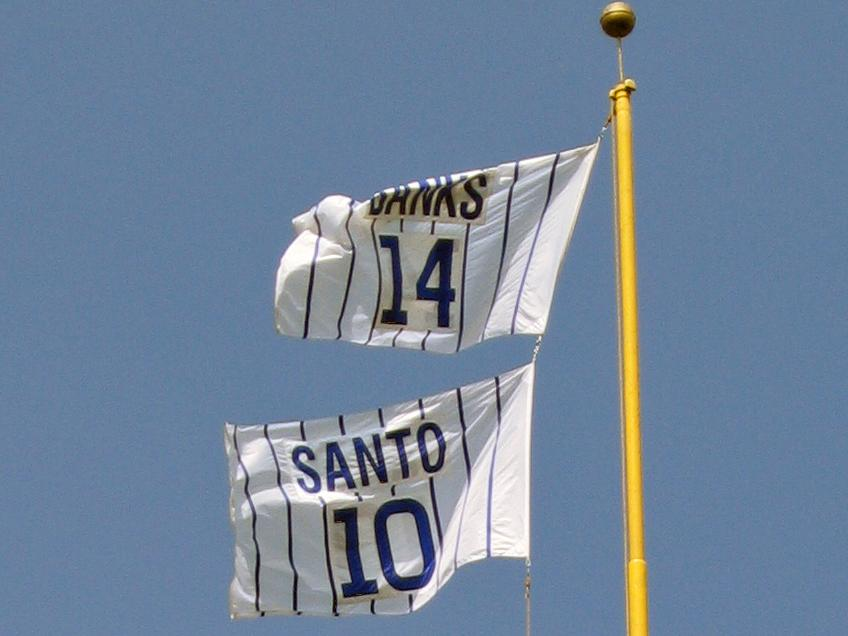
Retired number at Wrigley Field

Santo led the league in double plays six times (1961, 1964, 1966–68, 1971), tying the major league record held by Heinie Groh; Mike Schmidt also later tied this record. He led the National League in total chances every season from 1961 through 1968. He appeared at third base in every Cubs game from April 19, 1964 through May 31, 1966, establishing a league record with 364 consecutive games at the position; his 164 games at third base in 1965 remain the major league record.

He won the NL Player of the Month award three times: June 1963 (.384, 6 HR, 22 RBI); July 1964 (.395, 7 HR, 27 RBI); and June 1969 (.400, 6 HR, 34 RBI).

Santo broke Eddie Mathews' NL record of 369 career double plays at third base in 1972, and in 1973 he broke Mathews' league records of 4,284 assists and 6,606 total chances. Schmidt passed Santo's record for double plays in 1986, his record for assists in 1987, and his mark for total chances in 1988. During his 14-season run with the Cubs, Santo hit 337 home runs, then the eighth most by a NL right-handed hitter; his 1,071 career walks with the Cubs remain the team record for a right-handed hitter. He was the first third baseman to hit 300 home runs and win five Gold Gloves, a feat since matched only by Schmidt and Scott Rolen.

Santo became the first player in major league history to wear a batting helmet with protective ear flaps, when in 1966, in the midst of trying to break the Cubs' modern consecutive-game hitting streak record of 27 games (set by Hack Wilson in 1929), Santo was sidelined for nearly two weeks following a pitch thrown by the Mets' Jack Fisher. The beaning fractured his cheekbone and ended his consecutive playing streak. When he returned (and broke the hitting record with a 28-game streak) he was wearing an improvised ear flap on his batting helmet in order to protect the injury; ear flaps have since become standard equipment on batting helmets.

In 1999, he was named to the Cubs All-Century Team.

Ron Santo's number 10 was retired by the Chicago Cubs in 2003.

On September 28, 2003, Santo's jersey No. 10 was retired by the Cubs organization, making him the third player so honored behind his teammates Ernie Banks (#14) and Billy Williams (#26). Other prominent Cubs had worn No. 10 after Santo's retirement, notably Dave Kingman and Leon Durham; the most recent wearer had been interim manager Bruce Kimm, just the previous year. In April 2004, Santo was inducted into the inaugural class of the Washington Interscholastic Activities Association (Washington's high school athletics league) Hall of Fame as a graduate of Seattle's Franklin High School. About a month after Santo's death, Cubs Chairman Tom Ricketts announced that Santo would be honored by the Cubs in the 2011 season. From spring training through the end of the season, the Cubs wore a patch on the sleeve of their jersey with the number 10 on it.

Shortly after his death in 2010, Bleacher Report released a ranking of the 50 most beloved announcers in baseball history, in which Santo was placed 16th. On his entry, Sam Westmoreland wrote about Santo that "he made his share of errors, but that just made him all the more lovable and beloved. He passed as an icon, and deserves a spot in the Baseball Hall of Fame."

== See also ==
- List of Major League Baseball retired numbers
- List of Major League Baseball career home run leaders
- List of Major League Baseball career hits leaders
- List of Major League Baseball career runs scored leaders
- List of Major League Baseball career runs batted in leaders
- List of Major League Baseball annual triples leaders
- List of Gold Glove Award winners at third base

Awards and achievements
Preceded by Jim Baxes	Topps Rookie All-Star Third Baseman; 1960	Succeeded by Charley Smith
Preceded by Dick Ellsworth; Jim Bunning; Ken Holtzman	Major League Player of the Month; June 1963; July 1964; June 1969	Succeeded by Willie McCovey; Frank Robinson; Roberto Clemente
