= Keith Vincent Anderson =

Australian aviator (1898-1929)

Keith Anderson
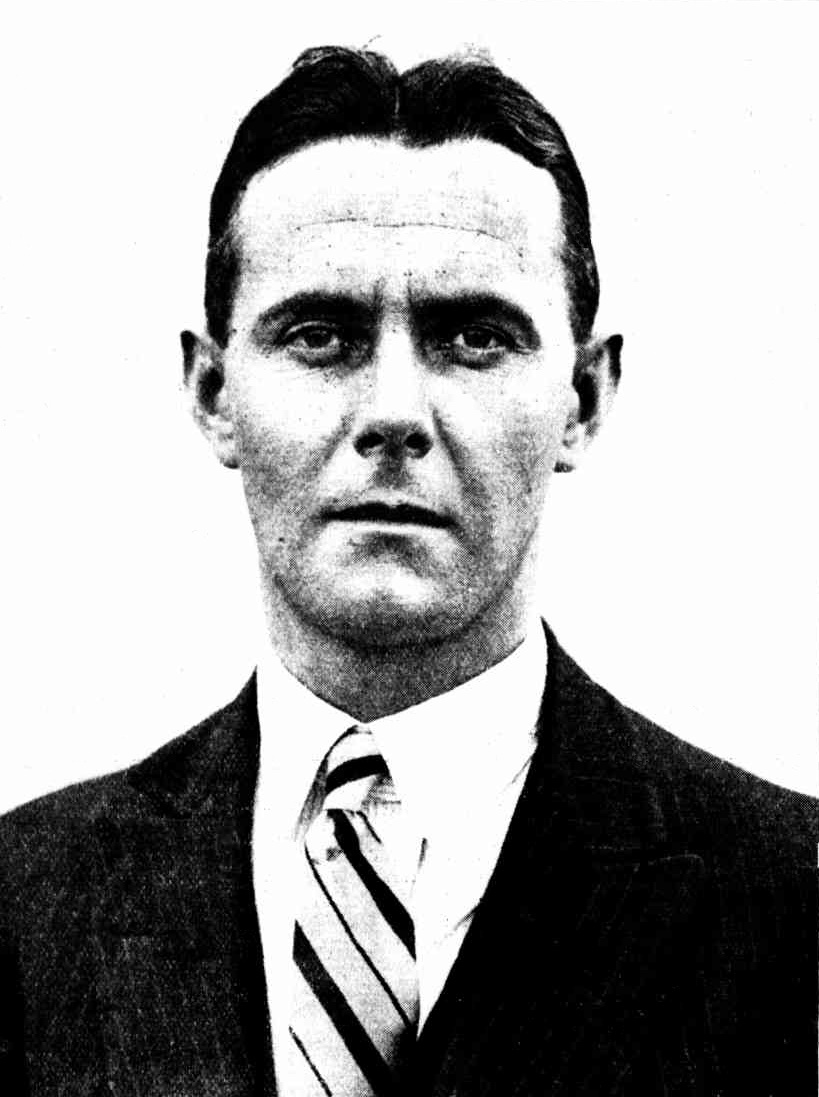
- Portrait of Keith Anderson
- Born: Keith Vincent Anderson; July 6, 1898; Perth, Western Australia
- Died: April 1929, aged 30

Keith Vincent Anderson (6 July 1898 – April 1929) was an Australian pioneer aviator. In 1927 Anderson and his co-pilot, "Bobby" Hitchcock, undertook a round-Australia flight. Anderson and Hitchcock died in 1929, after a forced landing in the desert, during the search for Charles Kingsford Smith and his crew, who had been forced to land in Western Australia on the first leg of a flight in the Southern Cross aircraft to London.

== Early life ==
Anderson was born in Perth, Western Australia, son of Sidney Jerrold Anderson and his wife Constance (née Willdridge), both originally from Victoria. He received most of his education in South Africa, having been sent there to a live with relative of his mother while his father was working in Ceylon, now Sri Lanka.

== Career ==
Anderson had completed his studies at South African College and at age 18 was selected by Major Alastair Miller as a recruit for the Royal Flying Corps, and learned to fly there and in England, joining the 73rd Squadron in September 1917, and served in France with some distinction, being credited with downing five enemy aircraft confirmed. He was discharged and returned to South Africa with shellshock and a total of 900 flying hours logged in nine models of aircraft, among them the Maurice Farman, Avro 504, Sopwith Pup and Camel, De Havilland DH6, DH9 and DH9A and the B.E.2.

He returned to Australia in 1921, living in Perth, where his mother lived, his father having died some years earlier. He joined Western Australian Airways Ltd. in 1922, and for two years flew their North-west air mail route. Squadron-Leader Charles Kingsford Smith was already flying for "Airways", and they became friends. Anderson left the company in March 1924, and in January, 1927, purchased from them a Bristol Tourer, in which he made an attempt on the record of Perth to Sydney by air in 21½ hours established by Lieut. F. S. Briggs in 1920 in a DH.4. Kingsford Smith, also in a Bristol Tourer, attempted the record at the same time; both completing the 2,200 miles (3,500 km) in 30 flying hours, attributing their lack of success to a strong headwind.

In Sydney Anderson met Lyal "Bon" Hilliard (born 19 October 1896) of Collaroy, New South Wales, aviation enthusiast and socialite, an early member of Junior Red Cross, and on their behalf had made and raffled in 1926 a large Alan Cobham doll, which was eventually given to Cobham. They announced their engagement in April 1927. (Note: Lyal "Bon" Hilliard would later marry Captain Thomas Marshall Tate.)

In 1927, Anderson undertook a round-Australia trip for George A. Bond & Co., manufacturers of underwear and hosiery, at a cost of £12,500, to assess the commercial usefulness of aviation to the company. Travelling with him were Henry Smith "Bobby" Hitchcock, (Note: Hitchcock's nickname of "Bobbie" or "Bobby" led to a great number of references to him as "R. Hitchcock" or "R. S. Hitchcock".) previously mechanic for "Airways", and C. C. Vivian, Bond's advertising manager. The plane left Sydney on 25 June and returned 8 July, a total of 14 days.

Kingsford Smith also resigned from Western Australian Airways and, sponsored by The Herald and Weekly Times (Melbourne), The Sun (Sydney), and the Daily Mail (Brisbane), made a record-breaking round-Australia flight with a co-pilot, Charles P. Ulm, in a similar aircraft, which left Sydney on 18 June and returned on 29 June, a few hours over 9 days for a little over 7,000 miles (11,000 km).

Kingsford Smith's next challenge was the Trans-Pacific flight, and Anderson was brought in as one of the three-man team. He visited Hawaii in September 1927 to assess the airfields available on the islands then went to America with Kingsford Smith and Ulm to help in its organisation, but returned to Australia in March before the plane Southern Cross had been procured. The flight was originally planned for November 1927, but there was considerable agitation in New South Wales to force its cancellation. NSW Premier Jack Lang promised £4000 support, but the succeeding Bavin ministry repudiated the undertaking. To raise funds for the trans-Pacific flight, Kingsford Smith and Poole, an American pilot, in Southern Cross made an attempt on the world record for sustained flight. They were unsuccessful, but secured a wealthy backer in George Allan Hancock, an American millionaire, who cleared their debts and so enabled the flight to go ahead.

In August 1927 they purchased the three-engine Fokker (once owned by Hubert Wilkins) for £7,500, originally priced at £15,000.
Because of Anderson's failure to return, the personnel for the flight was finalised at: Kingsford Smith (pilot), C. T. P. Ulm (organising manager and relief pilot), and Americans Harry W. Lyon (navigator) and James Warner (radio operator). Lyon and Warner were to travel only to Suva, after which Kingsford Smith would be solo pilot and Ulm navigator.
Kingsford Smith and his four-man crew left Oakland, California on 31 May 1928 and landed in Brisbane on the morning of 9 June 1928, having flown around 7,250 miles (11,670 km) via Hawaii and Fiji.

=== Lawsuits ===
Following Anderson's return to Australia, which he claimed was in furtherance of the team's objectives, but whose nature was never revealed, he was dropped from Kingsford Smith's team, and the flight from San Francisco to Australia was made without him. Anderson felt aggrieved, as he had put considerable time, effort and expense into the project, and wanted some share of the financial rewards. Brisbane Truth agreed: "It is regrettable that Anderson wasn't with them, but no doubt Kingsford Smith, in his tour of triumph, will not forget his mate." His fiancée's father, Sydney solicitor A. V. Hilliard (1865–1933), arranged a restraining order preventing Kingsford Smith and Ulm from moving Southern Cross from the jurisdiction of the New South Wales courts until a settlement had been reached.

Attached to Anderson's affidavit was a letter written to him in May 1928 by Kingsford Smith and Ulm, accepting that Anderson wanted to be part of the flight, but were unable to help with cost of the fare, and further "We hear that you have made little or no effort to do anything for us since your return to Australia, while on the other hand you left us here to carry the baby. At the time of your leaving, it looked a most hopeless baby to carry."

On 22 February 1929, Anderson dropped his claims against Kingsford Smith, accepting the argument that by leaving America of his own free will he had forfeited membership in the partnership, and Kingsford Smith withdrew any intimations that Anderson's departure was from cowardice or lack of confidence in the project. This meant that the Southern Cross was free of legal restraints and the London flight could go ahead.

Then on 19 March 1929 at the Returned Servicemen's Ball, a writ was served on behalf of Hitchcock, on Kingsford Smith, Ulm and Anderson for £1000, claiming they had promised him a part in the Southern Cross Pacific crossing. Kingsford Smith admitted having made certain promises to Hitchcock, but never admitted him into the flying team. The Supreme Court judge accepted Kingsford Smith's argument that the original project had been abandoned, and no promise had been made in respect of the revised flight, and directed the jury to find for the defendants.

Anderson and Hitchcock next announced an attempt on Bert Hinkler's record flight to London in the Bristol Tourer, which by this time had done well over 1300 flying hours. They left Sydney on 6 September 1928, but got no further than Pine Creek, Northern Territory, when they had radiator trouble and made a forced landing, from which Anderson emerged unscathed, and Hitchcock suffering nothing worse than a badly cut lip and a strained shoulder, but the plane was a write-off, with nothing salvageable except the engine.

=== Two searches ===
After a series of well-publicised delays, Kingsford Smith, Ulm, Harold A. Litchfield (navigator) and Thomas Harrison "Tom" McWilliams (wireless operator) took off in "The Old Bus" (Southern Cross) from Richmond airfield for Wyndham, Western Australia on 30 March 1929 on the first leg of their London flight. They had 800 gallons of fuel on board, but lost their way in a rain storm, ran low on fuel and around midday 31 March radioed that they were putting down some 150 miles (240 km) short of their objective, on an area dubbed "Coffee Royal" by the aviators.

By 3 April four or five planes had been deployed in the search for the missing airmen, two chartered from West Australian Airways by The Sun newspaper, one flown by Jim Woods and the other by Eric Chater (who had to make a forced landing near Walcott Inlet). These planes only had a cruising range of four hours, and found no trace.

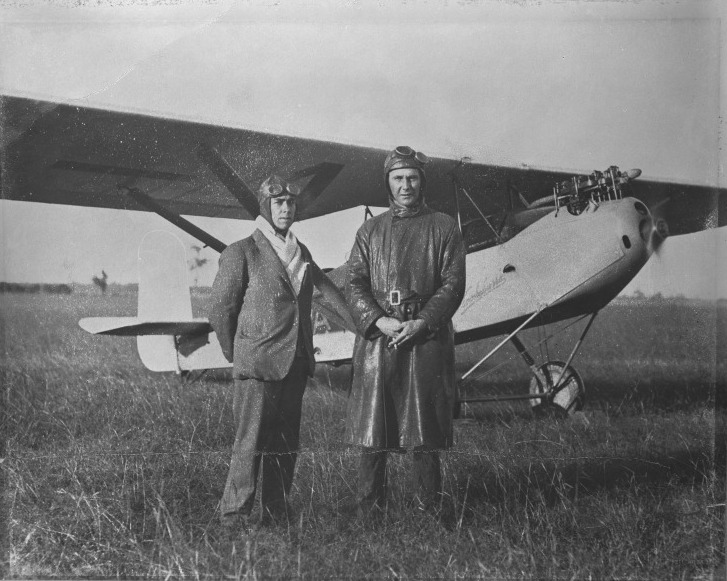
Anderson and Hitchcock standing in front of the aircraft Kookaburra

Anderson resolved to join the search in the Westland Widgeon III monoplane Kookaburra, which he had purchased a month earlier. Financial assistance for his search attempt was promised by John Cantor, of the Customs House Hotel.

On 7 April, Anderson and Hitchcock took off from Richmond airstrip. The plane took off easily with its load of 880 pounds (400 kg), Anderson having told fellow-pilot Milton Kent that he had the right machine for the job, and would leave no stone unturned in his search for the missing men. They had intended to reach the search area in four "hops": Broken Hill, Oodnadatta, Alice Springs and Wyndham, but their last contact was at "The Alice" on Wednesday morning 10 April 1929, when they left with their only provisions some sandwiches and two bottles of water."

Les Holden, in his DH.61 Canberra, found Southern Cross on 12 April, threw some provisions to the crew, and passed her location to Fred Heath of West Australian Airways, who landed alongside.

Lester Joseph Brain of Qantas in Atlanta found Kookaburra and one body on 21 April. Anderson's body was found some small distance away on 29 April by a (mounted) ground party led by Lieut. Charles Eaton. They also found a diary whose last entry was 12 April. Eaton and his men Moran and Douglas buried the bodies, which were recovered by a six-wheeled Thornycroft motor truck in June.

Hitchcock's funeral was held in Perth and his remains buried at Karrakatta on 3 July 1929.

Anderson was accorded a full military funeral at Mosman, New South Wales on 6 July 1929. and was buried at St George's Heights, a site uniquely granted by the Council of the Municipality of Mosman.

=== Conspiracy? ===
A British magazine Aeroplane published an allegation that Anderson and Kingsford Smith had contrived the Southern Cross disappearance as a "stunt" or to give Anderson heroic status. "Support" for these contentions was the disappearance of the Southern Cross 's stash of food rations, and the financial assistance Kingsford Smith gave Anderson to buy the plane Kookaburra. He had also dropped at the Drysdale Mission misleading information as to his intended course. Willian Angus Todd, for a time their navigator, attested that back in the days of financial stringency, he had heard Ulm suggest that if they should get lost in the Australian outback, they would have no lack of public support. Dudley Walsh, of the Neptune Oil Company had heard a similar proposal from Ulm. Jim Woods, one of the searching pilots, swore his searches had taken him close to "Coffee Royal", and would have investigated smoke if anyone had wanted to draw his attention.

At a Commonwealth enquiry, Kingsford Smith vehemently denied any collusion or staging the event to gain attention, and the board of enquiry agreed.

== Recognition ==
Abe Shannon was prominent in calling for a memorial to Anderson and Hitchcock. Such a memorial was unveiled at Rawson Park, Mosman on 27 July 1930. Anderson remains the only white man buried in Mosman.

In her will, Constance Anderson left to the Perth Museum her son's last diary and other relics, which they already had on loan.
