= Les Holden =

Australian flying ace (1895–1932)

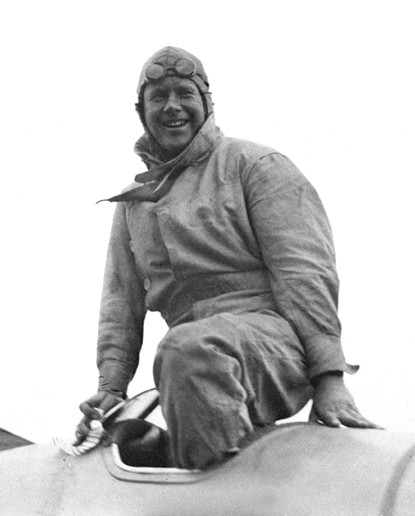
- Les Holden at Sydney's Mascot Aerodrome, after locating the missing Southern Cross in north-western Australia, 1929
- Born: 6 March 1895; East Adelaide, South Australia
- Died: 18 September 1932 (aged 37); Byron Bay, New South Wales
- Military career
- Allegiance: Australia
- Branch: Australian Imperial Force; Australian Flying Corps; Citizen Air Force
- Service years: 1915–19
- Rank: Captain
- Nicknames: "Lucky Les"; "the homing pigeon"
- Units: Australian Light Horse (1915–16); No. 2 Squadron AFC (1917–18); No. 6 Squadron AFC (1918–19)
- Conflicts: World War I; Middle East theatre; Western Front; Battle of Cambrai; German spring offensive
- Awards: Military Cross; Air Force Cross
- Other work: Office manager; commercial pilot

Leslie Hubert Holden, MC, AFC (6 March 1895 – 18 September 1932) was an Australian fighter ace of World War I and later a commercial aviator. A South Australian, he joined the Light Horse in May 1915, serving in Egypt and France. In December 1916, he volunteered for the Australian Flying Corps and qualified as a pilot. As a member of No. 2 Squadron on the Western Front, he gained the sobriquets "Lucky Les" and "the homing pigeon" after a series of incidents that saw him limping back to base in bullet-riddled aircraft. He was awarded the Military Cross, and went on to achieve five aerial victories flying Airco DH.5s and Royal Aircraft Factory S.E.5s.

Promoted to captain, Holden finished the war as an instructor with No. 6 (Training) Squadron in England, where his work earned him the Air Force Cross. After leaving the Australian Flying Corps in 1919, he became a manager at the family firm of Holden's Motor Body Builders and joined the part-time Citizen Air Force, before setting up as a commercial pilot and establishing his own air service. In 1929, he located Charles Kingsford Smith and Charles Ulm in the north-west Australian desert after the pair were reported missing on a flight to England in the Southern Cross. Holden began transport operations in New Guinea in 1931. He was killed the following year in a passenger plane crash in Australia.

== Family and early life ==
Leslie Hubert Holden was born on 6 March 1895 in East Adelaide, South Australia, to travelling businessman Hubert William Holden and his wife Annie Maria. Les was the nephew of H. J. Holden, who later founded the Adelaide-based firm Holden's Motor Body Builders with his son Edward. Hubert Holden landed a partnership with Nestlé in 1905, and the family moved to Turramurra, New South Wales. Les completed his education at Sydney Church of England Grammar School, and joined Nestlé in 1911 as a salesman. By the time Australia entered World War I in August 1914, he was an assistant manager.

== World War I ==
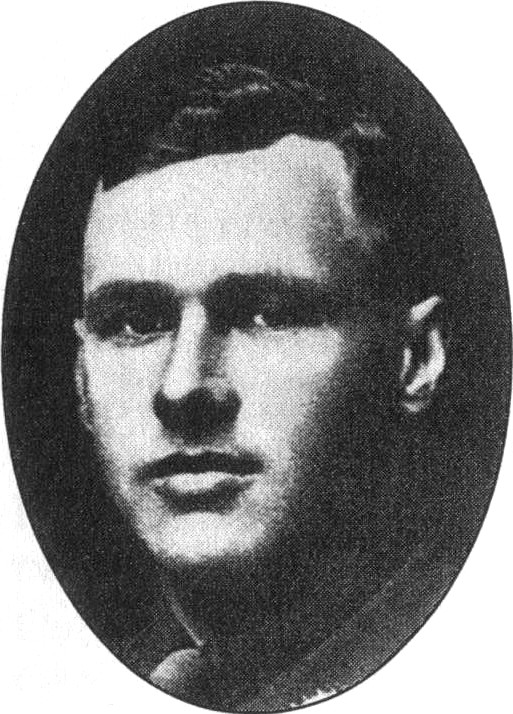
Les Holden, c. 1915–18

Holden enlisted in the Australian Imperial Force on 26 May 1915, and was posted to the 4th Light Horse Brigade as a private. He departed for Egypt aboard the transport HMAT A29 Suevic on 13 June. Serving as a driver first in the Middle East and then on the Western Front, his mechanical ability and sense of adventure led him to volunteer for the Australian Flying Corps (AFC) in December 1916. After qualifying as a pilot in England, he was commissioned a lieutenant and posted to No. 2 Squadron. Commanded by Major Oswald Watt, No. 2 Squadron's personnel included many former Lighthorsemen, as well as mechanics from the AFC's first combat formation, the Mesopotamian Half Flight. The force trained extensively in England commencing in January 1917, before deploying to the Western Front that September. Holden was involved in the AFC's first day of combat in France; just after noon on 2 October, in the vicinity of Saint-Quentin, he and his wingman engaged a German two-seater that managed to escape.

Because its Airco DH.5s were handicapped when used as fighters by engine problems and low speed, No. 2 Squadron was employed mainly in ground support duties. During the fog-shrouded opening day of the Battle of Cambrai on 20 November, Holden bombed and machine-gunned a German communications trench from altitudes as low as 20 or 30 feet (6 or 9 metres). He returned to a forward airfield near Havrincourt Wood with his plane "a flying wreck", in the words of the official history of Australia in the war: "Every part of it was shot full of holes, including petrol-tank, tail-plane, both longerons, and part of the undercarriage, while the elevator control was shot clean away." Two days later he repeated the exercise with similar consequences for his aircraft—"clear evidence of the dangers of the work and of his own good luck", as the official history put it. These two close calls gained him the nicknames "Lucky Les" and "the homing pigeon". He was recommended for the Military Cross on 3 December for his actions of 20 November. The award was promulgated in the London Gazette on 4 February 1918, and the citation appeared on 5 July:

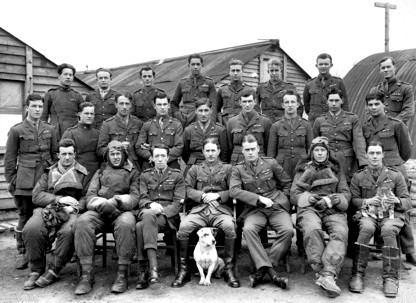
Captains Holden (front, second from left) and Roy Phillipps (front, third from right) with officers of No. 2 Squadron and their four-legged mascots, March 1918

Lt. Leslie Hubert Holden, F.C. For conspicuous gallantry and devotion to duty. Whilst on a special mission he dropped a bomb direct on a support trench full of the enemy, causing them to scatter, and another bomb upon a strong point which was holding up our advance. He also bombed a large group of enemy infantry, and turned his machine gun on them from a height of 100 feet. He rendered very valuable service throughout the operations.

Holden claimed his first aerial victory while No. 2 Squadron was still flying DH.5s, before it began converting to Royal Aircraft Factory S.E.5s in December 1917. On 18 February 1918, he shared in one of the unit's first two victories in the S.E.5, helping send an Albatros down in a spin. He claimed another three aircraft shot down over the following month, giving him a total of five victories. At least one of these took place during the German spring offensive, on 22 March, when all available Allied aircraft were thrown into battle to stem the German advance.

Royal Air Force policy required pilots to be rotated to home establishment for rest and instructional duties after nine to twelve months in combat. Promoted to captain in March 1918, Holden was posted to England in May as a flying instructor with No. 6 (Training) Squadron at Minchinhampton. His unit was part of the 1st Training Wing, led by Lieutenant Colonel Watt, the former commanding officer of No. 2 Squadron. Holden briefly took command of No. 6 Squadron from 25 July to 11 August. He was awarded the Air Force Cross, promulgated on 3 June 1919, for his skill as an instructor.

== Post-war career and legacy ==
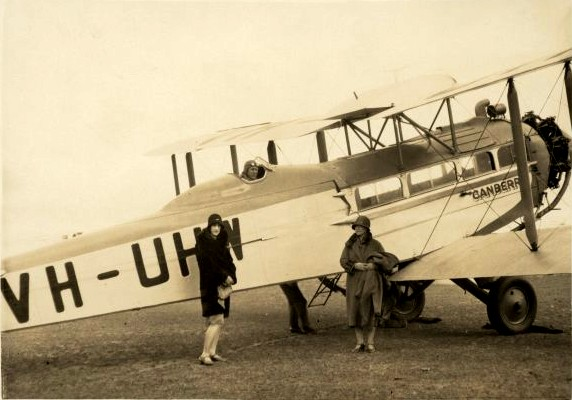
Holden in the cockpit of Canberra, his DH.61 Giant Moth, with passengers at Mascot Aerodrome, c. 1930

No. 6 Squadron was disbanded in March 1919. Along with many other AFC personnel, including Colonel Watt, Major Roy King, and Captain Garnet Malley, Holden departed for Australia on 6 May aboard the troopship Kaisar-I-Hind, disembarking in Sydney on 19 June. He was discharged from the AFC on 18 August 1919. After taking part in the Commonwealth Government's Peace Loan flights, he joined Holden's Motor Body Builders as its Sydney manager. In May 1921, he served with Malley and other veteran pilots as a pall-bearer at Watt's funeral in Randwick. Holden married Kathleen Packman at St Mark's Anglican Church in Darling Point on 3 June 1924; the couple had three daughters.

On 19 June 1925, the Royal Australian Air Force (RAAF) established the Citizen Air Force as a part-time active reserve, and Holden became one of its first recruits. Ranked flight lieutenant, he served as a pilot with No. 3 Squadron, which operated Airco DH.9s and S.E.5s. Formed at RAAF Point Cook, Victoria, it transferred to the newly opened RAAF Richmond, New South Wales, during 29–30 June; Holden and Malley touched down at Richmond with the first two S.E.5s on the 30th. Still hankering after a full-time career in flying, Holden enlisted the help of friends to purchase a de Havilland DH.61 Giant Moth in 1928. He named it Canberra, and used it to start a charter operation out of Mascot Aerodrome in Sydney.

Holden became a national celebrity in April 1929 when he joined an aerial search of the north-western Australian wilderness and located Charles Kingsford Smith and Charles Ulm, after the pair had gone missing on a flight from Sydney to England in the Southern Cross. Two other searchers, Keith Anderson and Bob Hitchcock, were lost in their aircraft, Kookaburra. The media of the day later turned on Smith and Ulm, accusing them of a publicity stunt, and the Sydney Citizens' Relief Committee, which had commissioned the rescue operation, withheld payment of Holden's expenses. He continued flying commercially, and is credited with making, in September 1931, possibly the first flight from Sydney to New Guinea, where he started an air freight service. Returning to Sydney the following year, he established Holden's Air Transport. He also acquired two more aircraft for his New Guinea operations, a Waco and a Moth, to supplement Canberra.

To think that Holden, who had never had a mishap when flying over these dangerous mountains, should be killed when on holiday in Australia, flying to a fishing expedition. It seemed sad to me that I should be taking hospitality in his house, a house like an eagle's eyrie, with a lookout all round such as a flying man would wish for—and his boy continuing to chant his epitaph, "He was a good masta."

— Sarah Chinnery on staying at Holden's house in Salamaua, New Guinea, in February 1933.

On 18 September 1932, Holden was travelling as a passenger aboard a New England Airways DH.80 Puss Moth from Sydney to Brisbane when it crashed at Byron Bay in northern New South Wales, killing him instantly. The other occupants, pilot Ralph Virtue and the joint owner of the Canberra, Holden's schoolfriend George Hamilton, also died. Investigations determined that the Puss Moth, VH-UPM, had gone down as a result of wing failure caused by aileron flutter. A crowded memorial service for Holden and Hamilton took place at Sydney Church of England Grammar School on 20 September; they were cremated that afternoon at Rookwood Cemetery, where eighteen aircraft piloted by friends and associates of the pair overflew the chapel.

Holden, George Hamilton, and one of their schoolmates who had also recently died, Henry Braddon, were commemorated with a memorial stained-glass window at the Sydney Church of England Grammar School chapel in 1934. Holden was also honoured by Holden Street, built in the Sydney suburb of Maroubra in 1943. His father Hubert carried on operating Holden's Air Transport, floating it as a public corporation and serving as chairman.
