= James Holden =

James Holden may refer to:

== Engineers ==
- James Holden (mechanical engineer) (fl. 1802), British mechanical engineer, see William Cockerill
- James Holden (locomotive engineer) (1837–1925), British locomotive engineer

== Others ==
- James Holden (actor) (1920–2005), American actor
- James Holden (footballer) (born 2001), an English professional football goalkeeper
- James Holden (producer) (born 1979), electronic music artist and producer
- James Bismark Holden (1876–1956), politician from Alberta, Canada
- James Stuart Holden (1914–1996), U.S. federal judge
- James Alexander Holden (1835–1887), businessman in South Australia
- James Holden, character in the novel series The Expanse and its television adaptation
- James T. Holden (born 1905), 800 m runner-up at the 1925 USA Outdoor Track and Field Championships
