= Jack Holden =

Jack Holden may refer to:

== People ==
- Jack Holden (actor), English actor
- Jack Holden (athlete) (1907–2004), English long-distance runner
- Jack Holden (footballer) (1910–1976), Australian rules footballer
- Jack Holden (politician) (1921–2002), Australian politician
- John C. "Jack" Holden (born 1934), American geologist

== Fictional characters ==
- Jack Holden (Home and Away), fictional character from the Australian soap opera Home and Away
- Jack Holden (Three Men and a Baby)

== See also ==
- John Holden (disambiguation)
- Holden (surname)
