= This Old Cub =

- Directed by: Jeff Santo
- Written by: Jeff Santo
- Produced by: Joe Mantegna; Jeff Santo; Walgreens; Chicago Tribune
- Starring: Ron Santo; Bill Murray; Joe Mantegna; Gary Sinise
- Distributed by: Big Joe Productions; JDRF; Sony Pictures Home Entertainment (DVD)
- Release date: August 25, 2004
- Running time: 122 minutes
- Country: United States
- Language: English

This Old Cub is a 2004 documentary film. The film is centered on former Chicago Cubs third baseman Ron Santo and both his playing days and his battle against diabetes. The film was written, co-produced, and directed by Santo's son Jeff. It is often mentioned during Cub game broadcasts by Pat Hughes, who was Santo's partner in the WGN Radio booth. The film was a gift from Jeff to his father as a part of the "Ron Santo Day" celebration that season after Santo had both his legs amputated and had just missed induction into the MLB Hall of Fame a few months earlier. A portion of all proceeds from the release of This Old Cub are donated to the Juvenile Diabetes Research Foundation. The film has raised over a half-million dollars for the JDRF. Cub first baseman Ernie Banks, Gary Sinise, Bill Murray, former Chicago Bears linebacker Doug Buffone, and many others are interviewed in the film, which is narrated by actor Joe Mantegna.

The documentary inspired an Arizona teacher and lifelong Cub fan named Bill Holden to engage a 2100-mile walk from Arizona to Wrigley Field to raise funds for the JDRF. Holden covered at least 12 miles each day, crossed six states, and battled his arthritis during the nearly seven-month trek. Followed by the media, Holden arrived at Wrigley on July 1, 2005 where he threw out the first pitch and joined Santo in singing "Take Me Out to the Ball Game". The venture raised over $250,000 for the charity, and caused a dramatic spike in sales of the DVD. Derek Schaul, the leader of Chicago Cubs Bleacher Bums, wears a shirt to every game stating, "I walk for the cure because Ronnie can't! Go Cubbies!"

This Old Cub was co-produced by Walgreens Drug Stores and the Chicago Tribune, both heavy sponsors of the JDRF.

== Reception ==
The Los Angeles Times called the film a "terrific character sketch" although sometimes sentimental.

On review aggregator website Rotten Tomatoes, the film holds an approval rating of 74% based on 19 reviews, with an average rating of 6.9/10.

== See also ==
- List of baseball films
- List of films featuring diabetes
