= H. A. Frost =

Australian saddler and businessman

Henry Adolph Frost (26 June 1844 – 21 July 1909) was an Australian saddler and businessman known for his association with the company which eventually produced the Holden automobile. His name may have been originally Heinrich Friedrich Adolphe Frost, but he evidently preferred "Adolph Frost".

== History ==
Adolph was born in Hamburg, Germany the only son of Johann Joachim Domenicus (John) Frost (31 March 1813 – 14 December 1865) and his wife Catharina Maria Louisa Juncken (March 1821 – 11 February 1905) and two sisters, who emigrated to South Australia on the barque Steinwaerder (Steinwärder) on the 30 August 1848 from Hamburg, arriving on 12 January 1849 at Port Adelaide, South Australia.

They settled at Lyndoch, and on completion of his schooling learned the skills of the saddler, after which he followed his trade at Rhynie, then around 1869 to Port Wakefield then Yorketown, where he ran a lucrative business, and for a time served as mayor.

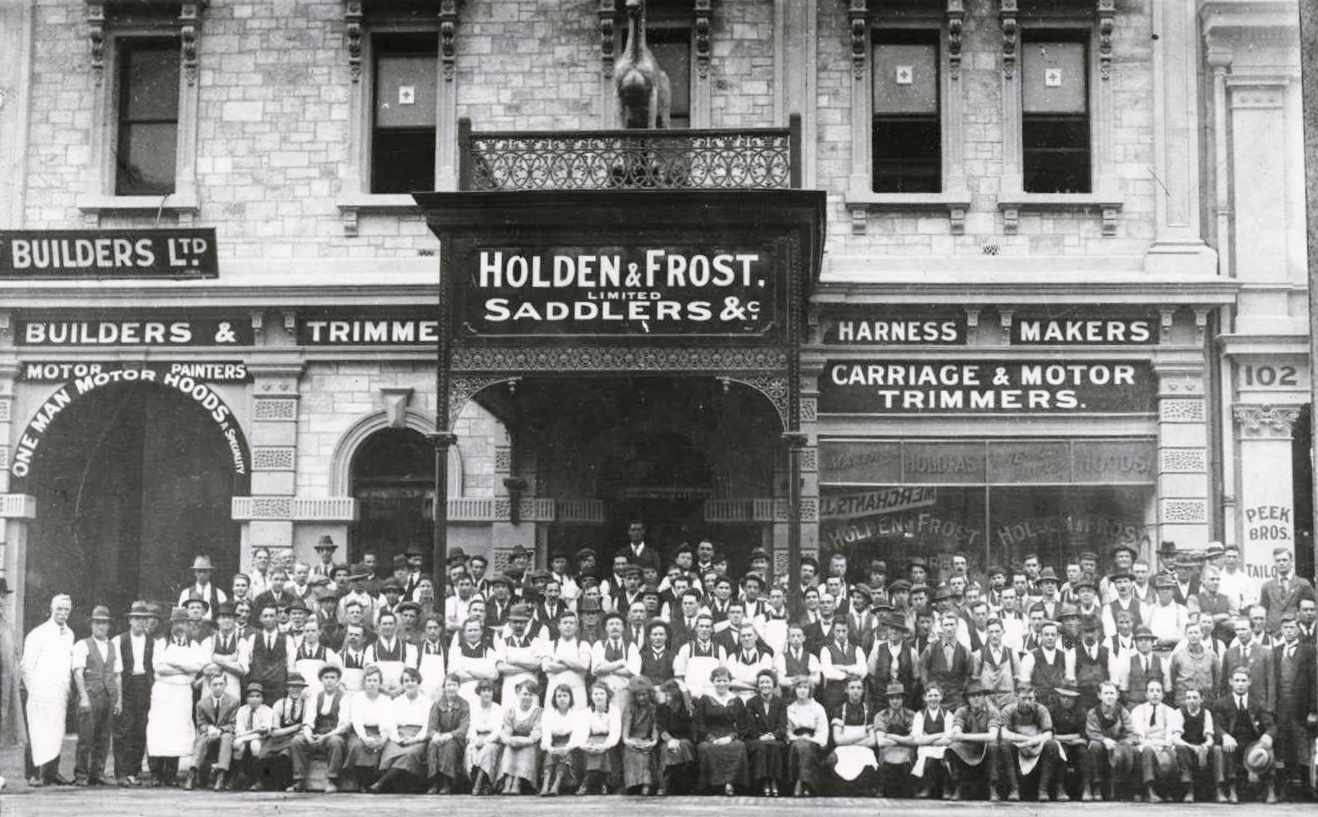
Holden & Frost, 100 Grenfell Street c. 1915

Around 1879 he moved to Adelaide to take a position with J. A. Holden, who on 1 May 1884 took him on as partner in J. A. Holden & Co., which was in a precarious position financially. In August 1885 J. A. Holden sold to his son H. J. Holden and H. A. Frost his interest in the retail arm of the company, which in November 1885 became Holden & Frost. He sold the wholesale business and his Kensington Park mansion with its extensive grounds. Under the terms of the voluntary liquidation the company continued to operate in the premises at 100 Grenfell Street.

Under the new management the company progressed from the world of saddles and harness to motor vehicle bodies and upholstery.
