= John Holden =

John Holden may refer to:

- John C. Holden (born 1934), American geologist
- John Holden (Australian politician) (1810–1860)
- John Rose Holden (1821–1879), Canadian politician and lawyer
- John Holden (bishop) (1882–1949), missionary of the Anglican Church
- John Holden (artist) (born 1942), English artist
- John Holden (British Army officer) (1913–1995)
- John Burt Holden (1873–1928), Justice of the Supreme Court of Mississippi
- Andy Holden (athlete) (John Andrew Holden, 1948–2014), English long-distance runner

== See also ==
- Jon Robert Holden (born 1976), basketball player
- Jack Holden (disambiguation)
- Holden (surname)
