= Harry Holden =

Harry Holden may refer to:

- Harry Holden (Home and Away), a fictional character from Home and Away
- Sir Harry Cassie Holden, 2nd Baronet (1877–1965) of the Holden baronets

== See also ==
- Henry Holden (disambiguation)
- Harold Holden, artist
