= Holden Medical Institute =

Coordinates: 42.791196°N 71.520255°W

Holden Medical Institute was an accredited nursing school with campuses in Lowell and Worcester, Massachusetts, and Nashua, New Hampshire. The Nashua campus was shut down by the state of New Hampshire in April 2008 due to concerns about the school's financial viability and their inability to pay bills.

The school trained licensed practical nurses and certified nurse assistants. It also offered courses in cardiopulmonary resuscitation and first aid. Some students were able to finish their programs elsewhere when Holden was shut down, although there was concern about the ability to transfer credits.

The Massachusetts campuses were included on a state government list of illegal nursing programs in 2014. Graduates of programs on the list were ineligible for licensure in the US.
