= Robert Holden (author) =

British psychologist and author (born 1965)

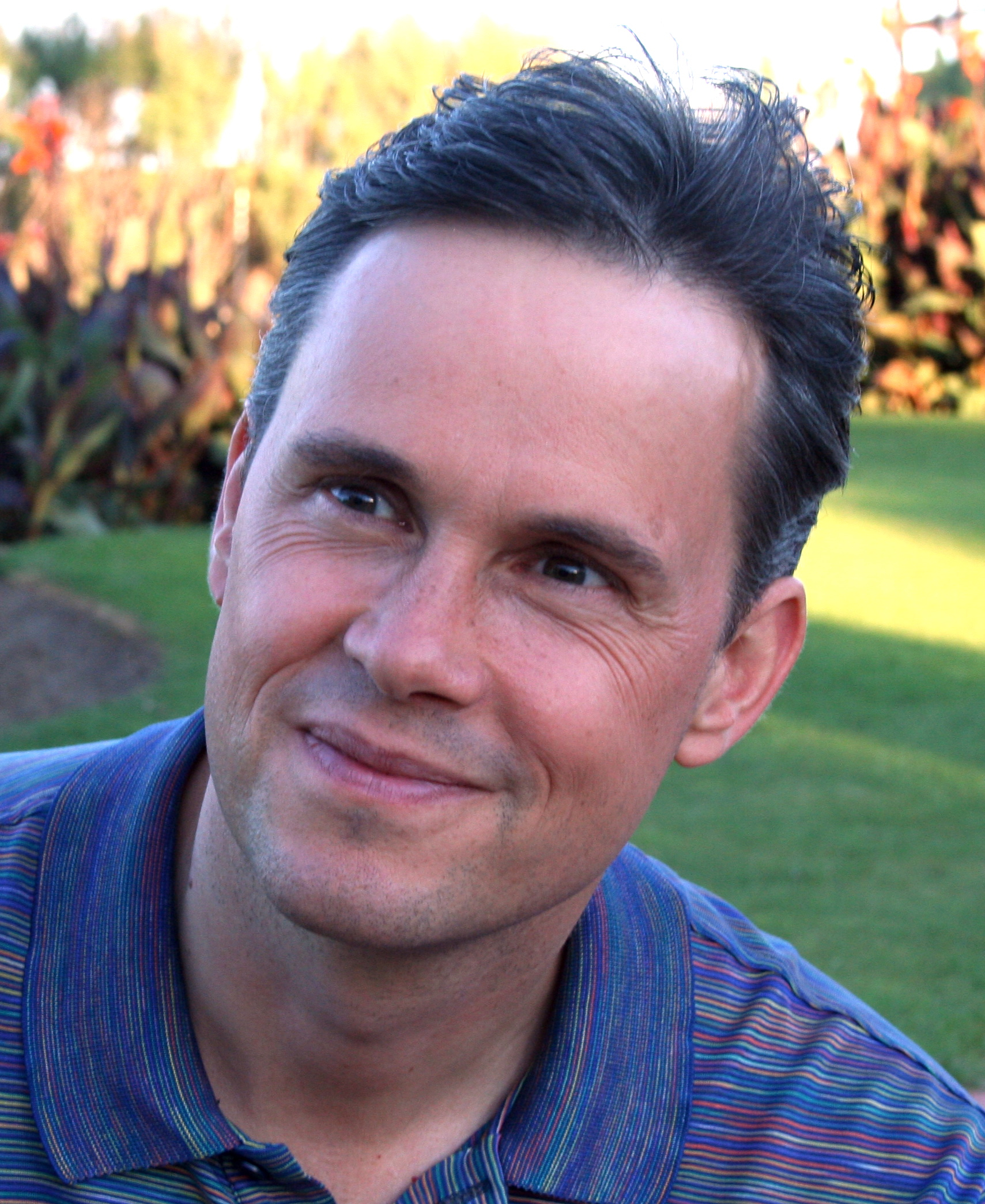
- Born: 1965 (age 60–61); Nairobi, Kenya
- Occupations: Author, broadcaster, Coach, public speaker
- Writing career
- Genres: Psychology, Spirituality
- Subjects: Happiness, Success, Love
- Website: www.robertholden.org

Robert Holden (born 1965) is a British psychologist, author, and broadcaster, who works in the field of positive psychology and well-being. He is the founder of The Happiness Project, which runs an eight-week course annually, called "Happiness Now", and the author of several books, including Happiness Now!, Be Happy, Success Intelligence and Shift Happens!. He runs the National Health Service (NHS) Stress Buster clinic, established first NHS "laughter clinic", and runs regular happiness workshops and seminars, with clients including employees of the NHS, the BBC and British Telecom.

Holden is a personal and professional coach, and the Director of The Happiness Project and Success Intelligence, through which he gives public lectures worldwide and holds public and corporate workshops and seminars for companies such as Dove, Virgin, The Body Shop and Unilever.

The Happiness Project, founded in England, featured in on two BBC TV documentaries: The Happiness Formula and How to be Happy (Q.E.D.). Holden hosts a weekly talk radio show on Hay House Radio, and appeared on The Oprah Winfrey Show in April 2007.

== Biography ==
Holden was born in Nairobi, Kenya. In 1989, he founded the NHS Stress Buster Clinic (laughter clinic) in Birmingham, England. He founded "The Happiness Project" in 1994 and Success Intelligence Ltd in 2000. Holden is the author of ten books, published in 14 languages, including Be Happy: Release The Power of Happiness in You, Happiness Now!, Laughter The Best Medicine, Shift Happens!: Powerful Ways to Transform Your Life, Stress Busters, and Success Intelligence. He has also appeared on The Oprah Winfrey Show.

== Bibliography ==
- Balancing Work and Life, with Ben Renshaw. Dorling Kindersley, 2002. ISBN 0-7894-8411-0.
- Happiness Now!: Timeless Wisdom for Feeling Good Fast, Hay House, October 2007. ISBN 1-4019-2039-X.
- Success Intelligence, Hay House, May 2009. ISBN 1-4019-2171-X.
- Shift Happens!: Powerful Ways to Transform Your Life, Jeffers Press, October 2006. ISBN 0-9777618-2-7.
- Be Happy: Release the Power of Happiness in You, Hay House, April 2009. ISBN 1-4019-2180-9.
- Happiness Now! Perpetual Flip Calendar, Hay House, November 2008. ISBN 1-4019-2313-5.
- Success Now! Perpetual Flip Calendar. Hay House, November 2010. ISBN 978-1-4019-2394-5.
- Shift Happens!: How to Live and Inspired Life Starting from NOW!, Hay House, September 2010. ISBN 978-1-84850-168-3.
- Happiness NOW!: Timeless wisdom for feeling good fast, Hay House, January 2011. ISBN 978-1-84850-170-6.
- Authentic Success: Essential Lessons and Practices from the World's Leading Coaching Program on Success Intelligence, Hay House, 2011. ISBN 1-4019-2824-2.

== See also ==
- Happiness
- Forgiveness

== Interview ==
- Book Excerpt: 'Be Happy: The Power of Happiness in You', Robert Holden at ABC News
