= Holden High School =

Holden High School may refer to:

- Holden High School (California) in Orinda, California
- Holden High School (Louisiana) in Holden, Louisiana
- Holden High School (Missouri) in Holden, Missouri
