= Holden (given name) =

Holden is an English given name that comes from a surname meaning "deep valley" in Old English. The most well-known use of Holden as a given name is in J. D. Salinger's 1951 novel The Catcher in the Rye, in which the protagonist bears the name Holden Caulfield. In the US, Holden began rising in use in 1986 after Holden Snyder became a character on the soap opera As the World Turns.

Holden is the given name of:

== People ==
- Holden Bowler (1912–2001), American athlete, singer and businessman
- Holden Furber (1903–1993), American historian and professor
- Holden Karnofsky, American nonprofit executive
- Holden Powell (born 1999), American baseball player
- Holden C. Richardson (1878–1960), pioneer in U.S. naval aviation
- Holden Roberto (1923–2007), founder and leader of the National Liberation Front of Angola
- Holden Staes (born 2003), American football player
- Holden Thorp (born 1964), American chemist, inventor, musician, professor, and entrepreneur
- Holden Trent (1999–2024), American soccer player

== Fictional characters ==
- Holden Carver, the main character in the DC Comics/Wildstorm comic book series Sleeper
- Holden Caulfield, the main character in J. D. Salinger's novel The Catcher in the Rye
- Holden Ford, a main character in the TV series Mindhunter
- Holden Matthews, the main character in the TV series Beyond
- Holden McNeil, played by Ben Affleck in three films: Chasing Amy, Jay and Silent Bob Strike Back, and Jay and Silent Bob Reboot
- Holden Snyder, from the soap opera As the World Turns
- Holden, aka Space Cop, the main character of the 2016 science-fiction action comedy film Space Cop
