= Lewis Holden =

New Zealand public servant and economist

Lewis Dare Holden

Deputy Commissioner (Auckland) of the State Services Commission
- In office March 2015 – April 2020

Chief Executive of the Ministry of Culture and Heritage
- In office June 2009 – March 2015

Deputy Secretary of the New Zealand Ministry of Economic Development
- In office November 2001 – June 2009

Alternative Executive Director at the World Bank

Lewis Dare Holden is a former New Zealand public servant and economist. Before his retirement in 2020 he was the Deputy Commissioner for Auckland at the State Services Commission. Prior to this appointment he was the Chief Executive of the Ministry for Culture and Heritage. Holden was previously deputy secretary of the economic strategy branch at the Ministry of Economic Development.

Lewis Dare Holden is not the Lewis Joseph Holden who is the campaign chair for New Zealand Republic. They are not related.

== Education ==
Holden has a BA (Honours) from Victoria University of Wellington, a Diploma in Journalism from the University of Canterbury and a Masters of Public and Private Management from Yale School of Management. While at Victoria, Holden was elected to the executive of Victoria University of Wellington Students' Association.

== Career ==
Holden was appointed Deputy Commissioner in March 2015 after being the Chief Executive of the Ministry for Culture and Heritage since June 2009. Prior to joining the Ministry for Culture and Heritage, Holden was Deputy Secretary of the Ministry of Economic Development. Before that, Holden worked for the New Zealand Treasury, and worked in the Department of the Prime Minister and Cabinet as an economic advisor for Jim Bolger. Holden also spent a term as Alternative Executive Director at the World Bank in Washington DC.

Holden was instrumental in developing the previous Labour governments' "regional development" and "economic transformation" policy agenda (such as the development of the New Zealand film industry), and undertook a stock take of government programs and their impact on New Zealand business. Holden held the position as Deputy Secretary of the MED from November 2001. In October 2006, he became Deputy Secretary of the new Economic Strategy branch.

Holden also worked as a researcher for the 1986 Royal Commission on the Electoral System, which initiated electoral reform in New Zealand.
