= Margaret Holden =

British botanist, biochemist (1920–1998)

Margaret Holden (died 1998) was a British botanist, biochemist and a local historian.

Holden's father was a nurseryman, who gave her a strong interest in plants. As Margaret was learning to speak, her father would also teach her to say the Latin names of plants. She later reported that she learned these before their common names.

Holden studied botany at University College, London and completed her studies at the Lister Institute of Medicine. She published an article on pectinase in 1946. In February 1944, she took position in the Biochemistry Department at the Rothamsted Experimental Station in Harpenden, among other areas working on fungal biology. After working at the Rothamsted Experimental Station, Holden wanted to experience something different and decided to travel to Ghana in Africa to study the chemistry of flavour development in the fermented cocoa bean and to also study swollen root virus, which is a root disease that infects the cocoa bean. When she was ready to return to Rothamsted, she began to focus her time on studying the breakdown of chlorophyll, the photosynthetic pigment in plants. Leading up to her retirement, she worked on the diseases that infect wheat.

Holden wrote a history of Rothamsted's early history, A Brief History of Rothamsted Experimental Station from 1843 to 1901, in 1972, describing the facility as "Harpenden’s only real claim to fame". Holden died in 1998.
