= Thomas Holden =

Thomas Holden may refer to:

- Thomas Holden (general) (1741–1823), American Revolutionary War General and Justice of the Rhode Island Supreme Court
- Thomas Douglas Percy Holden (1859–1938), Australian politician
- Thomas Sinclair Holden (1906–1973), Australian politician and judge and son of Thomas Douglas Percy Holden
- Tim Holden or Thomas Timothy Holden (born 1957), United States politician
