= Robert Holden (cricketer) =

English cricketer and British Army officer

Personal information
- Full name: Robert Holden
- Born: 24 July 1805; Spondon, Derbyshire, England
- Died: 11 November 1872 (aged 67); Marylebone, Middlesex, England
- Batting: Unknown
- Relatives: Henry Holden (brother); Thomas Pearson (nephew)

Domestic team information
- Years: Team
- 1835–1836: Marylebone Cricket Club

Career statistics
Competition	First-class
Matches	5
Runs scored	70
Batting average	11.66
100s/50s	–/–
Top score	22
Catches/stumpings	2/–
- Source: Cricinfo, 12 September 2021

Robert Holden DL (24 July 1805 — 11 November 1872) was an English first-class cricketer and British Army officer.

The son of Robert Holden and Mary Anne Drury Lowe, he was born at Spondon in July 1805. He was commissioned into the Sherwood Rangers Yeomanry as a second lieutenant in May 1828. He played first-class cricket for the Marylebone Cricket Club in 1835 and 1836, making five appearances. He scored 70 runs in his five matches, with a highest score of 22. He was promoted to captain in the Sherwood Rangers in April 1835, with promotion to lieutenant colonel in April 1848. In March 1848, he replaced John Manners-Sutton as High Sheriff of Nottinghamshire. In April 1859, he was appointed a lieutenant colonel commandant in the Sherwood Rangers, while in August of the same year he was appointed a deputy lieutenant of Nottinghamshire. Holden travelled to London in November 1872 for medical treatment, where he died at Marylebone. His brother, Henry, and nephew Thomas Pearson both played first-class cricket.
