= Moulden =

Moulden is a surname. Notable people with the surname include:

- Beaumont Arnold Moulden (1849–1926), lawyer and politician in South Australia
- Frank Beaumont Moulden (1876–1932), his son, lawyer and Lord Mayor of Adelaide
- Horace M. Moulden (born 1898), British trade union leader
- Julia Moulden, Canadian writer
- Paul Moulden (born 1967), English footballer

== See also ==
- Moulden, Northern Territory, suburb of Palmerston, Australia
