= Holden (band) =

French pop duo

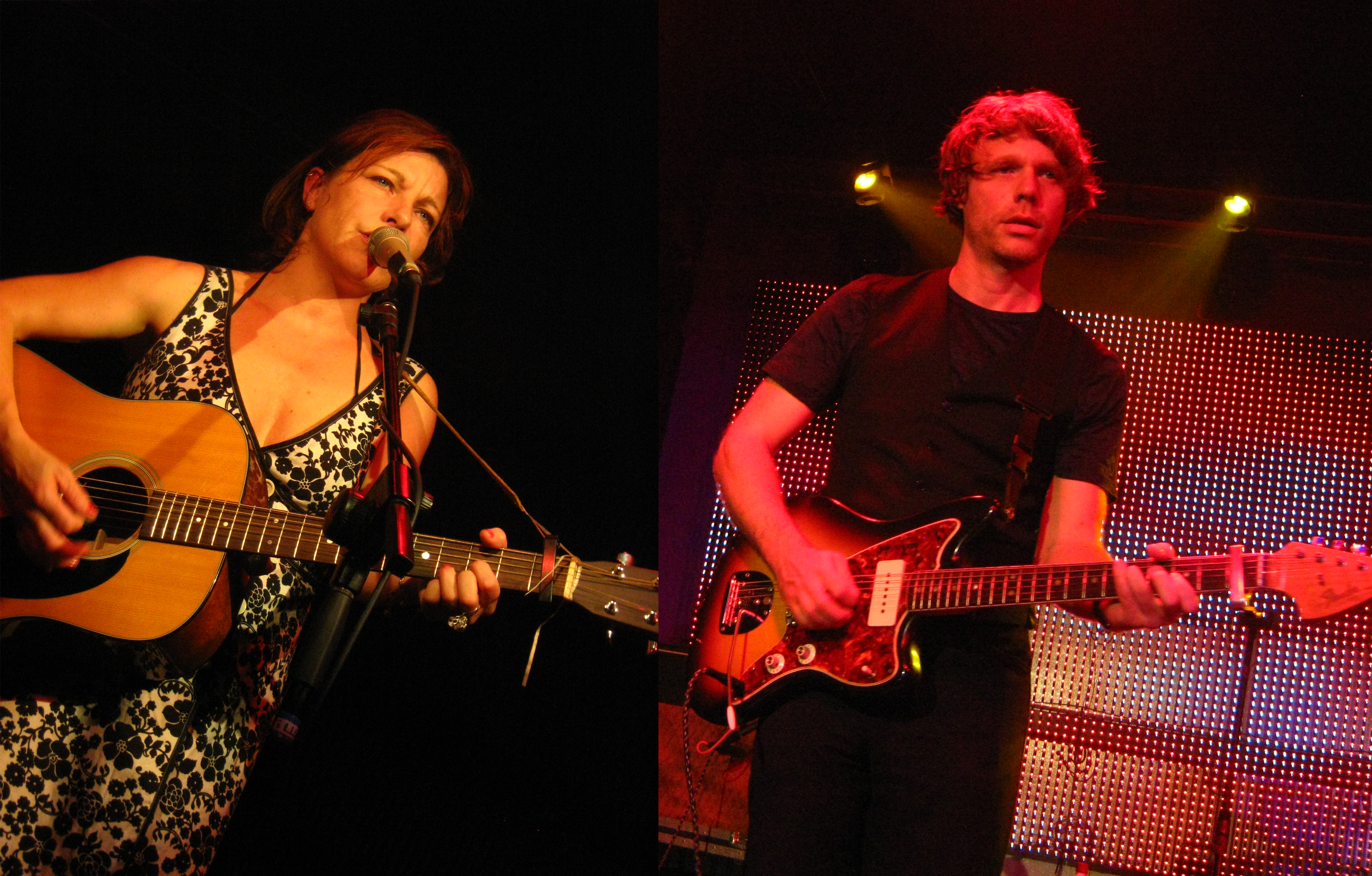
- Holden in 2009 (live concert)

Background information
- Origin: France
- Genres: Indie pop, Indie rock
- Years active: 1990s-present
- Labels: Village Vert, Lithium, Watusa
- Members: Armelle Pioline, Dominique Dépret a.k.a. Mocke, Pierre-Jean Grapin, Evan Evans, Richard Cousin

Holden is a French pop rock duo that began recording in 1997. The band members are Armelle Pioline (vocals) and Dominique Dépret (a.k.a. Mocke, guitar), with help from Pierre-Jean Grapin (drums), Evan Evans (keyboard) and Richard Cousin (bass).

Holden released "L'arrière monde" in 1998. In 2001, they met the producer Señor Coconut a.k.a. Atom a.k.a. Uwe Schmidt, who mixed their second album, 'Pedrolira' (2002). Thanks to him, they became famous in Chile, where they recorded their third album, "Chevrotine" (2006).

== Discography ==
Album	Record Label	Year	Peak France
L'arrière-monde	Lithium	1998	
Pedrolira	Village Vert	2002	
Chevrotine	Village Vert	2006	86
Fantômatisme	Village Vert	2009	
Essentiel	Watusa	2011	
Sideration	Watusa	2013	
