= Robert Holden (photographer) =

Robert Holden is a photographer, journeyer, and environmentalist. His work revolves around the humanistic idea of travel. The journey and the encounter are his main themes. His photographic approach is subjective and emotional. Many of his projects are based on reality but often combine a personal narrative, and are "symbolic of today's evolutionary development, straddling between reportage photography and art with a social message."

In 2011, his series, The Treehouse, was installed as a non-profit exhibition of large-scale prints on building façades in DUMBO, Brooklyn, curated by Vamos Architects in conjunction with the New York Photo Festival.

He contributes regularly, with his editorial work, to select international publications.

== Travel photography ==
Since 2007, Holden's style has evolved from documenting specific editorial assignments to photographing his travel experience through an intuitive, non-descriptive, and narrative style. This is most present in the freehand photographic editorials for Air France Magazine when he traveled with French writers such as Elisabeth Barillé, Stephane Audeguy, François Simon, and Marc Lambron.

His photographic style—along with that of a few other photographers—has led to a visual redefinition of travel photography in France "… allowing us to soar in thought. They are heirs of Saul Leiter and Wong Kar-wai, the offspring of still and moving image, and are born out of poetry and disillusionment."

== Bibliography ==
- Philippe-Michel Thibault and Anaïs Leclerc, Air France L'Art Du Voyage, (Paris: Découvertes Gallimard vol. 535, 2008).
