= Holden Lutheran Church Parsonage =

Historic church in Minnesota, United States

- U.S. National Register of Historic Places
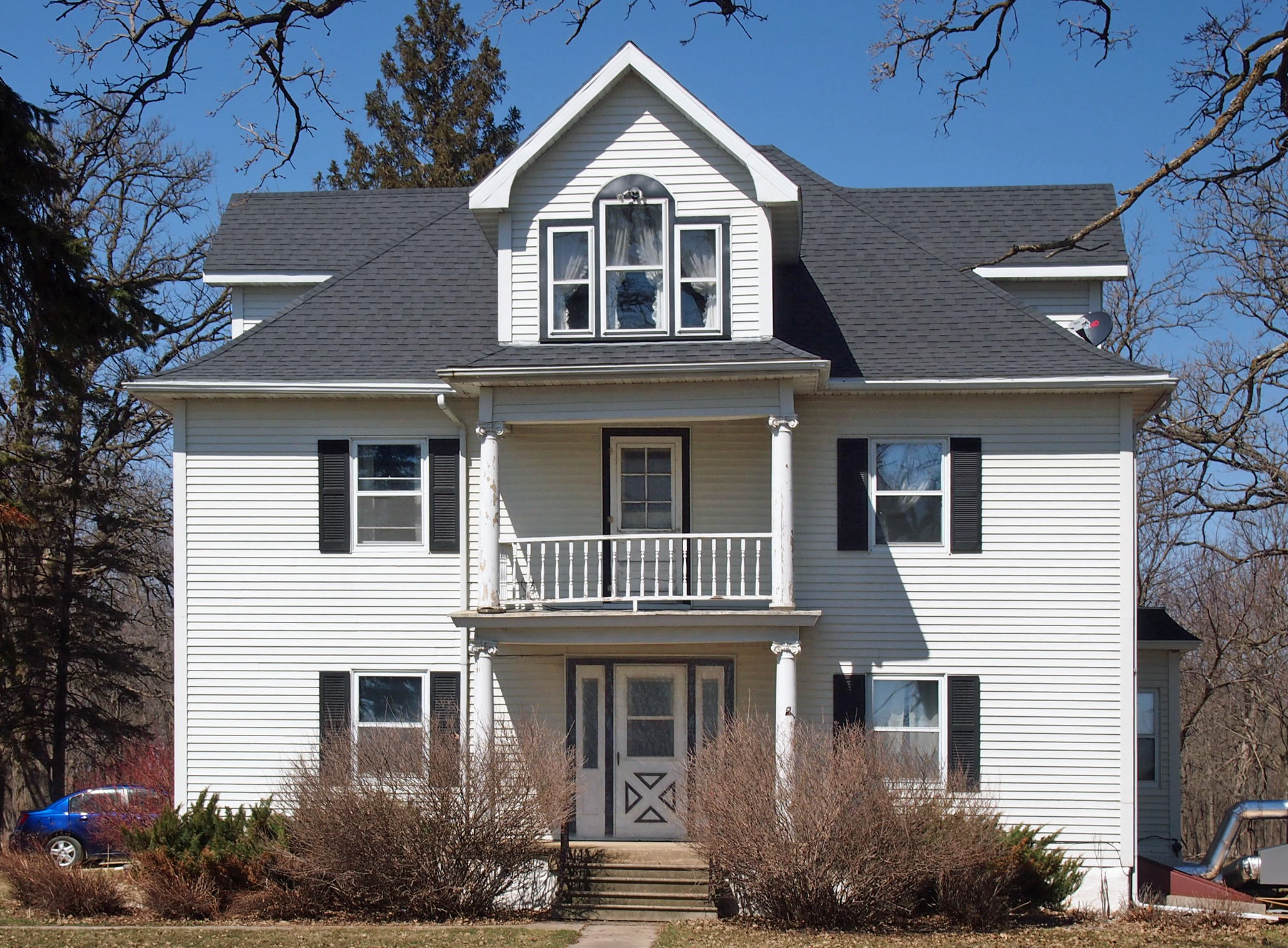
- Holden Lutheran Church Parsonage from the south

- Location within Minnesota Location within the United States
- Nearest city: Kenyon, Minnesota
- Coordinates: 44°19′13″N 92°54′9″W
- Area: less than one acre
- Built: c. 1861
- Architectural style: Corn-belt cube
- MPS: Rural Goodhue County MRA
- NRHP reference No.: 80002049
- Added to NRHP: February 12, 1980

Holden Lutheran Church Parsonage is a historic church parsonage at Kenyon in Wanamingo Township, Goodhue County, Minnesota. The building is located on the north side of Goodhue County Highway 8. The building was added to the National Register in 1980.

The house was built circa 1861 as the parsonage for Holden Lutheran Church. With successive enlargements and alterations, it was the residence of Reverend Bernt Julius Muus, who served as the first resident pastor of the congregation until 1899. In 1869, Rev. Muus founded the Holden Academy in the parsonage as an institution of higher religious education. He served as principal of the academy until 1874. The distance from a rail line compelled him to encourage the founding of St. Olaf College in Northfield, Minnesota. Rev. Muus was also bishop of the Minnesota District of the Synod of the Norwegian Evangelical Lutheran Church in America which he served until shortly before his death in 1900.

== Related reading ==
- Shaw, Joseph M. (1999) Bernt Julius Muus: Founder of St. Olaf College (Norwegian-American Historical Association) ISBN 0-87732-088-8
