= Kisha B. Holden =

Professor of Psychiatry & Behavioral Sciences

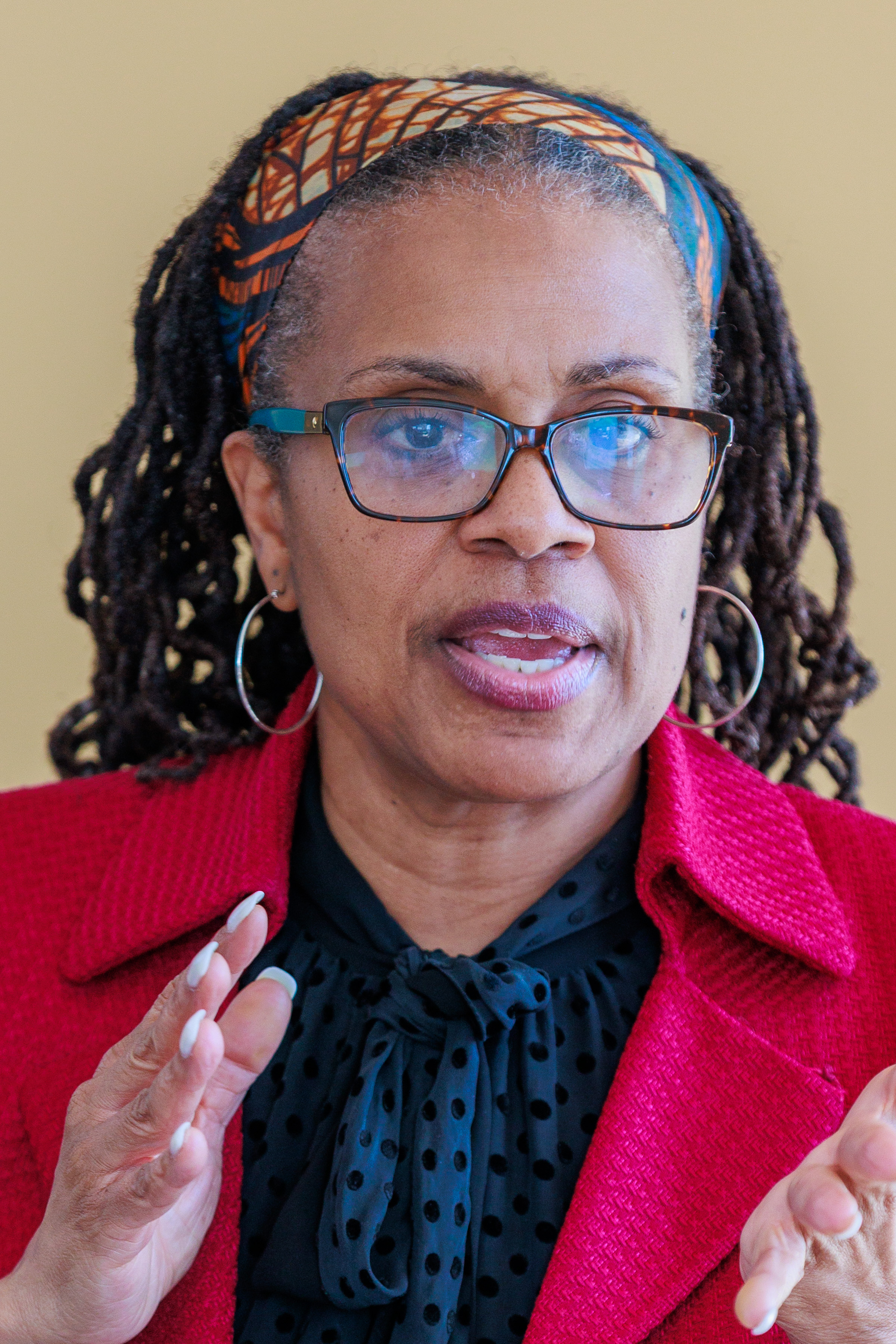
- Occupations: Professor of Psychiatry & Behavioral Sciences and Community Health & Preventive Medicine
- Spouse: Elton Holden
- Awards: APA Division on Women, Carolyn Payton Early Career Award

Academic background
- Education: Howard University

Kisha Braithwaite Holden is a scientist known for her research on mental health of African-Americans and members of other minority groups. She is professor of psychiatry and behavioral sciences and community health & preventive medicine and interim director of Satcher Health Leadership Institute (SHLI) at Morehouse School of Medicine.

Holden is the recipient of the 2013 APA Division on Women's Carolyn Payton Early Career Award. She received fellowships including the 2008–2009 African American Mental Health Research Scientist Fellowship from the National Institute of Mental Health, 2009–2010 Early Career Minority Faculty Fellowship from the American Psychological Association (APA), 2011 Association of American Medical Colleges (AAMC) Early Career Women Faculty Professional Development Fellowship, 2014 AAMC Mid-Career Women Faculty Professional Development Fellowship, 2015 AAMC Mid-Career Minority Faculty Development Seminar, 2016–2017 APA Office of Women's Programs' Leadership Institute for Women in Psychology, and 2018 Brandeis University's C-Change Leadership & Mentoring Institute.

In 2012, Holden co-authored Social Determinants of Health Among African-American Men with Henrie M. Treadwell, and Clare Xanthos.

== Biography ==
Holden received her Bachelor of Science in psychology (1993), master's degree (1997), and doctorate in counseling psychology (2003) at Howard University. She completed a postdoctoral fellowship focusing on community-based participatory research in mental health at Johns Hopkins University between 2003 and 2005. Holden then earned a Master of Science in clinical research at Morehouse School of Medicine in 2012.

Holden served as the research director for the Children's National Medical Center between 2001 and 2003. She then joined Morehouse School of Medicine's Department of Psychiatry and Behavioral Sciences in 2005, where she worked as an assistant professor of clinical psychiatry until 2010. In 2011, Holden became an associate professor at the Department of Psychiatry and Behavioral Sciences, and Community Health and Preventive Medicine at Morehouse School of Medicine. Between 2012 and 2013, she served as the director of Community Voices: Healthcare for the Underserved, and as the interim research director of SHLI. She then became the deputy director of SHLI in 2013 and the interim director in 2015.

Holden is married to Elton Holden and has a stepdaughter named Michele.

== Research ==
Holden's work focuses on "encouraging mental health and well-being among ethnically and culturally diverse families" with a particular emphasis on underserved and underrepresented populations through research and programming. Her aims include promoting the quality of community-based clinical and translational mental health research, developing programs to improve individual accessibility to comprehensive healthcare, and develop cultural and gender-specific resilience-based prevention and intervention models for individuals at risk for depression.

She research received funding from organizations including the APA Office of Ethnic Minority Affairs, National Institute of Health, National Institute of Mental Health, and National Institute on Drug Abuse.

Holden is a principal investigator at the Transdisciplinary Collaborative Center (TCC) at the Morehouse School of Medicine which aims to eliminate health disparity, especially among the underserved, ethically, and culturally diverse populations. She writes for the monthly TCC Kaleidoscope Column which focuses on topics related to TCC's mission of advancing health equity.

Holden is engaging in the TCC project THRIVE, Towards Health Recovery and Integrated Vital Engagement which aims to create a culturally sensitive and integrated behavioral health model targeting depression and co-morbid chronic diseases in the primary care setting for adults.

== Representative publications ==
- Holden, K. B., Hall, S. P., Robinson, M., Triplett, S., Babalola, D., Plummer, V., ... & Bradford, L. D. (2012). Psychosocial and sociocultural correlates of depressive symptoms among diverse African American women. Journal of the National Medical Association, 104(11-12), 493-504.
- Holden, K. B., McGregor, B. S., Blanks, S. H., & Mahaffey, C. (2012). Psychosocial, socio-cultural, and environmental influences on mental health help-seeking among African-American men. Journal of Men's Health, 9(2), 63-69.
- Holden, K., McGregor, B., Thandi, P., Fresh, E., Sheats, K., Belton, A., ... & Satcher, D. (2014). Toward culturally centered integrative care for addressing mental health disparities among ethnic minorities. Psychological Services, 11(4), 357–368.
- Holden, K. B., McKenzie, R., Pruitt, M. V., Aaron, M. K., & Hall, M. S. (2012). Depressive symptoms, substance abuse, and intimate partner violence among pregnant women of diverse ethnicities. Journal of Health Care for the Poor and Underserved, 23(1), 226-241.
- Treadwell, H. M., Xanthos, C., & Holden, K. B. (2012). Social determinants of health among African-American men. John Wiley & Sons.
