= Bill Holden (schoolteacher) =

American schoolteacher and fundraiser

- Born: 1948 (age 77–78); Elgin, Illinois, United States
- Education: Southern Illinois University
- Occupation: Teacher
- Known for: 2,100-mile fundraising walk for the American Diabetes Association

Bill Holden (born 1948) is a teacher who embarked on a 2,100 mile (3,400 km) walk, from Arizona to Chicago, during 2005, hoping to raise $250,000 dollars to be donated to the American Diabetes Association so that a cure for juvenile diabetes can be found. Holden made national headlines with his walk.

== Biography ==
Bill Holden was born in 1948 in Elgin, Illinois. He grew up at the beginning of the television era in the United States. His father was a die-hard baseball fan. In 1957, Holden had his first in-person baseball experience, going to a Chicago Cubs home game. Holden became a lifetime Cubs fan instantly, and Ron Santo became Holden's favorite player.

Holden graduated from Southern Illinois University in 1970 and got his first job as a teacher in 1973. He spent his entire career as a schoolteacher. He became interested in teaching Native American children, so, after many years teaching in the Illinois public schools system, he relocated to Camp Verde, Arizona. At Camp Verde, he became aware of the alarming incidence of diabetes among Indian children. He started teaching groups of children that suffered from the disease.

On New Year's Eve 2004, his son presented him with the docu-film This Old Cub, based on Santo's experience as a diabetic player in MLB. After watching the film many times, Holden became inspired and convinced that he needed to do something to help find a cure for diabetes.

== The walk ==
On January 11, 2005, Holden began his walk, hoping to cover at least 12 miles each day. Holden crossed over six states, including New Mexico, Texas, Oklahoma and Missouri, apart from Arizona and Illinois. He had to battle weariness and summer heat along the way. According to his own account, Holden had a brush with death when he was about to get run over by a car, but the drivers recognized him and waved.

Holden had told Santo about the fundraising walk before it took place, and Santo called Holden every few days while he was on the road.

On June 29, Holden arrived at Harry Caray's restaurant in Rosemont, Illinois. He overnighted there, as he had previously done in several odd places and small hotels.

After arriving at the famous Cubs baseball stadium, Wrigley Field, on July 1, Holden, who was joined by Illinois Governor Rod Blagojevich during the final steps of his walk, threw that day's symbolic first pitch to Kerry Wood, as the Cubs played the Washington Nationals. During the game's seventh inning stretch, he and Santo sang "Take Me Out to the Ballgame".

His fund-raising walk made headlines in newspapers across his home country, including The Arizona Republic and many others.

Ron Santo told reporters, "When he mentioned the fact that he was going to walk from Arizona to Wrigley Field to raise money for diabetes, I couldn't believe it! Then, when I heard he was 20 miles away, I'm saying 'get in the car and drive it. You've made it!' But he said, 'Nope, I'm going to walk'. I mean, think about that. It's amazing!"
