= Bill Holden (ice hockey) =

Canadian ice hockey player

- Born: July 23, 1949 (age 76) Toronto, Ontario, Canada
- Height: 5 ft 11 in (180 cm)
- Weight: 170 lb (77 kg; 12 st 2 lb)
- Position: Goaltender
- Caught: Left
- Played for: Toronto Toros; Winnipeg Jets
- NHL draft: Undrafted
- Playing career: 1973–1974

William Holden (born July 23, 1949) is a Canadian former professional ice hockey player who played in the World Hockey Association (WHA). Holden played two games for the Toronto Toros and Winnipeg Jets during the 1973–74 WHA season.

== Career statistics ==
			Regular season									Playoffs
Season	Team	League	GP	W	L	T	MIN	GA	SO	GAA	SV%	GP	W	L	T	MIN	GA	SO	GAA	SV%
1973–74	Winnipeg Jets	WHA	1	0	1	0	60	4	0	4.00	.857	—	—	—	—	—	—	—	—	—
1973–74	Toronto Toros	WHA	1	1	0	0	10	0	0	0.00	1.000	—	—	—	—	—	—	—	—	—
WHA totals			2	1	1	0	70	4	0	3.43	.886	—	—	—	—	—	—	—	—	—
