= Henry Holden (police officer) =

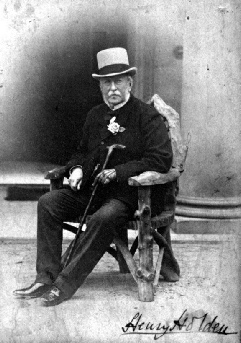

Personal information
- Full name: Henry Holden
- Born: 26 August 1823; Locko Park, Derbyshire, England
- Died: 1 February 1900 (aged 76); Bramcote Hills, Nottinghamshire, England
- Batting: Unknown
- Relatives: Robert Holden (brother); Thomas Pearson (nephew)

Domestic team information
- Years: Team
- 1853: Sussex

Career statistics
Competition	First-class
Matches	1
Runs scored	0
Batting average	0.00
100s/50s	–/–
Top score	0
Catches/stumpings	1/–
- Source: Cricinfo, 18 June 2012

Henry Holden, DL, JP (26 August 1823 – 1 February 1900) was an English soldier and Chief Constable of Nottinghamshire. He was also an amateur cricketer and controversial cricket administrator who played a part in one of the first strikes by professional cricketers in 1881. As a player, Holden's batting style is unknown.

== Early life ==
The son of Robert Holden and Mary Anne Drury Lowe, he was born at Locko Park, Derbyshire.

== Professional career ==
Holden served in the British Army where he reached the rank of captain in the 38th Regiment. He was also the Chief Constable of Nottinghamshire from 1856 to 1892 and a Justice of the Peace. In 1892 he was appointed a Deputy Lieutenant of Nottinghamshire.

== Cricket career ==
He made a single first-class appearance for Sussex against Nottinghamshire in 1853 at Trent Bridge. Nottinghamshire batted first, making 100 all out. In response, Sussex made 98 all out in their first-innings, with Holden, who captained the county in what was his only game for them, being dismissed for a duck by John Bickley. Nottinghamshire were then dismissed for just 69 in their second-innings to set Sussex 72 for victory. Sussex succeeded in their chase to win by three wickets, with Holden not required to bat.

=== Nottinghamshire secretary ===
He became the secretary of Nottinghamshire County Cricket Club in 1874, in what was to be a somewhat controversial tenure in that role. In 1880, the Australians toured England, making considerable money from gate receipts, something English cricketers, regarded as "gentlemen" did not do. Nottinghamshire's Alfred Shaw, however, saw this as an opportunity. He arranged a first-class match between the Players of the North and the Australians at Park Avenue, Bradford toward the end of the tour, which made Shrewsbury a healthy profit. A few days after this match, he hastily arranged a match between Nottinghamshire and the Australians at Trent Bridge. Seeking once more to make money, Shaw informed Holden that himself and six other Nottinghamshire players would only take to the field for a minimum of £20 each. Holden agreed, albeit reluctantly, and was reported to be privately fuming at the demand. In the Autumn, Shaw attempted to arrange an early season fixture for the following season against Yorkshire, with the view of once again profiting from it. Holden found out about this and told Shaw he alone did not have the authority to arrange county fixtures. He proceeded to write to all of Nottinghamshire's professionals, informing them they would have to sign a binding contract under which they would have to be available for all official Nottinghamshire matches. Shaw, Arthur Shrewsbury, William Barnes, Wilfred Flowers, Fred Morley, William Scotton and John Selby disagreed with his proposal.

They countered with their own three-point proposal. They firstly asked that the unofficial Yorkshire fixture be allowed to take place, secondly, that after ten years service to the county a player was awarded a benefit, and thirdly that all seven of them be allowed to take part in all Nottinghamshire matches in 1881. All seven rebel players played in Nottinghamshire's first match of 1881, but following the committee rejecting the first of their two proposals, resulting in the players striking. Such was their distrust of Holden, they refused any resolution talks in which Holden was present, but the committee demanded he be there, resulting in a stalemate for much of the season and Nottinghamshire fielding a virtual second XI. Holden asked the Marylebone Cricket Club to intervene in the dispute, which they did, resulting in the seven players returning. However, Holden re-ignited to dispute by leaving out Shrewsbury and Flowers from the team, resulting in all seven players resuming their strike. Holden approached the players toward the end of the season, with five of them returning, while Shrewsbury and Shaw apologised to the committee for their actions in 1882 and were welcomed back into the team. The strike was described as a historical moment between players and their relationship with their counties, with James Lillywhite writing in his Cricketers' Annual that, "It involved a distinct and material alteration in the relations between paid cricketers and their employers which vitally affected the interests of every club of any importance.".

=== 1882 dispute with the Australians ===
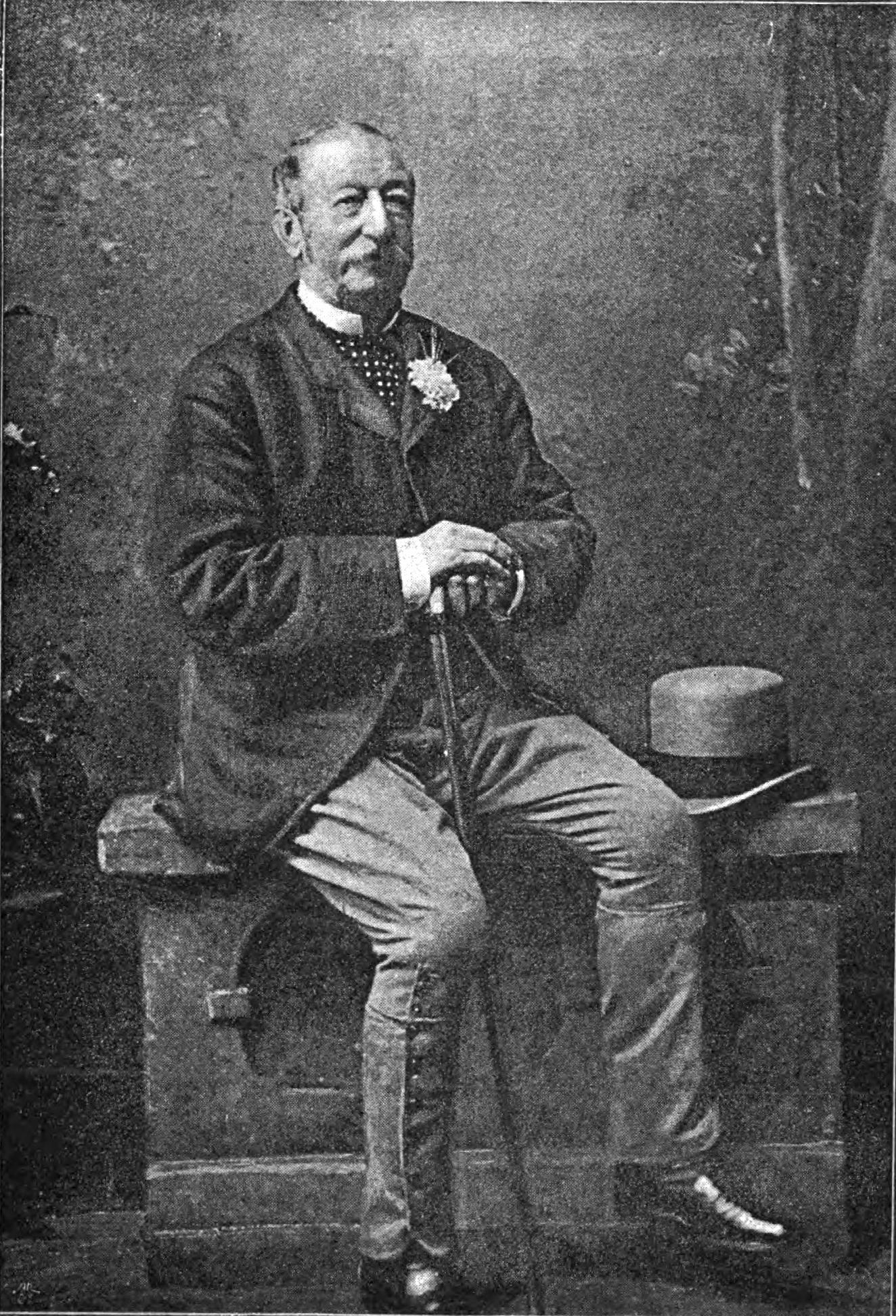
Henry Holden

During Australias 1882 tour to England, Nottinghamshire played a first-class match against the tourists at Trent Bridge. During lunch of one of the days the match was played over, the Australians discovered that no lunch had been provided for them. It was, in those days, custom for hosts to looks after amateur "gentlemen". Professionals were deemed to be those making money from playing, which the Australians were, and were therefore expected to provide their own lunch. Despite this, the Australians were enraged and confronted Holden, who had been in charge of lunch arrangements. In a heated exchange with the Australians manager Charles Beal and batsman George Bonnor, he told them he had "forgot" to provide lunch, then reminded them as paid professionals they were expected to find their own. Aggravated by the argument with Beal and Bonnor, Holden was reported to have then turned on Australian captain Billy Murdoch to remind him it was him, in his capacity of secretary, and not the umpires or team captains who had the right to demand when the pitch be rolled. Bonnor by this point was being restrained to avoid a physical altercation with Holden. During the night, a member of the Australian touring party chalked some derogatory remarks about Holden in the hotel in which the team was staying. When discovered, Holden openly accused Beal of writing the remarks. However, it was discovered that Holden himself had made the remarks in an attempt to get one over on Beal.

He also had a dispute with Lancashire captain A. N. Hornby during his tenure. He was invited to resign from his position by the Nottinghamshire committee in 1883.

== Personal life ==
In 1850, he married Isabella Cunard, daughter of Sir Samuel Cunard, 1st Baronet and Susan Duffus, in Halifax, Nova Scotia. The couple had seven children. Holden died at Bramcote Hills, Nottinghamshire, on 1 February 1900. His brother, Robert, and nephew, Thomas Pearson, both played first-class cricket.
