= Edward Holden =

Australian industrialist (1885–1947)

The Honourable Sir Edward Holden
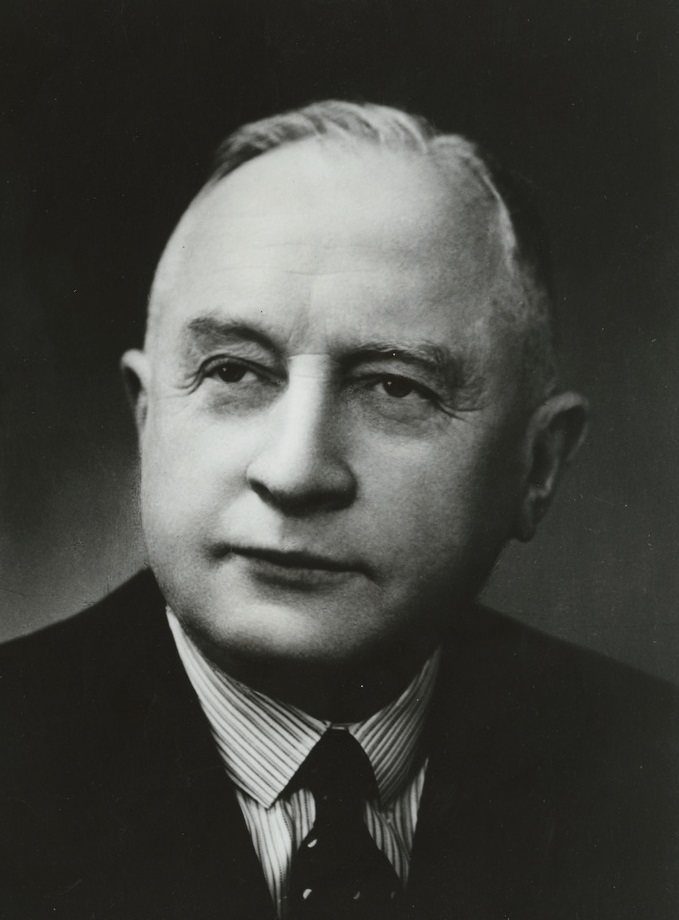

Chairman of Holden
- In office March 1934 – 17 June 1947

Director of Holden
- In office August 1917 – March 1934
- Preceded by: H. J. Holden
- Succeeded by: Laurence Hartnett

Member of the Legislative Council of South Australia
- In office 14 December 1935 – 10 January 1947
- Constituency: Central District #2

Personal details
- Born: Edward Wheewall Holden; 14 August 1885 College Town, Adelaide, South Australia, Australia
- Died: 17 June 1947 (aged 61) North Adelaide, Adelaide, South Australia, Australia
- Party: Liberal and Country League
- Spouse: Hilda Lavis (m. 1908; died 1947)
- Relations: H. J. Holden (father)
- Children: 3, including Dame Nancy
- Education: Prince Alfred College
- Occupation: Car manufacturer

Sir Edward Wheewall Holden (14 August 1885 – 17 June 1947) was an Australian industrialist who took his family carriage and saddlery business, Holden & Frost, into a partnership with General Motors to create Australia's first automobile manufacturer, General Motors-Holden's Ltd.

== Early years ==
Edward Holden was born at College Town (now St. Peters), the son of saddler and carriage-maker Henry James Holden (1859–1926) and his wife Mary Ann (née Wheewall). He was educated at Prince Alfred College and the University of Adelaide, where he graduated with a BSc in 1905 and joined the family firm Holden & Frost.

== Career ==
Edward saw the necessity for the firm to diversify into motor vehicles, initially maintaining and repairing (imported) automobile bodies then building motorcycle sidecars in a shed at the rear of the firm's Grenfell Street premises.

In 1917 the Australian Government introduced policies to restrict importation of fully manufactured motor cars to encourage the country's nascent automotive body building industry. Holden developed a relationship with America's General Motors (as Adelaide contemporary T. J. Richards did with Chrysler) to fit bodies to imported chassis. In 1919 Edward (as managing director) and his father founded a company Holden's Motor Body Builders with a factory at 400 King William Street later occupied by A. G. Healing Ltd. In 1923, following the signing of an exclusive agreement in Detroit with General Motors by Edward Holden, a new factory was set up at 879–895 Port Road, Cheltenham, employing the latest in production line technology. Automated mass-production techniques increased productivity spectacularly.

Edward Holden introduced to the business new standards of scientific management, cost accounting and production control. In close association with General Motors Export Co., Holdens established a dominant market position throughout mainland Australia.

By 1929 the company employed 3,400 workers and was the biggest automotive bodybuilder in the British Empire.

In October 1929 the plant closed temporarily for lack of continuous work, and in January 1930 Holden set out for the United States to discuss amalgamation with General Motors. In February 1931, General Motors offered £1,116,000 for Holden's, which was ultimately accepted. This reduced the cash burden of the merger for General Motors, while giving it complete control while maintaining an Australian character in name, ownership and management.

Holden was appointed executive chairman of directors and joint managing director of General Motors-Holden's Ltd. in August 1931 and later sole managing director. He was supplanted as managing director in 1934 by Laurence Hartnett but remained chairman until ill health forced his resignation in January 1947.

The advent of World War II saw a rapid switch of the motor body building plant at Woodville to war production. Early in 1941 it was almost fully committed to war production, and it was employing 20% more people than were on the normal peacetime payroll. He became honorary Controller-General of Army Canteens in 1939–45 and visited troops in the Middle East. The profits from army canteens, which were immense, initially went to improve camp facilities and the surplus of around £2,000,000 realised by the end of the war was distributed by the Australian Military Forces Special Benefits Committee to organisations whose membership was restricted to service personnel. Holden was sued for damages and taking bribes, but the case lapsed for lack of evidence.

Edward Holden was also prominent in many South Australian enterprises:

- Adelaide Cement Co. (including chairman of directors)
- Alma Shoes (including chairman of directors)
- Australian Cotton Textile Industries Limited (ACTIL)
- The Bank of Adelaide
- Colton, Palmer and Preston Ltd. (including chairman of directors)
- South Australian Brush Company (SABCO) (including chairman of directors)
- The Council of the University of Adelaide
- South Australian Industries Assistance Corporation
- Adelaide Chamber of Commerce
- The National Safety Council
- The Commonwealth Scientific and Industrial Research Organisation
- South Australian Chamber of Manufactures (and president from 1936 to 1939)
- Associated Chambers of Manufactures of Australia.

== Politics ==
He served for three years as councillor and alderman with the Adelaide City Council. In 1936 he was defeated in a bid to oust the sitting mayor, J. R. Cain.

In 1935 he was elected to the Central District No.2 seat in the Legislative Council of South Australia made vacant by the death of Labor's William Humphrey Harvey. Holden was a strong supporter of Premier Tom Playford's push to industrialize South Australia.

== Honours ==
In the New Year's Honours List of 1946, he was created a Knight Bachelor.

== Death ==
He died in North Adelaide of cerebro-vascular disease on 17 June 1947, aged 61, and was survived by his wife, Hilda May (née Lavis), a son and two daughters. One of those daughters was Senator Dame Nancy Buttfield, the first woman to represent South Australia in the Parliament of Australia.

== See also ==
- Holden
- Laurence Hartnett
