= H. J. Holden =

Henry James Holden (18 July 1859 – 6 March 1926) was an Australian businessman, a partner in Holden & Frost, which became the automobile manufacturer Holden. He was a longstanding member of the Kensington and Norwood Corporation, and served as mayor for nine years.

== History ==
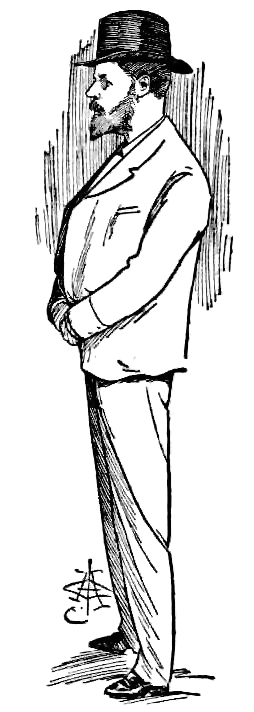
Henry James Holden, Mayor of Kensington and Norwood, South Australia

Henry was born in Adelaide the eldest child of James Alexander Holden (1 April 1835 – 1 June 1887) and his wife Mary Elizabeth Holden, née Phillips (9 December 1839 – 17 April 1914). He was educated at the Norwood College run by Thomas Caterer, followed by Hahndorf College.

In August 1885 J. A. Holden sold to Henry and to H. A. Frost his interest in the retail arm of the company, which was in financial difficulties. In November 1885 the company became Holden & Frost with the formal introduction into the partnership of Frost, who had brought to the company additional capital.

In 1886 J. A. Holden was declared insolvent. He put the wholesale arm of the business on the open market as well as the Grenfell Street warehouse. He put his Kensington Park house and grounds on the market for urgent sale. Under the terms of the voluntary liquidation, Holden & Frost continued to operate from the premises at 100 Grenfell Street, which was later purchased by Harris Scarfe

In 1899, with the advent of the Boer War, there arose a sudden demand for saddles, harness, leggings, Sam Browne belts and so on. Holden & Frost were quick to purchase new machinery and rent additional premises in Norwood, and their business thrived.

In 1905 Henry's son Edward Wheewall Holden graduated B.Eng from Adelaide University, and was admitted to the company. He foresaw the decline in horse transport, and seeing a future for the company in motor vehicles, encouraged his father to visit the United States to observe automobile manufacturing. Edward immediately began making fabric hoods and side-curtains for motor cars, and purchased his own car in 1913.

During World War I, in an austerity drive, the Australian Government put an embargo on the import of motor vehicles, but left open the importation of motor chassis. This left an opening for motor body builders to supply new cars to their wealthy clients, and Holden & Frost, though slow to seize the opportunity, made the most of it. Around August 1917 Holden & Frost began advertising for workers for their motor body building department at Grenfell Street, and took over the business of Fred. T. Hack Limited on King William Street (until 1913 Hack & Pengilly of 50–52 Flinders Street) for £9,000.

On 8 May 1918 Holden Motor Body Builders Limited was founded, with H. J. Holden as managing director and E. W. Holden and A. M. Lemon co-directors. A new factory was built at 376–400 King William Street South, between Halifax and Gilles Streets, and ironically in view of the later history of the Holden company, standardized on Dodge Brothers chassis.

His youngest son William Arthur Holden (17 December 1899 – 22 December 1929) served overseas during World War I, and on his return was brought into the company, and after five months' study in the US took charge of manufacturing. He died young, perhaps as a result of a riding accident.

Holden & Frost Limited, saddlers, continued to operate in Grenfell Street, despite fires in February 1903, October 1919, February 1920, The business was purchased by Harris Scarfe in 1923, and the Grenfell Street property became the major part of their Adelaide store.

== Civic interests ==
He was, like his father, involved with the Norwood Baptist church. He was president of the South Australian Baptist Union for 21 years

He was councillor with the Town of Norwood and Kensington from 1902, mayor 1904 to 1908 and alderman 1909 to 1912. He returned to the office of mayor in 1913 and retired at the end of 1916, in all nine years as mayor.

In March 1904 he was elected president of the Municipal Association; the last to be so elected: henceforth the Mayor of Adelaide was to be ex officio, president of the Association.

He represented the municipalities on the board of the Municipal Tramways Trust from 1907 to 1919, resigning in April 1919 amid imputations of corruption.

He was president of the South Australian branch of the YMCA for many years.

His wife was also recognised for her civic and charitable work; with the YWCA and, most notably, for the Red Cross.

== Family ==
Henry James Holden (18 July 1859 – 6 March 1926) married Mary Anne Dixon "Polly" Wheewall (16 March 1860 – 1926) on 7 April 1881, lived at "Warrinilla", 92 Osmond Tce., Norwood. She was a daughter of William Wheewall (c. 1823 – 16 September 1907). Among their children were:

- Sir Edward Wheewall Holden (14 August 1885 – 17 June 1947) married Hilda May Lavis (1887 – 6 August 1867) on 18 March 1908. He was a noted industrialist, lived at "Kalymna", 28 Dequetteville Terrace, Kent Town.

- Margaret Helen Holden (25 September 1909 – 12 October 2000) married I. Macdonald ( – )
- Nancy Eileen Holden (12 November 1912 – 4 September 2005) married Frank C. Buttfield ( – ) on 19 February 1936. As Dame Nancy Buttfield DBE she was a prominent senator for South Australia in the Australian Senate.

- son (27 March 1938 – )
- son (28 April 1940 – )

- John James "Jim" Holden (16 March 1919 – 30 November 2012) was a RAAF pilot

- Ida Caroline Mary Holden (20 July 1888 – ) married Leslie Wiles Peacock (1882–1960) on 21 April 1909. Leslie was a grandson of Wiles Peacock (c. 1817–1889), conveyancer and distiller.
- Florence Muriel Holden (4 May 1890 – 1950) married William J. Shaughnessy, lived at Victor Harbor
- Dorothy Edith Holden (19 August 1893 – ) married Dr. Reginald Arthur Haste ( – ) on 10 April 1919
- William Arthur Holden (17 December 1899 – 22 December 1929) married Marjorie Reeves, daughter of elocutionist Edward Reeves.

For a more extensive chart of the family see The Holden family

== Recognition ==
A. A. Simpson CMG, president of the Royal Geographical Society of Australasia listed him among South Australia's ten greatest citizens.
