= Australian Light Aircraft Championships =

Annual flying competition in Australia

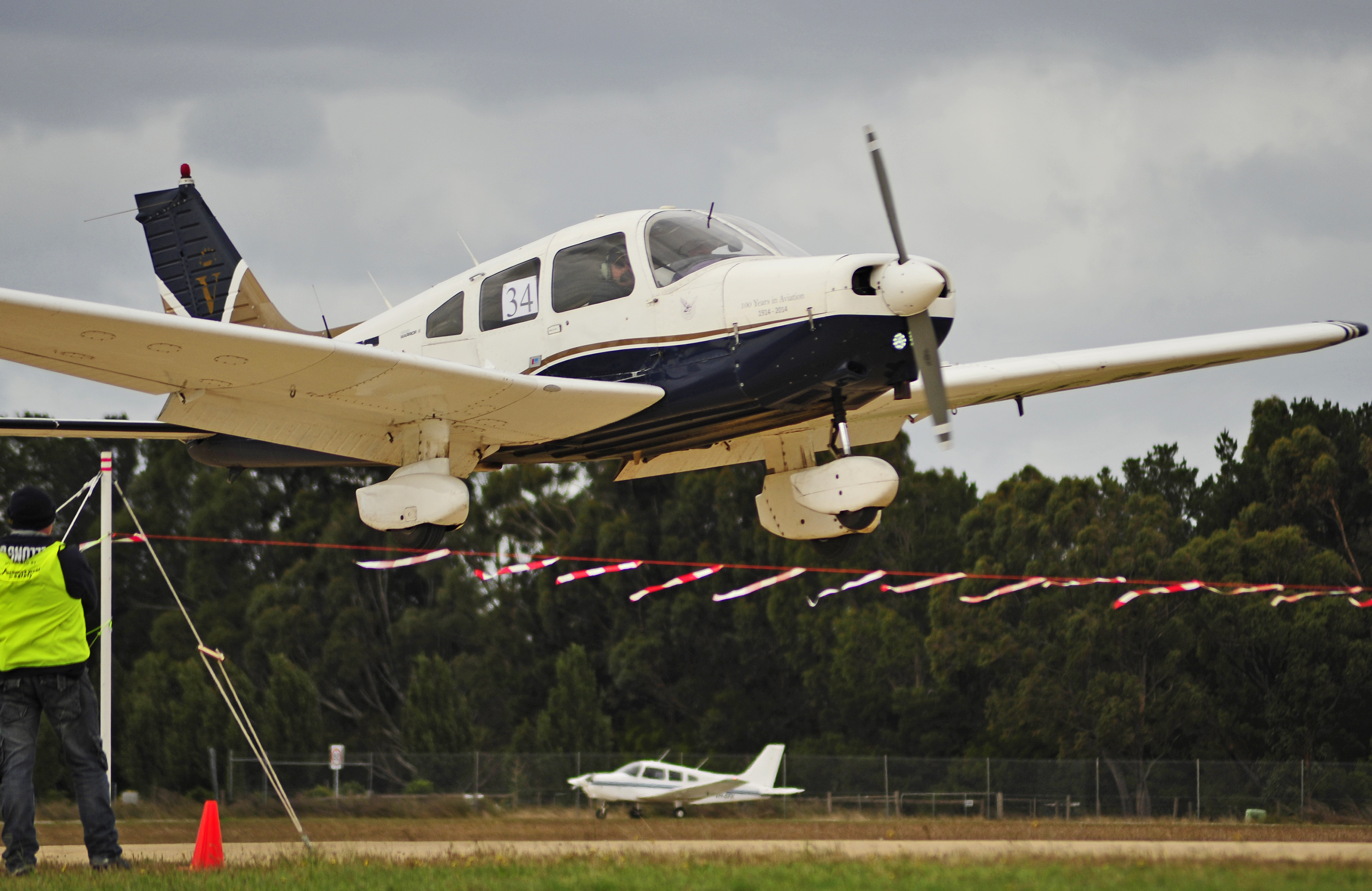
- Nickname: ALACs
- Status: Active
- Genre: Aviation competition
- Frequency: Annual
- Venue: Various host aero clubs
- Country: Australia
- Inaugurated: 1957; 69 years ago
- Organiser: Royal Federation of Aero Clubs of Australia
- Website: Official site

The Australian Light Aircraft Championships (ALACs) are an annual Australian flying competition for non-professional pilots, organised by the Royal Federation of Aero Clubs of Australia in conjunction with a host aero club. The championships have been held since 1957 and include events such as forced landing, spot landing, streamer cutting, formation flying and aerobatics. Winners of the championships have also gone on to represent Australia in "Wings International", a trans-Tasman competition held with Flying New Zealand (formerly the Royal New Zealand Aero Club).

== History ==
The Australian Light Aircraft Championships were inaugurated in 1957 and have since been conducted annually by the Royal Federation of Aero Clubs of Australia. Newspaper coverage from the 1960s shows that the championships were already a national inter-club event, with the event drawing large crowds and attracting teams from across Australia as well as participants from New Zealand.

By 1969, the championships were reported to be under the control of the Department of Civil Aviation and organised by RFACA, with 30 clubs attending. Coverage from later decades shows the championships continuing as a national competition hosted by aero clubs around Australia, including most recently by Latrobe Valley Aero Club at Traralgon in 2026.

No championships were held between 2020 and 2022 due to the COVID-19 pandemic.

== Format ==
Under the RFACA rules, the championships are open to amateur pilots holding a pilot's licence, including commercial, air transport and military licence holders provided they have not been professionally employed and remunerated in that capacity in the preceding 12 months. Competitors may represent only one organisation, may enter each event only once in a championship, and must be certified as qualified and competent for their events.

The championships consist of five events: aerobatics, forced landing, formation flying, spot landing and streamer cutting. They are contested simultaneously as individual championships, an overall championship and an RFACA team championship. Each RFACA member club or association may enter one or more teams, with team scores determined by the combined points of three nominated events.

The championships are often held as part of a broader week of aero club activities including practice days, conferences, receptions and, in alternating years the Wings International competition.

== Events ==
The championships test flying skill, accuracy and airmanship across five core disciplines: forced landing, spot landing, streamer cutting, formation flying and aerobatics. Public reporting has described the competition as being aimed at developing the skills that make better and safer light-aircraft pilots.

In the forced landing event, pilots simulate an engine failure from 2,500 feet and glide to a marked touchdown area while carrying out prescribed checks and drills. In the spot landing event, pilots fly a low-level circuit and attempt to land in a designated scoring box on the runway.

Streamer cutting requires a pilot to cut a falling streamer multiple times before it drops below a nominated height. In the formation flying event, teams of three aircraft are judged on their positioning, manoeuvres and overall precision from engine start to shutdown. Aerobatics are also contested, with pilots assessed on the accuracy and smoothness of their manoeuvres.

== Wings International ==
The Australian Light Aircraft Championships are closely linked to Wings International, a trans-Tasman flying competition between Australia and New Zealand. The event is held in conjunction with Flying New Zealand (formerly the Royal New Zealand Aero Club) and alternates between the two countries, with teams selected from the winners of their national flying competitions.

Wings International has often been held alongside the championships or as part of the same week of events. In 2001 at Taree, the Wings competition preceded the Australian championships and featured Australian and New Zealand teams competing in formation flying, aerobatics, forced landing and spot landing. In 2005, the Wings Trophy was contested in Hobart, Tasmania as part of the associated championships week, and in 2023 it was again held alongside the championships at Echuca. The most recent edition of Wings International was hosted by the South Canterbury Aero Club at Timaru in 2026, while the most recent edition of Wings hosted in Australia was in 2025 at Taree Airport by the Manning River Aero Club.

== Hosts and recent championships ==
The championships have been hosted by aero clubs across multiple Australian states and territories, reflecting their national scope.

| Year | Host Club | Airport | Location |
|---|---|---|---|
| 2026 | Latrobe Valley Aero Club | Latrobe Regional Airport, YLTV | Victoria |
| 2025 | Manning River Aero Club | Taree Airport, YTRE | New South Wales |
| 2024 | Schofields Flying Club | Cessnock Airport, YCNK | New South Wales |
| 2023 | Echuca Moama Aero Club | Echuca Airport, YECH | Victoria |
| 2022 | No competitions were held between 2020 and 2022 due to the ongoing COVID-19 pandemic. | | |
| 2021 | No competitions were held between 2020 and 2022 due to the ongoing COVID-19 pandemic. | | |
| 2020 | No competitions were held between 2020 and 2022 due to the ongoing COVID-19 pandemic. | | |
| 2019 | Royal Aero Club of Western Australia | Serpentine Airfield, YSEN | Western Australia |
| 2018 | Royal Newcastle Aero Club | Maitland Airport, YMND | New South Wales |
| 2017 | Latrobe Valley Aero Club | Latrobe Regional Airport, YLTV | Victoria |
| 2016 | Darling Downs Aero Club | Toowoomba City Airport, YTWB | Queensland |
| 2015 | Echuca Moama Aero Club | Echuca Airport, YECH | Victoria |
| 2014 | Royal Victorian Aero Club | Tooradin Airfield, YTDN | Victoria |
| 2013 | Latrobe Valley Aero Club | Latrobe Regional Airport, YLTV | Victoria |
| 2012 | Schofields Flying Club | Maitland Airport, YMND | New South Wales |
| 2011 | Royal Newcastle Aero Club | Maitland Airport, YMND | New South Wales |
| 2010 | Echuca Moama Aero Club | Echuca Airport, YECH | Victoria |
| 2009 | Royal Aero Club of Western Australia | Murrayfield Airport, YMUL | Western Australia |
| 2008 | Manning River Aero Club | Taree Airport, YTRE | New South Wales |
| 2007 | Bundaberg Aero Club | Bundaberg Airport, YBUD | Queensland |
| 2006 | Unknown / Not Yet Sourced | | |
| 2005 | Aero Club of Southern Tasmania | Cambridge Aerodrome, YCBG | Tasmania |
| 2004 | Royal Newcastle Aero Club | Maitland Airport, YMND | New South Wales |
| 2003 | Royal Victorian Aero Club | Moorabbin Airport, YMMB | Victoria |
| 2002 | Rockhampton Aero Club | Rockhampton Airport, YBRK | Queensland |
| 2001 | Manning River Aero Club | Taree Airport, YTRE | New South Wales |
| 2000 | Unknown / Not Yet Sourced | | |
| 1999 | Royal Aero Club of Western Australia | Jandakot Airport, YPJT | Western Australia |
| 1998 | Latrobe Valley Aero Club | Latrobe Regional Airport, YLTV | Victoria |
| 1997 | Unknown / Not Yet Sourced | | |
| 1996 | Unknown / Not Yet Sourced | | |
| 1995 | Unknown / Not Yet Sourced | | |
| 1994 | Unknown / Not Yet Sourced | | |
| 1993 | Unknown / Not Yet Sourced | | |
| 1992 | Unknown / Not Yet Sourced | | |
| 1991 | Unknown / Not Yet Sourced | | |
| 1990 | Unknown / Not Yet Sourced | | |
| 1989 | Royal Aero Club of Western Australia | Jandakot Airport, YPJT | Western Australia |
| 1988 | Latrobe Valley Aero Club | Latrobe Regional Airport, YLTV | Victoria |
| 1987 | Unknown / Not Yet Sourced | | |
| 1986 | Bathurst Aero Club | Bathurst Airport, YBTH | New South Wales |
| 1985 | Unknown / Not Yet Sourced | | |
| 1984 | Maroochy Aero Club* | Maroochydore Airport, YBSU | Queensland |
| 1983 | Unknown / Not Yet Sourced | | |
| 1982 | Unknown / Not Yet Sourced | | |
| 1980 | Unknown / Not Yet Sourced | | |
| 1979 | Unknown / Not Yet Sourced | | |
| 1978 | Latrobe Valley Aero Club | Latrobe Regional Airport, YLTV | Victoria |
| 1977 | Unknown / Not Yet Sourced | | |
| 1976 | Unknown / Not Yet Sourced | | |
| 1975 | Unknown / Not Yet Sourced | | |
| 1974 | Unknown / Not Yet Sourced | | |
| 1973 | Unknown / Not Yet Sourced | | |
| 1972 | Unknown / Not Yet Sourced | | |
| 1971 | Unknown / Not Yet Sourced | | |
| 1970 | Unknown / Not Yet Sourced | | |
| 1969 | Goulburn Aero Club | Goulburn Airport, YGLB | New South Wales |
| 1968 | Griffith Aero Club | Griffith Airport, YGTH | New South Wales |
| 1967 | Unknown / Not Yet Sourced | | |
| 1966 | Unknown / Not Yet Sourced | | |
| 1965 | Unknown / Not Yet Sourced | | |
| 1964 | Griffith Aero Club | Griffith Airport, YGTH | New South Wales |
| 1963 | Unknown / Not Yet Sourced | | |
| 1962 | Unknown / Not Yet Sourced | | |
| 1961 | Unknown / Not Yet Sourced | | |
| 1960 | Unknown / Not Yet Sourced | | |
| 1959 | Unknown / Not Yet Sourced | | |
| 1958 | Unknown / Not Yet Sourced | | |
| 1957 | Unknown / Not Yet Sourced | | |

*Maroochy Aero Club is now known as the Sunshine Coast Aero Club

== See also ==
- Royal Federation of Aero Clubs of Australia
