= List of aviation awards =

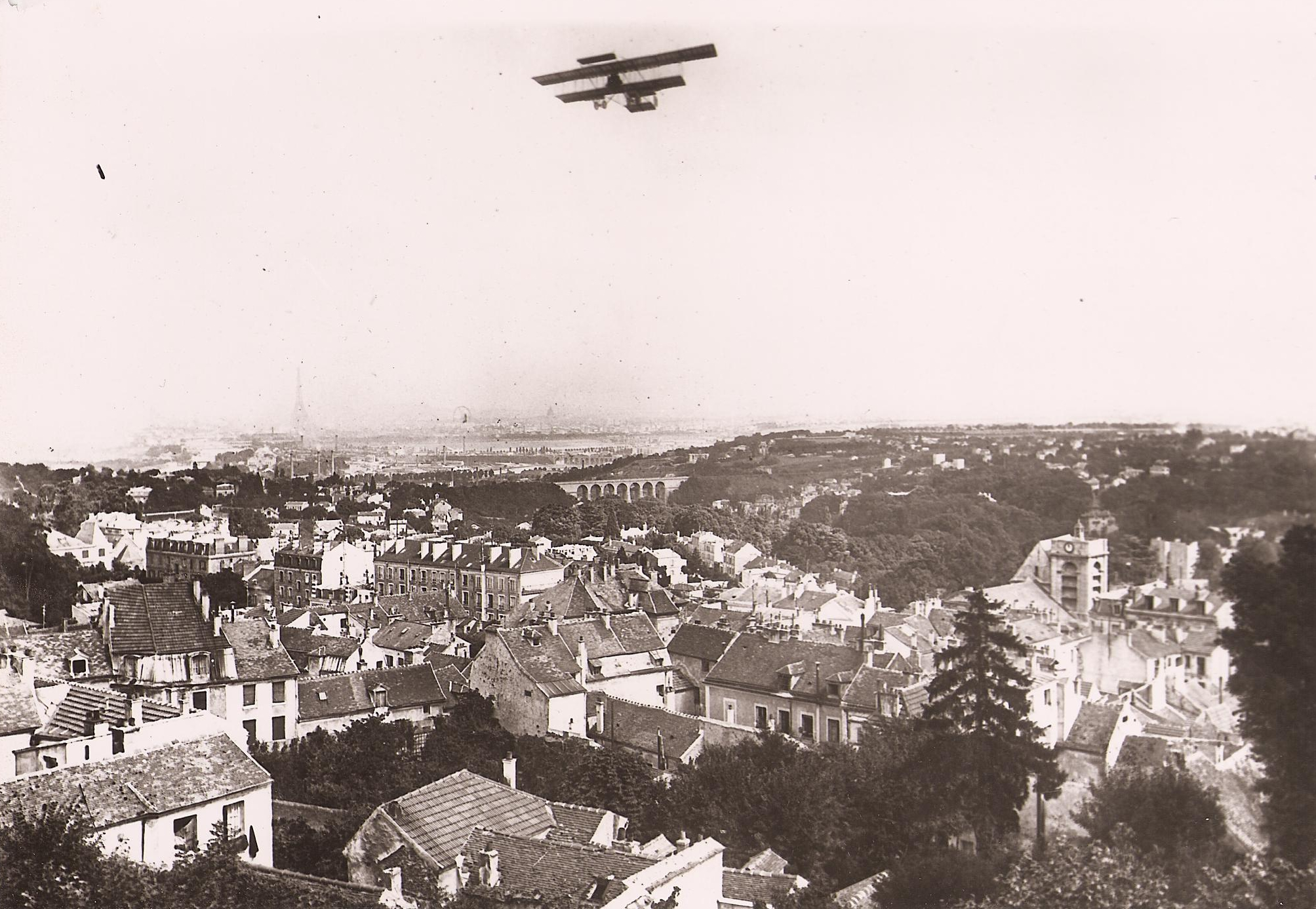
Weymann, competitor in the Michelin Grand Prix 1910, shortly after departure from Issy-les-Moulineaux

This list of aviation awards is an index to articles about notable awards given in the field of aviation. It includes a list of awards for winners of competitions or records, a list of awards by the Society of Experimental Test Pilots, various other awards and list of aviation halls of fame.

== Competitions and records ==
Awards for speed and distance of flights were popular in the early days of aviation, and some continue today.

Country	Award	Sponsor	Given for
United States	Barringer Trophy	Soaring Society of America	Longest distance soaring flight other than those flown at the US National Contest
United States	Bendix Trophy	Bendix Corporation	Transcontinental, point-to-point race
France	Coupe Deutsch de la Meurthe	Aéro-Club de France	Speed trial for powered aircraft over a distance of 200 kilometres, to be flown as an outward leg of 100 km followed by a return to the starting point
United Kingdom	Daily Mail aviation prizes	Daily Mail newspaper	Various competitions
International	De la Vaulx Medal	Fédération Aéronautique Internationale	Holders of recognized absolute world aviation records
United States	Dole Air Race	James Dole	Air race across the Pacific Ocean from northern California to the Territory of Hawaii
France	Femina Cup	Femina (French magazine)	Woman who, by sunset on 31 December each year, had made the longest flight, in time and distance, without landing
United States	Gordon Bennett Trophy	James Gordon Bennett Jr.	Fastest time over a measured distance (time trial)
United States	Hearst Transcontinental Prize	William Randolph Hearst	First aviator to fly coast to coast across the United States, in either direction, in fewer than 30 days from start to finish. The prize expired in November 1911 without a winner.
Germany	Hindenburg Cup	Paul von Hindenburg	Achievements in powered flight
United States	Igor I. Sikorsky Human Powered Helicopter Competition	American Helicopter Society (AHS) International	First human powered helicopter to meet a set of extremely challenging flight requirements
International	Lilienthal Gliding Medal	Fédération Aéronautique Internationale	Remarkable performance in gliding, or eminent services to the sport of gliding over a long period of time
International	Edison Award	Edison Awards	Honoring excellence in innovation
United States	Mackay Trophy	United States Air Force	Most meritorious flight of the year
France	Michelin Cup	Michelin	Various long-distance flight competition
United States	Orteig Prize	Raymond Orteig	First Allied aviator(s) to fly non-stop from New York City to Paris or vice versa
United States	Richard C. du Pont Memorial Trophy	Soaring Society of America	Winner of U.S. National Open Class Soaring Championship
France	Schneider Trophy	Jacques Schneider	Winner of a race for seaplanes and flying boats (see also List of Schneider Trophy aircraft)
United States	Thompson Trophy	Thompson Products	The race was 10 miles (16 km) long with 50-foot-high (15 m) pylons marking the turns, and emphasized low altitude flying and maneuverability at high speeds

== Society of Experimental Test Pilots awards ==
The Society of Experimental Test Pilots, an international organization based in the United States, offers or has offered various awards.

Award	Given for
European Flight Test Safety Award	Individuals who made significant contributions in the area of safety within flight testing
Friend of the Society of Experimental Test Pilots Award	Exceptional and notable contribution to the operation and the objectives of the Society of Experimental Test Pilots
Herman R. Salmon Award	Most outstanding technical paper published in Cockpit magazine
Iven C. Kincheloe Award	Outstanding professional accomplishment in the conduct of flight testing
James H. Doolittle Award	Outstanding accomplishment in technical management or engineering achievement in aerospace technology
Ray E. Tenhoff Award	Most outstanding technical paper presented at the annual Society of Experimental Test Pilots Symposium
Tony LeVier Flight Test Safety Award	People who have significantly contributed to the safety of flight test operations

== Other awards ==
Country	Award	Sponsor	Given for
United States	A. Leo Stevens Parachute Medal	National Air Races	Contributions to parachute design and techniques
Brazil	Order of Aeronautical Merit	Brazilian Air Force	Distinguished service and exceptional contributions to the Brazilian Air Force
United Kingdom	Aerospace Journalist of the Year Awards	World Leadership Forum	Writers and broadcasters working in the aerospace and aviation field
United Kingdom	Britannia Trophy	Royal Aero Club	Aviators accomplishing the most meritorious performance in aviation during the previous year
United States	Charles Taylor Master Mechanic Award	Federal Aviation Administration	Lifetime accomplishments of senior aviation mechanics
United States	Cheney Award	United States Air Force	Act of valor, extreme fortitude or self-sacrifice in a humanitarian interest, performed in connection with aircraft, but not necessarily of a military nature
United States	Chief of Naval Operations Aviation Safety Award	United States Navy	Safety based on aircraft flight mishap rates, ground mishaps, currency of safety programs, and flight exposure, etc.
United States	Collier Trophy	National Aeronautic Association	Greatest achievement in aeronautics or astronautics in America, with respect to improving the performance, efficiency, and safety of air or space vehicles
United States	Dale Wright Award	National Air Traffic Controllers Association	Professional and exceptional career service to NATCA and the National Airspace System
International	Edward Warner Award	International Civil Aviation Organization	Aviation pioneers or organizations that have contributed to civil aviation
United States	Endeavor Award	Angel Flight West, California Science Center	Volunteer pilots and organizations that coordinate their gifts of flight to serve those in need
International	FAI Gold Air Medal	Fédération Aéronautique Internationale	Great contributions to the development of aeronautics by their activities, work, achievements, initiative or devotion to the cause of aviation
United States	Paul E. Garber Award	Civil Air Patrol	CAP members who have dedicated themselves to leadership and personal development in the CAP
United States	General Aviation Awards Program	Federal Aviation Administration	Individual general aviation professionals on the local, regional, and national levels for their contributions to aviation, education, and flight safety
United States	Daniel Guggenheim Medal	American Society of Mechanical Engineers etc.	Persons who make notable achievements in the advancement of aeronautics
United States	Harmon Trophy	National Aeronautic Association	World's outstanding aviator, aviatrix, and aeronaut (balloon or dirigible)
United States	Howard Hughes Memorial Award	Aero Club of Southern California	Aerospace leader whose accomplishments over a long career have contributed significantly to the advancement of aviation or space technology
United States	John J. Montgomery Award	National Society of Aerospace Professionals, San Diego Air & Space Museum	Aerospace achievement
United States	L. Welch Pogue Award for Lifetime Achievement in Aviation	Aviation Week & Space Technology	Visionary and preeminent leader of contemporary aviation
United States	Langley Gold Medal	Smithsonian Institution	Outstanding contributions to the sciences of aeronautics and astronautics
United States	Living Legends of Aviation	Kiddie Hawk Air Academy	Significant contributions to aviation
Germany	Ludwig Prandtl Ring	Deutsche Gesellschaft für Luft- und Raumfahrt	Outstanding contribution in the field of aerospace engineering
United States	Maintenance Trophy	Lockheed Martin	Teams are examined on their flight line operations, the quality of their support elements, engineering skills and a team interview
United States	Michael A. Dornheim Award	National Press Club	Presented in honor of the late Michael A. Dornheim, a longtime reporter and editor at Aviation Week & Space Technology magazine. The recipient must be a working journalist writing about aerospace, defense, the airline industry, or aerospace science and engineering. The winner gets a $1,000 prize.
United States	Octave Chanute Award	American Institute of Aeronautics and Astronautics	Pilot(s) or test personnel that contributed to the advancement of the art, science, or technology of aeronautics
United States	Onizuka Prop Wash Award	U.S. Air Force Test Pilot School	Student at the USAF TPS who contributed most to class spirit and morale
Australia	Oswald Watt Gold Medal	Royal Federation of Aero Clubs of Australia	A most brilliant performance in the air or the most notable contribution to aviation by an Australian or in Australia
United States	Pilot Proficiency Award Program	Federal Aviation Administration	General aviation pilots knowledge and proficiency (safety)
International	Polaris Award	International Federation of Air Line Pilots' Associations	Airline crews in recognition for acts of exceptional airmanship, heroic action or a combination of these two attributes
International	Salute to Excellence	Helicopter Association International	Outstanding achievements in the international helicopter community
United Kingdom	Segrave Trophy	Royal Automobile Club	Outstanding Skill, Courage and Initiative on Land, Water and in the Airfirst person to hold both the land and water speed records simultaneously.
Americas	SICOFAA Legion of Merit Medal	System of Cooperation Among the American Air Forces	Military members or civilians who have contributed to and promoted the interests of SICOFAA
United States and Canada	Superior Airmanship Award	Air Line Pilots Association, International	Superior airmanship (safety)
United States	Tailhooker of the Year Award	Tailhook Association	Yearly award given to an individual who has made the most significant contribution to U.S. carrier aviation. Reference to the tailhook of an aircraft carrier based airplane.
United States	Tony Jannus Award	Tony Jannus Distinguished Aviation Society	Individual achievement in scheduled commercial aviation by airline executives, inventors and manufacturers, and government leaders
United States	William J. Kossler Award	Vertical Flight Society	Greatest achievement in practical application or operation of rotary wing aircraft
United States	Wright Brothers Medal	SAE International	Notable contributions in the engineering, design, development, or operation of air and space vehicles
United States	Wright Brothers Memorial Trophy	National Aeronautic Association	Significant public service of enduring value to aviation in the United States

== North American aviation halls of fame ==
=== Geographic ===
State/province	Hall of fame	Sponsor / location
Alabama	Alabama Aviation Hall of Fame	Southern Museum of Flight
Alaska	Alaska Aviation Hall of Fame	Alaska Aviation Museum
Alberta, Canada	Canada's Aviation Hall of Fame	Reynolds-Alberta Museum
Arkansas	Arkansas Aviation Hall of Fame	Butler Center for Arkansas Studies/Arkansas Aviation Historical Society
Arizona	Arizona Aviation Hall of Fame	Pima Air & Space Museum
California	California Aviation Hall of Fame	Museum of Flying
Colorado	Colorado Aviation Hall of Fame	Colorado Aviation Historical Society
Delaware	Delaware Aviation Hall of Fame	Friends of Bellanca Airfield
Florida	Florida Aviation Hall of Fame	Florida Air Museum
Georgia	Georgia Aviation Hall of Fame	Museum of Aviation
Idaho	Idaho Aviation Hall of Fame	Boise Airport/Idaho Aviation Association
Illinois	Illinois Aviation Hall of Fame	Illinois Aviation Hall of Fame
Indiana	Indiana Aviation Hall of Fame	Indiana Aviation Hall of Fame
Iowa	Iowa Aviation Hall of Fame	Iowa Aviation Museum
Kansas	Kansas Aviation Hall of Fame	Kansas Aviation Museum
Kentucky	Kentucky Aviation Hall of Fame	Aviation Museum of Kentucky
Louisiana	Louisiana Aviation Hall of Fame	Chennault Aviation and Military Museum
Michigan	Michigan Aviation Hall of Fame	Air Zoo
Minnesota	Minnesota Aviation Hall of Fame	Wings of the North Air Museum
Mississippi	Mississippi Aviation Hall of Fame	Mississippi Aviation Heritage Museum
Missouri	Missouri Aviation Hall of Fame	Missouri Aviation Historical Society
Nebraska	Nebraska Aviation Hall of Fame	Nebraska Aviation Council
New Jersey	Aviation Hall of Fame and Museum of New Jersey	Aviation Hall of Fame and Museum of New Jersey
New York	Empire State Aviation Hall of Fame	Empire State Aerosciences Museum
North Carolina	North Carolina Aviation Hall of Fame	North Carolina Aviation Museum
North Dakota	North Dakota Aviation Hall of Fame	North Dakota Aeronautics Commission
Ohio	National Aviation Hall of Fame	National Aviation Hall of Fame
Ohio	Ohio Air & Space Hall of Fame and Learning Center	Ohio Air & Space Hall of Fame and Learning Center
Oklahoma	Oklahoma Aviation and Space Hall of Fame	Science Museum Oklahoma
Oregon	Oregon Aviation Hall of Fame	Oregon Aviation Historical Society & Museum
South Carolina	South Carolina Aviation Hall of Fame	Jim Hamilton–L.B. Owens Airport/South Carolina Aviation Association
South Dakota	South Dakota Aviation Hall of Fame	South Dakota Air and Space Museum
Rhode Island	Rhode Island Aviation Hall of Fame	Rhode Island Aviation Hall of Fame
Tennessee	Tennessee Aviation Hall of Fame	Tennessee Museum of Aviation
Texas	Texas Aviation Hall of Fame	Lone Star Flight Museum
Utah	Utah Aviation Hall of Fame	Hill Aerospace Museum
Virginia	Virginia Aviation Hall of Fame	Shannon Air Museum/Virginia Aeronautical Historical Society
West Virginia	West Virginia Aviation Hall of Fame	North Central West Virginia Airport/West Virginia Airport Managers Association
Wisconsin	Wisconsin Aviation Hall of Fame	Kelch Aviation Museum
Wyoming	Wyoming Aviation Hall of Fame	University of Wyoming/Wyoming Aeronautics Commission

=== Subject ===
State/province	Hall of fame	Sponsor / location
Alabama	Army Aviation Hall of Fame	United States Army Aviation Museum
California	Aerospace Walk of Honor	City of Lancaster, California
Florida	Naval Aviation Hall of Honor	National Naval Aviation Museum
Florida	United States Astronaut Hall of Fame	Kennedy Space Center Visitor Complex
Indiana	AMA Model Aviation Hall of Fame	Academy of Model Aeronautics
Mississippi	National Agricultural Aviation Hall of Fame	Mississippi Agriculture and Forestry Museum
New York	Soaring Hall of Fame	National Soaring Museum
Ohio	Women in Aviation International Pioneer Hall of Fame	Women in Aviation International
Texas	American Combat Airman Hall of Fame	American Airpower Heritage Museum
Wisconsin	EAA Homebuilders Hall of Fame	EAA Aviation Museum
Wisconsin	EAA Sport Aviation Hall of Fame	EAA Aviation Museum
Wisconsin	EAA Ultralights Hall of Fame	EAA Aviation Museum
Wisconsin	International Aerobatic Club Hall of Fame	EAA Aviation Museum
Wisconsin	Vintage Aircraft Association Hall of Fame	EAA Aviation Museum
Wisconsin	Warbirds of America Hall of Fame	EAA Aviation Museum

== See also ==
- Lists of awards
- Lists of science and technology awards
