= FAI Gold Air Medal =

The FAI Gold Air Medal was established in 1924 by the Fédération Aéronautique Internationale and was first awarded in 1925. This award and the Paul Tissander Diploma are the FAI's two highest awards. It is reserved for those who have contributed greatly to the development of aeronautics by their activities, work, achievements, initiative or devotion to the cause of aviation.

== Winners ==
Date	Name	Country
1925	Francesco de Pinedo	Italy
1926	Alan Cobham	United Kingdom
1927	Charles Lindbergh	USA
1928	Bert Hinkler	Australia
1929	Dieudonné Costes	France
1930	Italo Balbo	Italy
1931	Hugo Eckener	Germany
1932	Juan de la Cierva	Spain
1933	Wiley Post	USA
1934	C. W. A. Scott	United Kingdom
1935	not awarded	
1936	Jean Mermoz	France
1937	Jean Batten	United Kingdom
1938	not awarded	
1939	not awarded	
1940	not awarded	
1941	not awarded	
1942	not awarded	
1943	not awarded	
1944	not awarded	
1945	not awarded	
1946	Igor Sikorsky	USA
1947	Chuck Yeager	USA
1948	not awarded	
1949	not awarded	
1950	Frank Whittle	United Kingdom
1951	Edward P. Warner	USA
1952	not awarded	
1953	Jacqueline Cochran	USA
1954	James Doolittle	USA
1955	Maurice Hurel	France
1956	Peter Twiss	United Kingdom
1957	David G. Simons	USA
1958	Andrey Nikolaevich Tupolev	USSR
1959	Pierre Satre	France
1960	Yuri Gagarin	USSR
1961	Geoffrey De Havilland	United Kingdom
1962	not awarded	
1963	Jacqueline Auriol	France
1964	Vladimir Kokkinaki	USSR
1965	Robert L. Stephens	USA
1966	Alexander Sergeyevich Yakovlev	USSR
1967	Joseph A. Walker	USA
1968	Sergey Ilyushin	USSR
1969	José Luis Aresti Aguirre	Spain
1970	Dick Merrill	USA
1971	Elgen Long	USA
1972	Marina Popovich	USSR
1973	Don Anderson	Australia
1974	Aleksandr Vasilyevich Fedotov	USSR
1975	Curtis Pitts	USA
1976	Sholto Hamilton Georgeson	New Zealand
1977	Michael Murphy (aviator)	USA
1978	Hans Werner Grosse	Federal Republic of Germany
1979	Paul Maccready	USA
1980	Ann Welch	United Kingdom
1981	Jean-Pierre Freiburghaus	Switzerland
1982	Paul Poberezny	USA
1983	Jan Mikula (engineer)	Czechoslovakia
1984	J. R. D. Tata	India
1985	Ralph Paul Alex	USA
1986	Semyon Kharlamov	USSR
1987	Henry Kremer	United Kingdom
1988	August Christov Kabaktchiev	Bulgaria
1989	George Alfred "Peter" Lloyd	Australia
1990	Sabiha Gökcen	Turkey
1991	Kyung O Kim	South Korea
1992	Cenek Kepak	Slovakia
1993	Olavi Rautio	Finland
1994	Scott Crossfield	USA
1995	Hanspeter Hirzel	Switzerland
1996	Alexander Pimenoff	Finland
1997	Attila Taçoy	Turkey
1998	not awarded	
1999	Bertrand Piccard	Switzerland
1999	Brian Jones	United Kingdom
2000	Eilif Ness	Cyprus
2001	not awarded	
2002	Steve Fossett	USA
2003	not awarded	
2004	Jon Johanson	Australia
2005	Richard Meredith-Hardy	United Kingdom
2006	Victor Smolin	Russia
2007	Eugene Cernan	USA
2008	Jiří Kobrle	Czech Republic
2009	Barron Hilton	USA
2010	David Hempleman-Adams	United Kingdom
2011	John Dickenson (aviator)	Australia
2012	Mikhail Mamistov	Russia
2014	William Moyes	Australia
2015	Hans Åkerstedt	Sweden
2016	not awarded	
2017	not awarded	
2018	not awarded	
2019	Domina Jalbert	USA
2020	Hermann Trimmel	Austria
2021	not awarded	
2022	not awarded	
2023	not awarded	
2024	Sebastian Kawa	Poland

== See also ==
- List of aviation awards
