= Oswald Watt Gold Medal =

Australia's highest aviation award

The Oswald Watt Gold Medal
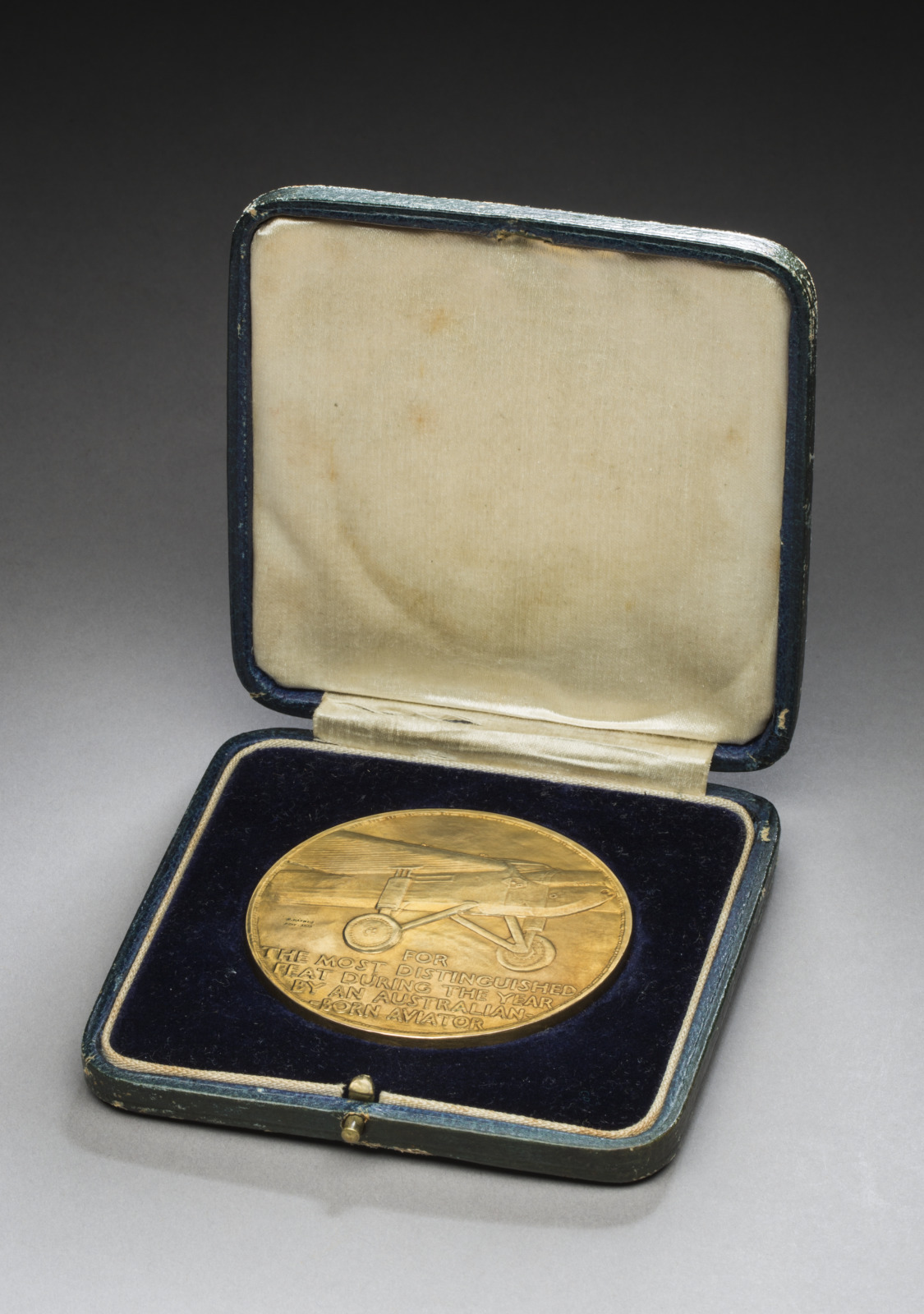
- Photograph of the Oswald Watt Gold Medal as presented to Edgar Percival in 1936.
- Awarded for: A most brilliant performance in the air or the most notable contribution to aviation by an Australian or in Australia.
- Country: Australia
- Presented by: Royal Federation of Aero Clubs of Australia (RFACA)
- First award: 1921

Highlights
- Most wins: Bert Hinkler (1927, 1928, 1931, 1932); Sir Charles Kingsford Smith (1929, 1930, 1933, 1934)
- Website: Official site

The Oswald Watt Gold Medal is an Australian aviation award presented by the Royal Federation of Aero Clubs of Australia (RFACA), and has been described as Australia's highest aviation award.

It is awarded for "a most brilliant performance in the air or the most notable contribution to aviation by an Australian or in Australia". Established in 1921 following the death of Oswald Watt, the medal has recognised both notable flights and broader contributions to Australian aviation, and is awarded on merit rather than on an annual basis.

== Background ==
The medal is named after Lieutenant Colonel Walter Oswald Watt (1878–1921), an early Australian military aviator and a leading figure in the Australian aero club movement. Watt became the first Australian military officer to gain a pilot's licence in 1911 and later served with distinction in the French and Australian flying services during the First World War. After returning to Australia, he became foundation president of the New South Wales Section of the Australian Aero Club in 1919 and played an important role in the development of civil aviation regulation in Australia.

Following Watt's death in 1921, he left £500 in his will to the Australian Aero Club to fund a gold medal to be presented each year to the aviator who achieves "the most brilliant performance in the air" by an Australian or in Australia.

The first awards were approved retrospectively in 1927, after the bequest and administration of the medal had been settled. The medal has since been administered by the national aero club federation under its successive names, from the Australian Aero Club Federal Council to the Royal Federation of Aero Clubs of Australia.

== List of recipients ==
The list of recipients includes many of the best-known names in Australian aviation, including Bert Hinkler, Charles Kingsford Smith, Hudson Fysh, and Dick Smith.

Year	Image	Recipient	Citation	Ref(s)
1921		Francis Stewart Briggs	Pioneer of long-distance flights in C. J. De Garis's Airco DH.4, including the first east-to-west aerial crossing of Australia from Melbourne to Perth in December 1920 and a one-day Brisbane to Melbourne flight in January 1921.	
1922		Harry Turner Shaw	Completed the first civilian Melbourne to Sydney flight in May 1922 in a 50 hp Maurice Farman Sport; delayed by engine trouble at Moss Vale, he reached Sydney on the next hop and later returned to Melbourne via Tumut.	
1923	No award			
1924		Flt Lt Ivor McIntyre	Pilot of a Royal Australian Air Force (RAAF) Fairey IIID configured as a floatplane in the first circumnavigation of Australia by air; departing from RAAF Point Cook, Victoria on 6 April 1924 and landing on St. Kilda Beach 44 days later	
1925		E. J. Jones	Flew from Melbourne to Normanton in north-west Queensland and back to Melbourne	
1926		Flt Lt Ivor McIntyre	Second award; pilot on a flight with Wing Commander (later Air Marshal) Richard Williams from RAAF Point Cook near Melbourne to the Solomon Islands and return	
1927		Bert Hinkler	Flew 1,200 miles non stop from Croydon (London, United Kingdom) to Riga, Latvia in 10 hours and 45 minutes. He piloted a prototype Avro Avian 581A (registration G-EBOV).	
1928		Bert Hinkler	Second award; piloted the first non stop solo flight between England and Australia, departing London on 7 February 1928 and arriving in Darwin on 22 February; and back in his home town of Bundaberg a few days later on 27 February. The flight took 128 flying hours using the same Avro Avian 581A (registration G-EBOV) as his earlier non-stop London to Latvia.	
1929		Sir Charles Kingsford Smith	Flew his Fokker F.VIIb (Southern Cross, VH-USU) alongside Charles Ulm, Harold Litchfield and Tom McWilliams from Derby, Western Australia to Croydon, London in the record-breaking time of 12 days, 18 hours.	
1930		Sir Charles Kingsford Smith	Second award; in June 1930 he piloted the Southern Cross across the Atlantic Ocean from Ireland to Newfoundland in 31½ hours. Returning to England, he then took delivery of an Avro Avian biplane (Southern Cross Junior) and flew a record-breaking solo flight from England to Darwin beating Hinkler's time by 5 ½ days.	
1931		Bert Hinkler	Third award; flew a de Havilland Puss Moth from Canada via New York, Jamaica, British Guiana and Brazil across the South Atlantic to West Africa, becoming the first person to fly solo across the South Atlantic.	
1932		Bert Hinkler	Fourth award; further recognition for his 1931 Puss Moth expedition, particularly the solo South Atlantic crossing for which he also received the Segrave Trophy and the Johnston Memorial Silver Plaque in 1932.	
1933		Sir Charles Kingsford Smith	Third award; flew the Percival Gull ''Miss Southern Cross'' from Lympne (Kent, United Kingdom) to Wyndham, Western Australia in 7 days 4 hours 44 minutes, setting a new England–Australia record of 7 days, 4 hrs, 44 min.	
1934		Sir Charles Kingsford Smith	Fourth award; with Patrick Gordon Taylor as navigator, flew the Lockheed Altair ''Lady Southern Cross'' from Archerfield Airport in Brisbane to the United States via Fiji and Hawaii, completing the first eastward trans-Pacific flight.	
1935		Harry Frank Broadbent	Awarded for his 1935 record flights: a round-Australia circuit in a de Havilland Puss Moth in 3 days, 9 hours, 54 minutes, and a solo England to Australia record in a Percival Gull Six in 6 days, 21 hours, 19 minutes.	
1936		Edgar Percival	Awarded for flying a Percival Gull from Gravesend (Kent, United Kingdom) to Oran, North Africa, and back in one day, and for speed-racing achievements including the King's Cup air race and Folkestone Speed Trophy.	
1937		Dr. Clyde Fenton	Awarded for meritorious work as the Northern Territory's flying doctor in 1937, piloting his own aircraft on emergency medical and rescue flights to remote stations and settlements across the Territory.	
1938		Don Bennett	Awarded for piloting the Short S.20 Mercury flying-boat on the first commercial non-stop east-to-west transatlantic flight, from Foynes, Ireland, to Boucherville near Montreal, in July 1938.	
1939	No award			
1940	No award			
1941	No award			
1942	No award			
1943	No award			
1944	No award			
1945	No award			
1946		Don Bennett	Second award; for his survey flight for British South American Airways (BSAA), flying the Avro Lancastrian Star Land on a route linking London with the Caribbean and Central America as part of the development of postwar South American services.	
1947		Harold Brownlow Martin	Awarded for setting a London to Cape Town speed record on 1 May 1947 in a de Havilland Mosquito, flying with Squadron Leader Edward Sismore in 21 hours 31 minutes.	
1948	No award			
1949	No award			
1950		Martin Warner	Awarded for his British Empire altitude record in a Slingsby T.25 Gull 4 Glider on December 30, 1950, during which an altitude maximum of 23,500 ft was attained after flying into a cloud and catching an updraft.	
1951		Patrick Gordon Taylor	Awarded for his 1951 trans-Pacific flight from Australia to Chile in the Consolidated PBY Catalina Frigate Bird II, making the first aerial crossing of the South Pacific between Australia and South America via Tahiti and Easter Island.	
1952		Sqn Ldr Peter Gordon Fisher	Awarded for piloting an English Electric Canberra jet bomber from England to Melbourne in 23 hours 5 minutes on 12 May 1952, the first flight between the two countries in under 24 hours, and for setting a Darwin to Laverton record of 3 hours 55 minutes.	
1953		Wing Commander Derek "Jell" Cuming	Awarded for his role in the 1953 London to Christchurch air race as commander of the RAAF's No. 1 Long Range Flight, and for his wider contribution to aviation as a leading RAAF test pilot.	
1954		Mervyn Waghorn	Awarded for his 303-mile gliding flight from Narromine to Wangaratta in 1954; Waghorn was a prominent Australian glider pilot and an early president of the Gliding Federation of Australia.	
1955	No award			
1956	No award			
1957		Sir Donald Anderson	Director General of the Department of Civil Aviation, for the most notable contribution to aviation and in particular for his performance on behalf of Australia and Qantas in enabling this country to become an all round the world operator.	
1958		Squadron Leader D. W. Leckie	Awarded for leading the RAAF Antarctic Flight at Mawson Station in 1956, flying Auster Mk 6 aircraft in support of Australia's Antarctic expedition, aerial surveying and mapping work in the Prince Charles Mountains.	
1959		Alan Edward Chadwick	For outstanding work and devotion to duty with the Flying Medical Service of the Bush Church Aid Society. Notable for his role as Chief Pilot which saw him based at Ceduna, South Australia and included emergency medical services across the Nullarbor Plain and outback communities.	
1960		Brigadier Guy N. Moore	For a most notable contribution by an Australian to the advancement of civil aviation. Notable for his career associated with aviation administration and public advocacy for civil aviation.	
1961	No award			
1962		Henry Millicer	For a most notable contribution to aviation in Australia. Notable for his contributions to the development of the Victa Airtourer and the Victa Aircruiser.	
1963	No award			
1964		Edward Connellan	For a most notable contribution to aviation in Australia. Notable for founding Connellan Airways in 1939 and the development of air mail, passenger and medical services across the Northern Territory and central Australia.	
1965	No award			
1966		Harry Schneider	For a most notable contribution to aviation in Australia. Notable for supporting the development of the sport of gliding in Australia and establishing a glider manufacturing industry in South Australia.	
1967		Sir Wilmot Hudson Fysh	For a most notable contribution to aviation in Australia. Notable for co-founding Qantas Airways in 1920 alongside Paul McGinness and Sir Fergus McMaster.	
1968	No award			
1969		George Alfred (Peter) Lloyd	For a most notable contribution to aviation in Australia during his Presidency of the Royal Federation of Aero Clubs of Australia from 1958 to 1970 and in particular as Chairman of the 1969 BP England to Australia Commemorative Air Race.	
1970	No award			
1971	No award			
1972	No award			
1973		Sir Norman Brearley	For a most notable contribution to aviation in Australia. Notable for founding West Australian Airways in 1921 and pioneering interstate air mail routes across Western Australia.	
1974		Sir Lawrence Wackett	For a most notable contribution to aviation in Australia. Notable for his work as an aircraft designer, manufacturer and industrial leader with the Commonwealth Aircraft Corporation and the growth of Australia's aircraft manufacturing industry.	
1975		Sir Reginald "Reg" Ansett	For a most notable contribution to aviation in Australia. Notable for founding Ansett Australia in 1935.	
1976		Clive Canning	For the most brilliant performance in flying his own amateur constructed Thorp T-18 aircraft from Melbourne to London and return in the course of which he established a number of FAI World Class Records. Notable for being the first Australia-England flight in a homebuilt aircraft	
1977		Horrie Miller	For a most notable contribution to the development of aviation in Australia. Notable for co-founding MacRobertson Miller Airlines in 1919.	
1978	No award			
1979		Bill Moyes	For a most notable contribution to the development of Hang Gliding in Australia and throughout the world.	
1980	No award			
1981	No award			
1982	No award			
1983		Dick Smith	For a most notable contribution to the development of aviation in Australia and throughout the world in his successful Around the World flight in a helicopter. Notable for becoming the first person to fly solo around the world in a rotary-wing aircraft in a Bell JetRanger 206B (S/N 3653; VH-DIK).	
1984	No award			
1985	No award			
1986	No award			
1987	No award			
1988		Ian Honnery	For the outstanding contribution he made to the development of aviation in Australia, particularly in his dedicated organisation of the 1988 Bicentennial Air Show.	
1989	No award			
1990	No award			
1991	No award			
1992		Chris Dewhirst	For the most notable contribution to aviation in 1991 by successfully piloting a hot air balloon over Mt Everest. This was the first balloon flight of any kind over Mt Everest.	
1993		George "Scotty" Allan	For a most notable contribution to aviation in Australia.	
1994	No award			
1995		Jon Johanson	For the most brilliant performance in the air by an Australian in 1995. Notable for flying around the world in a Van's RV-4 two seat homebuilt aircraft that he had built himself, leaving Adelaide's Parafield Airport on 26 June 1995 and arriving back at Parafield on 4 September 1995.	
1996		Shirley Adkins	For a most noteworthy contribution to aviation in Australia. Notable being the first woman to win the Oswald Watt Gold Medal and previously was a trailblazer as the first female president of the Royal Aero Club of Western Australia and the Royal Federation of Aero Clubs of Australia.	
1997		Bernard (Bernie) Sarroff	For the most notable contribution to aviation in Australia by organising flying safaris overseas and in Australia	
1998		Dr Andy Thomas	For a most notable contribution to Aviation by an Australian. Notable as an Australian-born NASA astronaut who spent 141 days aboard the Mir space station in 1998.	
1999		Dr Paul Scully-Power	For a most notable contribution to Aviation by an Australian. Notable being Australia's first astronaut, his work in oceanography and remote sensing from space as well as his 1984 Space Shuttle mission STS-41-G.	
2000	No award			
2001	No award			
2002	No award			
2003	No award			
2004	No award			
2005	No award			
2006	No award			
2007	No award			
2008	No award			
2009	No award			
2010	No award			
2011		Squadron Leader Paul Simmons	For a most notable contribution to Aviation by an Australian for his unique combination of professional mastery as an operational fighter pilot, dedication to the mentoring and instruction of junior aircrew, commitment to the preservation of aviation heritage as the Australian CA-27 Sabre pilot and establishment of the LIFT (Learning, Inspiration, Friendship and Trust) youth charity.	
2012		John Wallace Dickenson	For a most notable contribution to Aviation by an Australian for his invention of the modern Hang Glider and making improvements in flight safety.	
2013		Marj Davis Gillespie	For a most notable contribution to Aviation by an Australian for her voluntary contribution of sixteen years to the Royal Federation of Aero Clubs of Australia, the Flying Training Industry and General Aviation.	
2014		Air Chief Marshal Sir Angus Houston	For leadership with the Joint Agency Coordination Centre coordinating the Australian Government's support for the search into missing Malaysia Airlines Flight MH370 and his role as Special Envoy to Ukraine to lead Australia's efforts on the ground in Ukraine to help recover, identify and repatriate Australians killed in the Malaysia Airlines Flight MH17 crash and to assist relatives of Australian victims, and ensure that a proper investigation of the crash was Initiated in accordance with international standards.	
2015	No award			
2016		George Alfred (Peter) Lloyd	Second award; for continued and valuable service to the Aviation Industry and in particular, the safety of aviation.	
2017	No award			
2018	No award			
2019	No award			
2020	No award			
2021	No award			
2022	No award			
2023	No award			
2024	No award			
2025	No award			

== See also ==
- Oswald Watt
- Royal Federation of Aero Clubs of Australia
- List of aviation awards
