= Gordon Taylor (aviator) =

Australian aviator and author

Sir Gordon Taylor
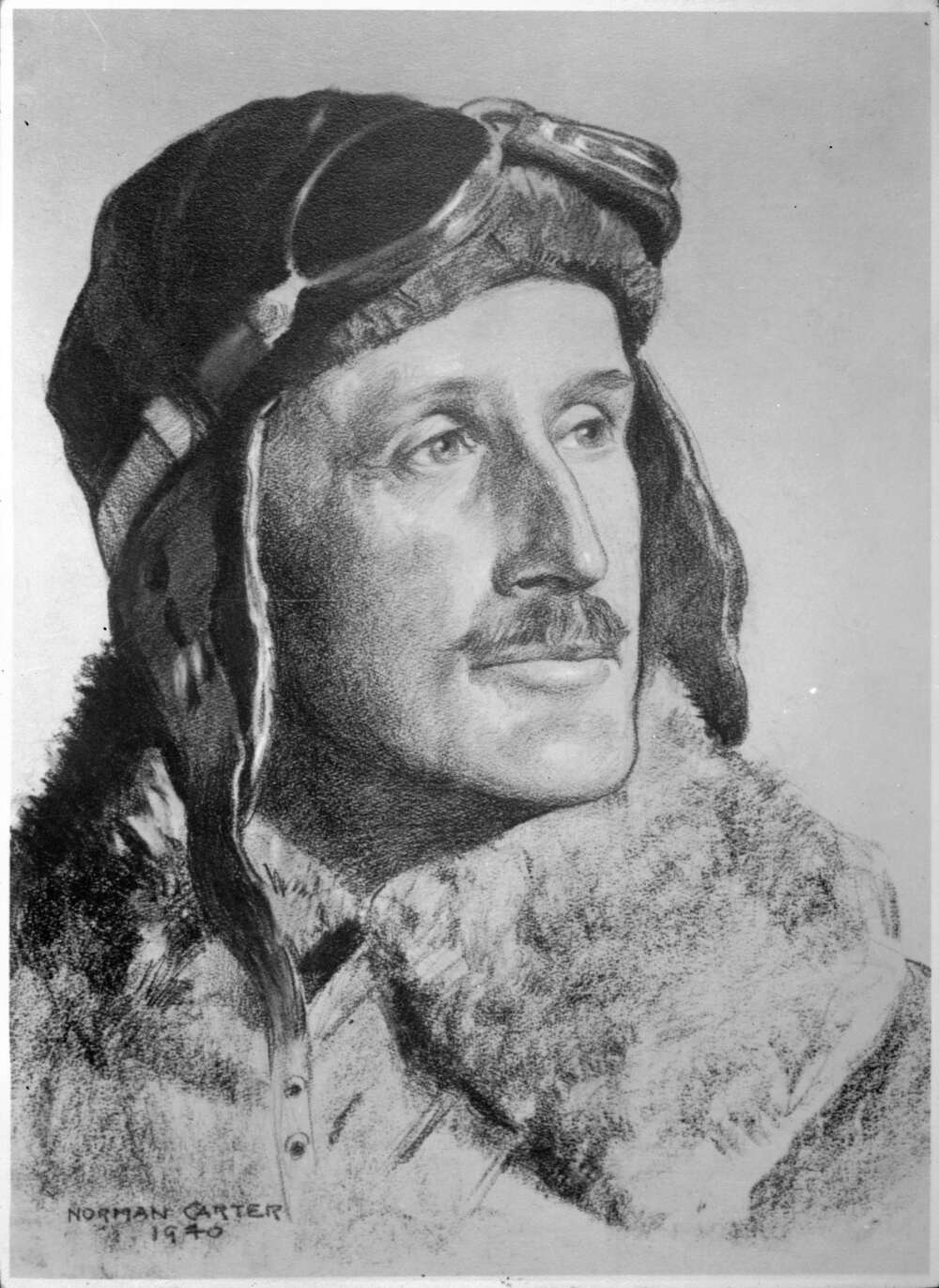
- Portrait of Sir Patrick Gordon Taylor c.1940
- Born: 21 October 1896; Mosman, New South Wales
- Died: 15 December 1966 (aged 70); Honolulu, Hawaii
- Military career
- Allegiance: United Kingdom; Australia
- Branch: Royal Flying Corps; Royal Australian Air Force
- Service years: 1916–19; 1943–44
- Rank: Squadron leader
- Conflicts: First World War; Second World War
- Awards: George Cross; Knight Bachelor; Military Cross

Sir Patrick Gordon Taylor, GC, MC (21 October 1896 – 15 December 1966), commonly known as Bill Taylor, was an Australian aviator and author. He was born in Mosman, Sydney, and died in Honolulu.

Taylor attended The Armidale School in northern New South Wales. At the beginning of the First World War he applied to join the Australian Flying Corps but was rejected. He subsequently went to Britain and was commissioned into the Royal Flying Corps in 1916, joining No. 66 Squadron, based at RAF Filton. He was awarded the Military Cross in 1917 and promoted to captain, also serving with Nos. 94 and 88 Squadrons.

Following the war, he returned to Australia and embarked on a career in civil aviation, working as a private pilot for de Havilland Aircraft Company in the 1920s. He flew as a captain with Australian National Airways 1930–31. He also completed an engineering course and studied aerial navigation.

He served as a second pilot or navigator on pioneering flights with Charles Kingsford Smith, Charles Ulm and others. During the 1935 Australia-New Zealand airmail flight with Charles Kingsford Smith, the starboard engine failed and the crew decided to return to Sydney, where the aircraft was buffeted by strong winds. It was decided that fuel and cargo must be jettisoned. During these conditions, Taylor made six journeys outside the cabin of the Southern Cross, climbing along the under-wing strut to drain the oil from the useless motor and transfer this to the overheating port motor. Taylor's actions, with the addition of Smith's flying skills, resulted in the plane making its way back to land safely. Taylor was later awarded the Empire Gallantry Medal for his actions, which was later exchanged for the George Cross.

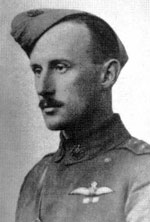
Captain Gordon Taylor c.1917

In 1943 he was commissioned flying officer in the Royal Australian Air Force, transferring to the Royal Air Force in 1944. During the Second World War, Captain Taylor served as a ferry pilot for the Air Transport Auxiliary. Taylor was knighted in 1954.

In 1946 he played himself in the 1946 film Smithy.

== Pioneering flights ==
- 1933 – second pilot and navigator with Charles Kingsford Smith's first commercial flight across the Tasman Sea from Australia to New Zealand and back.
- 1933 – navigator with Charles Ulm – Australia-England-Australia.
- 1934 – with Charles Kingsford Smith – first Australia-USA flight, via Fiji and Hawaiʻi.
- 1935 – navigator with Charles Kingsford Smith – Australia-New Zealand, flight aborted but returned safely after Taylor heroically, and six times, climbed along connecting strut to transfer oil from a disabled engine to the operating one – Taylor consequently awarded Empire Gallantry Medal (1937).
- 1939 – navigator with Richard Archbold on first flight across Indian Ocean – Australia-Kenya.
- 1944 – commander of survey flight Bermuda-Australia via Mexico, Clipperton Island and New Zealand.
- 1951 – South Pacific flight, Australia-Chile via Tahiti and Easter Island, Taylor consequently awarded the Oswald Watt Gold Medal by the Aero Club Federation of Australia.

== Bibliography ==
Books authored by Taylor include:

- 1935 – Pacific Flight
- 1937 – VH-UXX
- 1939 – Call to the Winds
- 1948 – Forgotten Island
- 1953 – Frigate Bird
- 1963 – The Sky Beyond
- 1964 – Bird of the Islands
- 1968 – Sopwith Scout 7309
