= Peter Lloyd (aviator) =

Australian aviator (1920–2022)

Peter Lloyd AC OBE
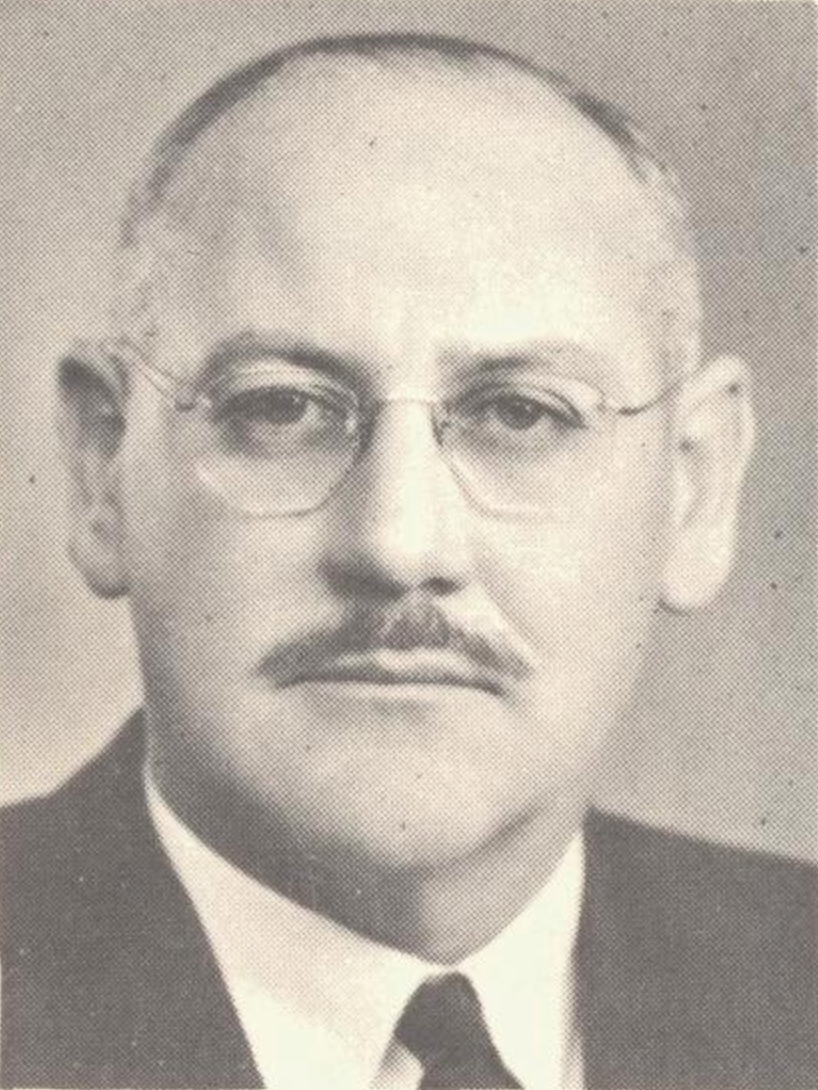
- Born: George Alfred Lloyd; 15 December 1920; Cremorne, New South Wales, Australia
- Died: 16 August 2022 (aged 101)
- Education: University of Sydney
- Known for: President of the Fédération Aéronautique Internationale (1986–88); President of the Royal Federation of Aero Clubs of Australia (1958–70); President of the Royal Aero Club of New South Wales (1957–67, 1972–74)
- Awards: Companion of the Order of Australia; Officer of the Order of the British Empire; Mentioned in Despatches; FAI Gold Air Medal; Oswald Watt Gold Medal

George Alfred Lloyd, AC OBE (15 December 1920 – 16 August 2022), known as Peter Lloyd, was an Australian aviator and businessman. From the 1950s, Lloyd was involved with administering aero clubs in Australia and internationally, as well as promoting air sports and air safety.

== Early life ==
Lloyd was born in Sydney in 1920, and attended Sydney Church of England Grammar School, and then the University of Sydney.

== Military service ==
On 31 May 1940, Lloyd enlisted in the Second Australian Imperial Force for service in the Second World War. He was assigned to the 2/6th Field Regiment and saw action in the Middle East and New Guinea, ending his service as a lance-sergeant. On 8 March 1945, Lloyd was mentioned in despatches for gallant and distinguished service in the South-West Pacific.

== Aviation career ==
On his return to Australia, Lloyd worked as an entrepreneur and grazier. In 1951, Lloyd was elected treasurer of the Royal Aero Club of New South Wales, and in 1955, he qualified as a pilot. In 1957, Lloyd became president of the club, a position he held for ten years, and then again from 1972 to 1974. He built up the club from poor condition to the largest aviation school in the British Commonwealth.

In 1958, Lloyd became president of the Federation of Australian Aero Clubs, and set about greatly increasing the federation's membership and promoting aviation sports throughout Australia.

Representing Australia Lloyd served as treasurer-general of the Fédération Aéronautique Internationale - The World Air Sports Federation from 1976 and then FAI President from 1986-1988.

== Personal life and death ==
Lloyd turned 100 on 15 December 2020, and died on 16 August 2022, at the age of 101.

== Honours ==
- In 1964, Lloyd was made an Officer of the Order of the British Empire (OBE) as president of the Royal Aero Club of New South Wales.
- In 1966, Royal Aeronautical Society medal, Adelaide branch.
- In 1969, he received the Oswald Watt Gold Medal—Australia's highest aviation award.
- In 1989, Lloyd was awarded the FAI Gold Air Medal—one of only three Australians to have won the award.
- In the 1990 Australia Day Honours, Lloyd was made an Officer of the Order of Australia for service to aviation and international relations.
- In 1992, he was inducted into the Sport Australia Hall of Fame.
- In the 2016 Queen's Birthday Honours, Lloyd was upgraded to a Companion of the Order of Australia (AC), for eminent service to the aviation industry, particularly to the advancement of air safety in Australia, through leading roles with national and international aeronautical organisations, and airsport associations.
- In 2016 he was awarded the Oswald Watt Gold Medal by the Royal Federation of Aero Clubs of Australia for the second time.
