= Endeavor Award =

The Endeavor Award is an award celebrating the contributions on the public benefit of flying.

The award was established in 2014 by producer and pilot Mark Wolper. The presenter's at the California Science Center for 2015 are Ben Affleck and Scott Terry.

2014
- Veterans Airlift Command
- Wings Flights of Hope
- Patient Airlift Services
2015
- Clay Lacy
- Ben Affleck, Scott Terry - Global Flight Relief
2026
- Chris Bennett, Volunteer Pilot with Angel Flight West
- Jerry Hill, Volunteer Pilot with Challenge Air for Kids and Friends

== See also ==
- List of aviation awards
