= Oswald Watt =

Australian aviation pioneer

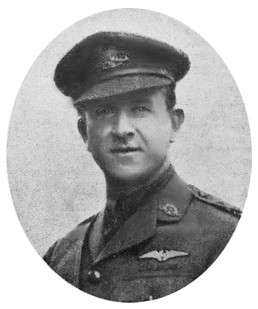
- Oswald Watt, Australian Flying Corps
- Born: Walter Oswald Watt; 11 February 1878; Bournemouth, England
- Died: 21 May 1921 (aged 43); Bilgola, New South Wales, Australia
- Relatives: John Brown Watt (father)
- Military career
- Allegiance: Australia; France
- Branch: Australian Military Forces; French Foreign Legion; Australian Flying Corps
- Service years: 1900–19
- Rank: Lieutenant Colonel
- Nickname: "Toby"
- Units: NSW Scottish Rifles (1900–14); Aviation Militaire (1914–16); No. 1 Squadron AFC (1916)
- Commands: No. 2 Squadron AFC (1916–18); 1st Training Wing AFC (1918–19)
- Conflicts: World War I; Western Front; Battle of Cambrai
- Awards: Officer of the Order of the British Empire; Mentioned in Despatches (2); Legion of Honour (France); Croix de guerre (France)
- Other work: Grazier, businessman

Walter Oswald Watt, OBE (11 February 1878 – 21 May 1921) was an Australian aviator and businessman. He served as a pilot during World War I with, firstly, the French Foreign Legion and, secondly, the Australian Flying Corps (AFC). The son of a Scottish-Australian merchant and politician, Watt was born in England and moved to Sydney when he was one year old, returning to Britain at the age of eleven for education at Bristol and Cambridge. In 1900 he returned to Australia, and enlisted in the Militia, before acquiring cattle stations in New South Wales and Queensland. He was also a partner in the family shipping firm.

The first Australian to qualify for a Royal Aero Club flying certificate, in 1911, Watt joined the Aviation Militaire of the French Foreign Legion as a pilot on the outbreak of World War I. He transferred to the Australian Flying Corps in 1916, quickly progressing from flight commander with No. 1 Squadron in Egypt to commanding officer of No. 2 Squadron on the Western Front. By February 1918, he had been promoted to lieutenant colonel and taken command of the AFC's 1st Training Wing in England.

A recipient of France's Legion of Honour and Croix de Guerre, and twice mentioned in despatches during the war, Watt was appointed an Officer of the Order of the British Empire in 1919. He left the military to pursue business interests in Australia, and was lauded for his generosity to other returned airmen. In 1921, aged 43, he died by accidental drowning at Bilgola Beach, New South Wales. He is commemorated by the Oswald Watt Gold Medal for outstanding achievement in Australian aviation, and the Oswald Watt Fund at the University of Sydney.

== Early career ==
Born on 11 February 1878 in Bournemouth, England, Oswald Watt was the youngest son of John Brown Watt, a Scot who had migrated to New South Wales in 1842 and became a successful merchant and politician, frequently representing his state on overseas missions. Oswald's Australian-born mother, Mary Jane, died when he was one and shortly afterwards the family relocated to Sydney. Oswald was sent back to England at the age of eleven to complete his schooling at Clifton College, Bristol, before going on to study at Trinity College, Cambridge, where he received a Bachelor of Arts degree in 1899. Returning to Sydney in 1900, he was commissioned as a second lieutenant in the New South Wales Scottish Rifles, a Militia unit, and in 1902 was appointed an aide-de-camp to the Governor of New South Wales. On 27 September that year, he married Muriel Williams at St. John's Anglican Church in Toorak, Victoria; the couple had one son.

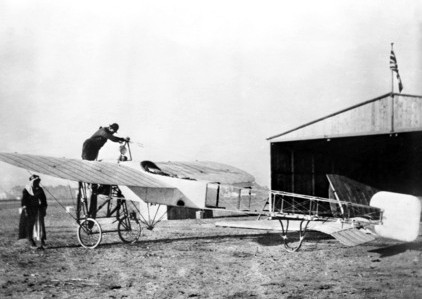
Watt's Bleriot XI monoplane in Egypt, 1913–14

Watt's family was wealthy, and he was able to establish himself as a grazier by purchasing several cattle stations in New South Wales and Queensland. Travelling abroad again, he obtained his Master of Arts degree from Cambridge in 1904. In October the following year he was promoted to captain in the Scottish Rifles. On a subsequent trip to England he took flying lessons at the Bristol aviation school on Salisbury Plain, where his fellow students included Eric Harrison. Watt attained his Royal Aero Club certificate, no. 112, on 1 August 1911, becoming the first Australian citizen so qualified. Upon his return to Australia later that year, he publicly declared that the time was "rapidly approaching when an aero corps [would] have to be inaugurated" as part of the country's "military defence scheme".

In March 1912, Watt recommended a location in Canberra near the Royal Military College, Duntroon, as a base for the Army's proposed Central Flying School. Owing to its altitude and nearby mountainous terrain, the site was rejected by the school's nominated commanding officer, Lieutenant Henry Petre. Petre eventually chose 297 hectares at Point Cook, Victoria, an area suitable for seaplanes as well as land-based aircraft, to become the "birthplace of Australian military aviation". Watt also advocated manufacturing foreign-designed aircraft under licence in Australia, but this would not be pursued until after World War I. In 1913 he was divorced on the grounds of "misconduct" with actress Ivy Schilling, and lost custody of his son in the judgment. He then went to Egypt, where he purchased and practised flying a Blériot XI monoplane; while there he met leading French aviators Louis Blériot and Roland Garros.

== World War I ==
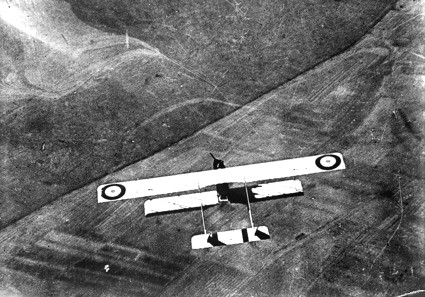
Watt flying a Farman biplane over Europe, 1915

In May 1914, the francophile Watt left Egypt with his aeroplane and took up employment at the Blériot factory and airfield in Buc, outside Paris. Fired by the widely held conviction that Britain would stay out of a European conflict, Watt offered his services and his plane to the French government on 2 August, the day France declared war on Germany. This gesture was welcomed and he joined the Aviation Militaire section of the Foreign Legion as a pilot. Though he was ranked an ordinary soldier, his colleagues in Bleriot Squadron No. 30 referred to him as "Capitaine" in deference to his previous status in the Australian Militia. Posted to Maurice Farman Squadron No. 44 in April 1915, he earned the Legion of Honour badge after he and his observer crash-landed in no man's land and succeeded in making their way back to French lines with valuable intelligence under intense fire from German positions. Soon afterwards, Watt was awarded the Croix de Guerre—with palm leaves personally presented by General Joffre—and promoted to the provisional rank of captain. He was not eligible to command a French unit because he was a foreigner. Watt always proclaimed his antipodean connection while serving France, painting a kangaroo on the nose of his plane, which he named Advance Australia. Considered a no-nonsense type, he once introduced himself to a British pilot with the words "I am an Australian and I haven't got any manners".

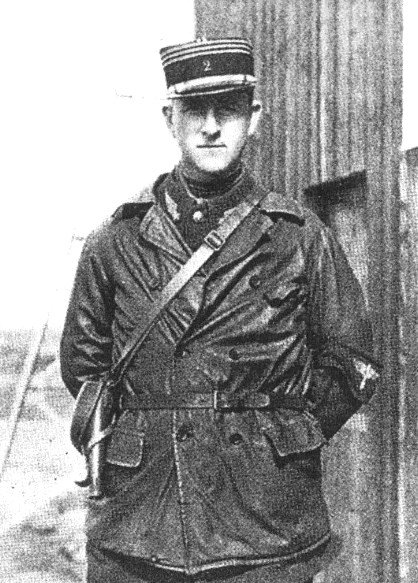
Watt in the Aviation Militaire

The French recognised that Watt's talents were not being fully utilised due to his ineligibility to lead a squadron, and recommended that he transfer to the Australian Flying Corps. Watt did so on 1 March 1916, with the rank of captain. Posted to Egypt in May, he was made commander of B Flight, No. 1 Squadron, and took charge of the unit's first contingent of Royal Aircraft Factory B.E.2s the following month. No. 1 Squadron was engaged mainly in aerial reconnaissance and army co-operation duties, but the two-seat B.E.2 proved inferior to German Fokkers and Rumplers in speed, time-to-climb, and manoeuvrability. In September 1916, Watt was promoted to major and given command of No. 2 Squadron, which was formed in Kantara. He was mentioned in despatches by General Archibald Murray, Commander-in-Chief of the Egyptian Expeditionary Force, on 13 October; the commendation was promulgated in the London Gazette on 1 December. No. 2 Squadron's personnel was composed largely of former Lighthorsemen, as well as thirteen mechanics from the Australian Flying Corps' first combat formation, the Mesopotamian Half Flight, led by Flight Sergeant George Mackinolty. Watt personally trained the force in England commencing in January 1917, before deploying it to the Western Front that September. He was "a born leader of men", according to one officer; another recalled that "In the things that mattered, his men knew he stood for absolute obedience. They also knew that when discipline could be safely relaxed he would be quick to grant them some relief from the strain."

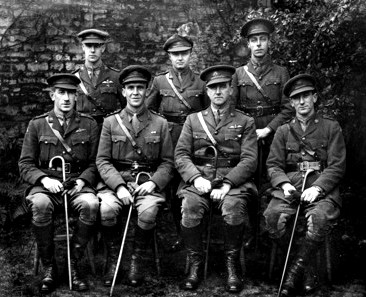
Lieutenant Colonel Watt (front row, second from right) with staff of the 1st Training Wing AFC, 1918

In the vicinity of Saint-Quentin on 2 October, No. 2 Squadron became the first AFC unit in Europe to see aerial combat when one of its patrols engaged some German two-seaters, which managed to escape. Because the Airco DH.5s in the squadron were handicapped as fighters by engine problems and low speed, the squadron was employed mainly in ground support duties. During the Battle of Cambrai that commenced on 20 November 1917, Watt led his pilots on daring low-level bombing and strafing attacks against enemy fortifications and lines of communication. Their loss rate reached 30%, but morale remained high. After visiting the squadron, the Royal Flying Corps' Major General Hugh Trenchard described its airmen as "really magnificent" and Charles Bean, war correspondent and future editor of the Official History of Australia in the War of 1914–1918, commented on their "remarkably high level of conduct and general tone". Six of Watt's officers were awarded the Military Cross for gallantry during the battle, prompting General Sir William Birdwood to send him a personal message of congratulation on 16 December, declaring: "... This is indeed a magnificent record for your squadron, and one of which I am sure everyone of you must rightly be extremely proud; I doubt if it has been beaten anywhere ..." By this time, No. 2 Squadron had begun converting to Royal Aircraft Factory S.E.5s, though it could achieve little in the winter months due to inclement weather. Watt himself, now almost forty, was beginning to show the strain of frontline command. Bean found him looking "very worn" and noticed him shivering even while seated in front of the mess hall fire.

In February 1918, Watt was promoted to lieutenant colonel and given command of the AFC's 1st Training Wing (Nos. 5, 6, 7 and 8 Squadrons) headquartered at Tetbury in Gloucestershire, England; the wing's role was to train replacement pilots for the four operational AFC squadrons in Palestine and France. Watt proposed moving the wing to France, but it remained in England. He was mentioned in despatches by Field Marshal Sir Douglas Haig on 7 April, and the commendation was gazetted on 28 May. Shortly after the end of hostilities in November 1918, novelist William John Locke visited 1st Training Wing and found that "there was not one [of Watt's men] who ... did not confide to me his pride in serving under a leader so distinguished". A pilot later opined that as well as having "courage, determination, and an immense capacity for work", Watt possessed "the greatest factor in leadership, a genius for endearing himself (without conscious effort) to all who served under him".

== Post-war career and legacy ==
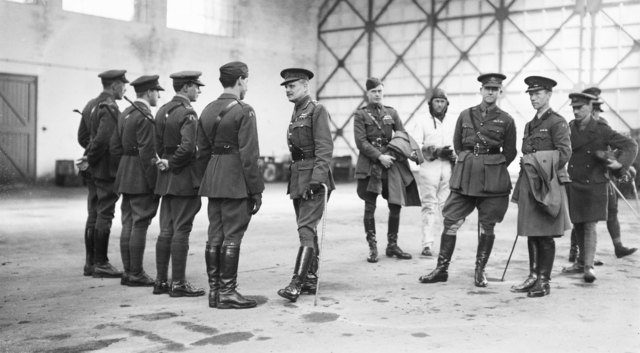
General Sir William Birdwood (fifth from left) with (left to right behind Birdwood) Major Roy Phillipps, Captain Les Holden (in flying suit), and Lieutenant Colonel Watt, Minchinhampton, March 1919

Watt was appointed an Officer of the Order of the British Empire on 1 January 1919, in recognition of his war service. He returned to Australia on 6 May with the rest of 1st Training Wing's personnel, aboard the troopship Kaisar-i-Hind, on which he was the ranking officer. Leaving the AFC soon afterwards, he was elected president of the New South Wales section of the Australian Aero Club. He also served as senior delegate on a committee of veteran military pilots examining applications for appointment to a proposed independent Australian air service. Watt was esteemed as a man who did not forget old comrades, providing former AFC members with financial aid and helping them re-establish themselves in civilian life. He maintained an interest in commercial flying but refused an offer to take up the position of controller of civil aviation in 1920 owing to his business interests, which included partnership in the family shipping firm of Gilchrist, Watt & Sanderson Ltd, and directorships of mining, rubber, and art corporations. He also turned down invitations to stand for parliament, and to join the fledgling Royal Australian Air Force.

Oswald Watt drowned at Bilgola Beach, near Newport, New South Wales, on 21 May 1921. Cuts and bruising on his body indicated that he had slipped on rocks, struck his head, and rolled unconscious into relatively shallow water. Survived by his 15-year-old son, he was accorded a military funeral two days later at St Jude's Church, Randwick. Members of the AFC, Royal Air Force, and Australian Aero Club formed a guard of honour at the service, one of the largest in the suburb's history, which also included representatives of the Royal Australian Navy and Australian Army. Among the tributes was a floral wreath from an anonymous group of French admirers, and another that was dropped by parachute from a low-flying plane. On 31 May, Watt's body was cremated and his ashes interred in the family vault at St Jude's.

In his will, Watt left two bequests to the Australian Aero Club, one of which was used to establish the Oswald Watt Gold Medal for outstanding achievement in Australian aviation. Winners of the award have included Charles Kingsford Smith, Bert Hinkler, Henry Millicer, Ivor McIntyre, Jon Johanson and Andy Thomas. He also bequeathed a sum to the Royal Military College, Duntroon, to award annually a set of binoculars for the best cadet essay on military aviation or aeronautics. The award was founded as the Oswald Watt Prize later in 1921. Most of the residue of Watt's estate went to the University of Sydney. Considered one of the university's great benefactors, he was commemorated by the Oswald Watt Fund. In May 1923, the Oswald Watt Wing of the Havilah Home for Orphans, Wahroonga, was opened by the Governor-General of Australia. Watt was acknowledged as both a source and a reviewer by F. M. Cutlack in the latter's volume on the Australian Flying Corps that was first published in 1923 as part of the Official History of Australia in the War of 1914–1918. During World War I, Oswald Watt had been the only AFC officer to command a wing apart from Lieutenant Colonel Richard Williams, who was later to become known as the "Father of the RAAF". In 2001, military historian Alan Stephens noted that "had fate drawn him to a post-war career in the Air Force instead of to business and an untimely death, 'Toby' Watt might have challenged Richard Williams as the RAAF's dominant figure in its formative years".
