= Fincastle Trophy =

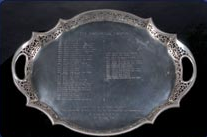
Fincastle Trophy

The International Fincastle Competition is a contest of skills between the air forces of the United Kingdom, Australia, Canada and New Zealand. During the competition, crews compete in anti-submarine warfare, anti-surface warfare, and intelligence and surveillance gathering.

== Origins ==
The Fincastle Competition began in 1960 when Mr. and Mrs. Aird-Whyte presented a silver tray, (now the Fincastle Trophy), in memory of their son Sergeant Nairn Fincastle Aird-Whyte, (who was killed in action in 1943 while flying with the RAF Coastal Command). Initially the competition was for accuracy in depth charge bombing showcase but it has evolved over the years to reflect the new duties of today's air forces. The competition fosters relations among the four participating nations while encouraging learning and skill sharing.

== Results ==
RAF 17 Victories

RAAF 13 Victories

RCAF 8 Victories

RNZAF 8 Victories

=== ASW Bombing Competition ===
Crews flew over their own home waters and sent results to an Adjudicating Committee in London for the selection of the winner.

Year	Winner
1961	RAAF
1962	RCAF
1963	RAAF
1964	RNZAF
1965	RCAF
1966	RAF
1967	RAAF
1968	RAAF
1969	RAAF

=== ASW Competition ===
Format as per previous competition (in home waters), but using a wider range of ASW skills to evaluate the winner.

Year	Winner
1970	RAF

=== ASW Competition ===
From 1971, the competition sorties were flown from a common venue, exercising ASW skills in a set format gradually evolved over the years, but kept to a broadly consistent focus.

Year	Venue	Host	Submarine	Winner
1971	Comox	CF	HMCS Rainbow	RAAF/CF (tied)
1972	Tengah	RAF	HMAS Onslow	RAAF
1973	Edinburgh	RAAF	HMAS Oxley	RAF
1974	Whenuapai	RNZAF	HMAS Oxley	RAF
1975	Greenwood	CF	HMCS Okanagan	RAF/RAAF
1976	Kinloss	RAF	HMS Ocelot	RAF
1977	Edinburgh	RAAF	HMAS Otway	RAF
1978	Whenuapai	RNZAF	HMAS Otway	RAAF
1979	Greenwood	CF	HMCS Okanagan	RAAF
1980	St Mawgan	RAF	HMS Ocelot	RNZAF
1981	Edinburgh	RAAF	HMAS Oxley	CF
1982	Whenuapai	RNZAF	HMAS Otama	RNZAF
1983	Greenwood	CF	HMCS Okanagan	RNZAF
1984	Edinburgh	RAAF	HMAS Oxley	RAF
1985	Kinloss	RAF	HMS Conqueror	CF
1986	Edinburgh	RAAF	HMAS Onslow	RAF
1987	Greenwood	CF	HMCS Okanagan	RAF
1988	Edinburgh	RAAF	HMAS Onslow	RNZAF
1989	St Mawgan	RAF	HMS Conqueror	CF
1990	Greenwood	CF	HMS Onyx	RAF
1991	Edinburgh	RAAF	HMAS Ovens	RNZAF
1992	Kinloss	RAF	HMS Superb	RAF
1993	Greenwood	CF	HMCS Ojibwa	RAAF
1994	Edinburgh	RAAF	HMAS Onslow	RAAF
1995	Kinloss	RAF	HMS Torbay	CF
1996	Whenuapai	RNZAF	HMAS Onslow	CF
1997	Comox	CF	HMCS Ojibwa	RNZAF
1998	Edinburgh	RAAF	HMAS Onslow	RNZAF
1999	Kinloss	RAF	HMS Trenchant	RAF
2000	No Competition	-	-	-
2001	Edinburgh	RAAF	HMAS Waller	RAF
2002	Kinloss	RAF	HMS Trafalgar	RAF
2003	Pearce	RAAF	HMAS Sheean	RAAF
2004	No Competition	-	-	-
2005	Whenuapai	RNZAF	HMAS Farncomb	RAF

=== MPA ISTAR Competition ===
Format was changed to focus on a broader range of Intelligence, Surveillance, Target Acquisition, and Reconnaissance (ISTAR) missions, as well as retaining an ASW component. Rather than a dedicated submarine, the competition is held in conjunction with a major exercise.

Year	Venue	Host	Exercise	Winner
2006	Kinloss	RAF	NEPTUNE WARRIOR	RAF
2008	Comox	CF	MAPLE GUARDIAN	RAF

== Fincastle Patches ==
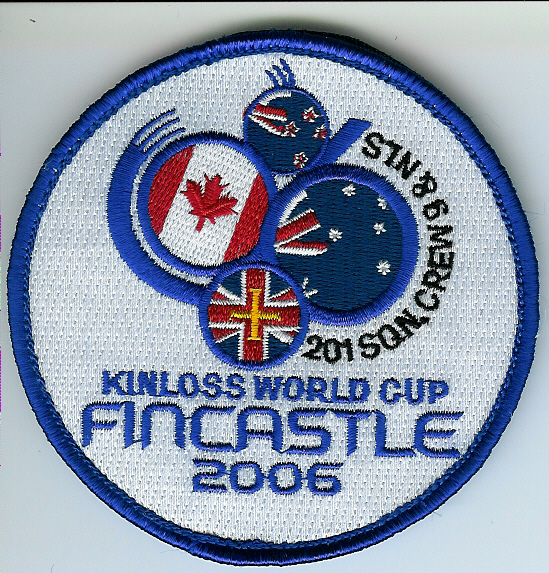
Fincastle 2006

== Maintenance Trophy ==
In 1996 Lockheed Martin sponsored the first Fincastle Maintenance Trophy. According to the Canadian Air Force, competition for the Maintenance Trophy "evaluates each team’s skills with maintenance, support, and flight line operations."

== Sources ==
- Canadian Air Forces article
- 2005 competition
- 2006 competition
- Fincastle Committee
