= Maintenance Trophy =

Award by Lockheed Martin

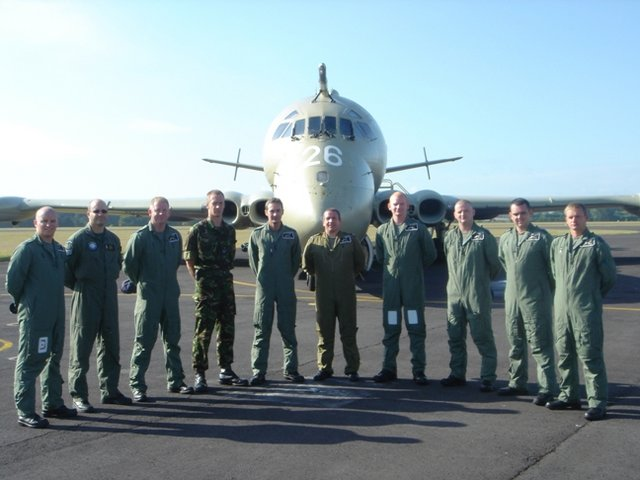
Nimrod Line Sqn 2005 Groundcrew

The Maintenance Trophy is awarded by Lockheed Martin and was introduced in 1996 at the Fincastle competition.

== Origins ==
The Lockheed Martin Fincastle Maintenance Trophy was first introduced during Fincastle 1996, which was held in New Zealand. It was felt the competition would strengthen relations between the competing countries, allowing them to learn from each other as well as involving the maintenance teams in the competitive spirit of Fincastle . It is designed to foster relations among the four competing nations (RAF, RCAF, RNZAF and RAAF) and encourage learning and sharing skills in a competitive atmosphere.

The competition runs in parallel to and is intrinsically linked to the Fincastle Competition, which the aircrew compete for. The competition is judged by a team of Senior Non-Commissioned Officers SNCOs, one from each nation, led by an Engineering Officer from the host country. Teams are examined on their flight line operations, the quality of their support elements, engineering skills and a team interview.

== Participants ==
RAF

RCAF

RNZAF

RAAF

== Trophy Winners ==
- 1996 Hosted by RNZAF Won by RCAF, Greenwood's 405 MPS
- 1998 Hosted by RAAF Won by RAAF 492 Squadron
- 1999 Hosted by RAF Kinloss Won by RCAF, Greenwood's 405 MPS
- 2001 Hosted by RAAF Won by RCAF, Greenwood's 405 MPS
- 2004 Hosted by RAAF Won by RNZAF Whenuapai, 5 SQN
- 2005 Hosted by RNZAF Won by RAF Kinloss, Nimrod Line Sqn
- 2006 Hosted by RAF Kinloss Won by RNZAF Whenuapai, 5 SQN
- 2008 Hosted by CFB Comox Won by 10 Sqn RAAF

== See also ==
- List of aviation awards
