= Jon Johanson =

Australian aviator

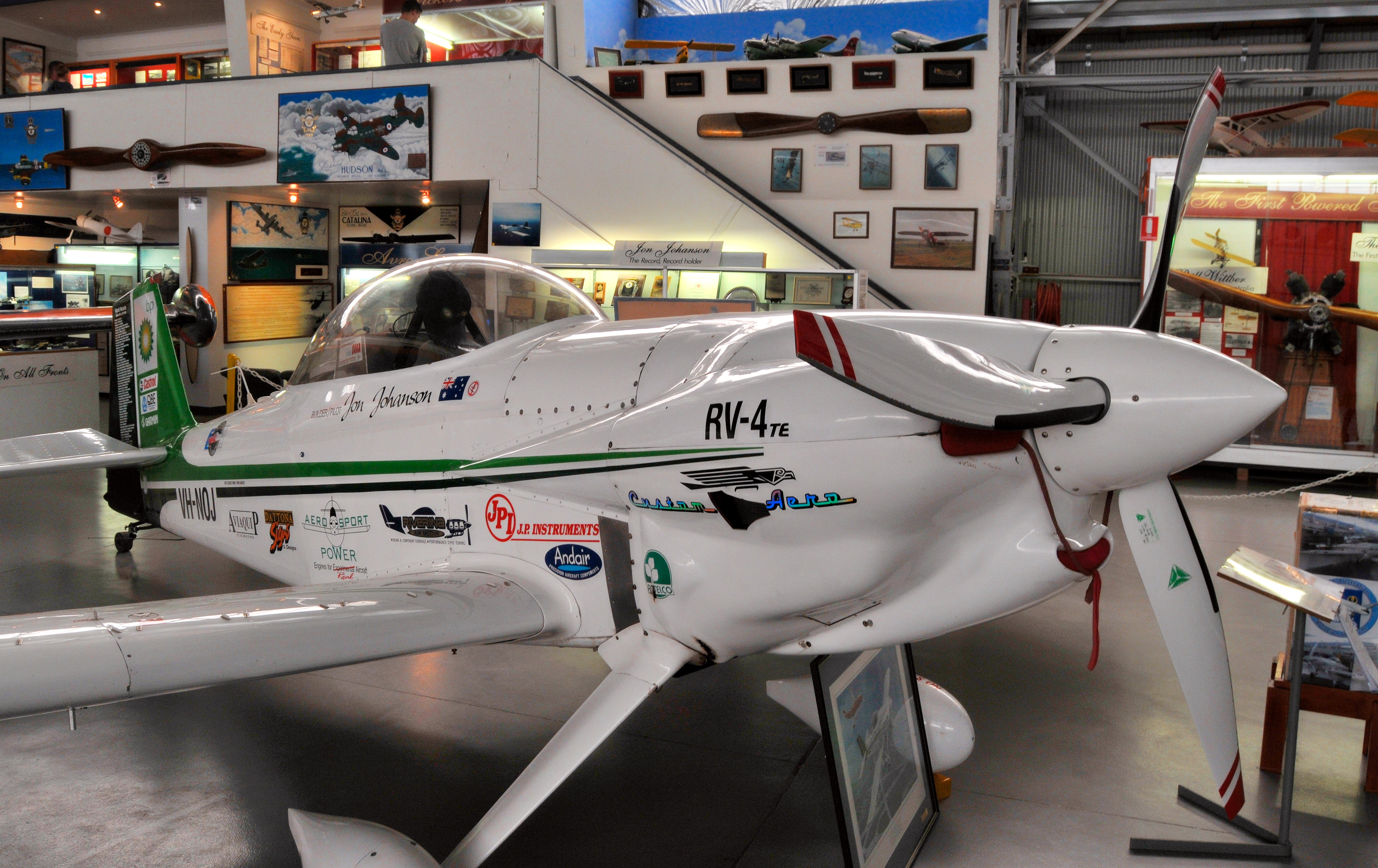
Jon Johanson's RV-4 on display at the Port Adelaide aviation museum in 2009

Jon Johanson (born 1956) is an Australian aviator known for his pioneering flights in a home-built Van's Aircraft RV-4.

== Early life ==
Johanson was born in 1956 in Warburton, Victoria, the third of four children. His father was a dairy farmer in Bairnsdale, East Gippsland. Johanson had his first solo flight at age 46, following which the family relocated to Horsham, where his interest in aviation grew.

== Flights ==
In 1995, Johanson flew easterly around the world and made a stop over flight at Oshkosh, Wisconsin at the EAA. In 1996 he made another stop over flight to Oshkosh, Wisconsin for the EAA, then Johanson flew his second around the world flight going westerly. On his third around the world flight in 2000, Johanson set four aviation world records. As he was flying over the North Pole the cold air cracked his windscreen.

In 2003, he made the first solo flight in a single-engine home-built aircraft over the South Pole. After landing at the McMurdo-Scott base he became stranded when the base, not wishing to encourage future private flights, refused to sell him fuel. After a fuel donation by fellow adventurer Polly Vacher, he was able to fly on to Australia, via New Zealand.

== Awards and records ==
In 1995 Johanson was award the Oswald Watt Gold Medal which is Australia's highest aviation award by the Royal Federation of Aero Clubs of Australia (RFACA). In 2004 Johanson was also awarded the FAI Gold Air Medal by the Fédération Aéronautique Internationale (FAI); it is one of the organisation's highest awards. At the time he held 47 FAI world records. The same year, Johanson was also named the Adventurer of the Year by the Australian Geographic Society.

== Personal life ==
Johanson is a member of the Seventh-day Adventist Church, although he acknowledged in an interview with an Adventist publication that he was not a "good one". In addition to being a pilot, Johanson is also a qualified nurse, midwife, and carpenter.
