= Royal Federation of Aero Clubs of Australia =

General aviation peak body in Australia

- Abbreviation: RFACA
- Founded: March 1926; 100 years ago
- Type: Non-profit peak body
- Purpose: General aviation advocacy, flying training, and air sports
- Headquarters: Martin Place, Sydney, NSW, Australia
- Key people: Lachlan Hyde JP MLO (President); Anthony Jones (Secretary); Gary Tonkin (Treasurer)
- Website: rfaca.com.au
- Formerly called: Aero Club Federation of Australia (1948–1960); Associated Australian Aero Clubs (1929–1948); Australian Aero Club Federal Council (1926–1929)

The Royal Federation of Aero Clubs of Australia (RFACA) is the non-profit peak body representing aero clubs, flight training organisations, and other aviation associations in Australia. It is involved in general aviation advocacy, supporting flight training, and organising air sports activities.

The organisation traces its origins to the Australian aero club movement established at Point Cook, Victoria in 1914, and to the formal constitution of the Australian Aero Club in 1915. A national federal body emerged in March 1926 as the Australian Aero Club Federal Council, later becoming the Associated Australian Aero Clubs in 1929 and the Aero Club Federation of Australia in 1948. The prefix "Royal" was granted in 1960, after which the organisation adopted its present name.

Among its activities, RFACA has organised or supported an annual General Aviation and Flying Training Conference, the Australian Light Aircraft Championships, scholarships for trainee pilots, and a range of aviation awards including its role in selecting recipients of the Oswald Watt Gold Medal.

== History ==
Origins of the Royal Federation of Aero Clubs of Australia trace back to 28 October 1914 when young officers from the Australian Flying Corps met in Point Cook, Victoria. This meeting saw the establishment of the Australian Aero Club (AAC) which became affiliated with the Royal Aero Club of Great Britain. World War 1 interrupted the AAC's development however state sections were formed following the war.

In March 1926, a national federal body was established as the Australian Aero Club Federal Council. In 1929, after the adoption of a new constitution, the organisation became the Associated Australian Aero Clubs. It was renamed the Aero Club Federation of Australia in 1948.

After World War II, the aero club movement continued to play a role in pilot training and aviation development in Australia. Member clubs trained National Service and Air Training Corps cadets, reservists, and university air squadron cadets, before the emphasis later shifted towards the training of commercial pilots for airlines, aerial agriculture, and charter operations. By 1950, the Aero Club Federation of Australia was holding annual conferences and expanding its affiliated membership.

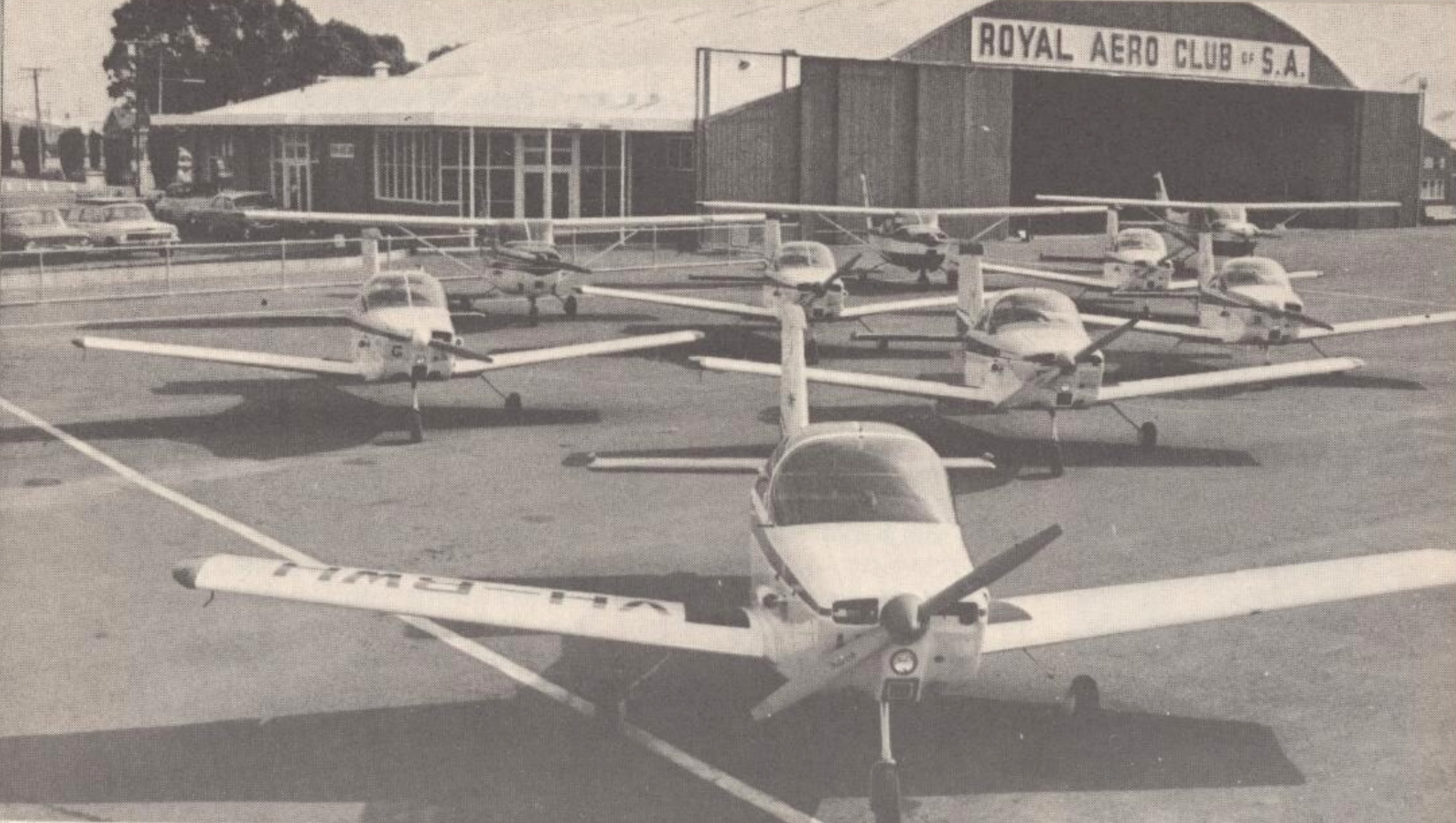
Royal Aero Club of South Australia aircraft at Parafield in the 1950s.

In April 1960, the RFACA was honoured by Queen Elizabeth II who granted the prefix "Royal" in recognition of the Federation's position as a leading organisation in the Australian aviation scene. Consequently, the club adopted the name Royal Federation of Aero Clubs of Australia.

Through the 1960s, the aero club movement was described as a nationwide non-profit training network extending across Australia and the Territory of Papua and New Guinea. By 1966 it was reported to comprise 41 aero clubs and more than 9,000 active fliers, reflecting the scale of the movement at its post-war height. In 1968, Prince Philip, Duke of Edinburgh, opened the federation's annual conference in Canberra during his Australian visit.

In later decades, the federation continued to coordinate national conferences and aviation competitions, and under the presidency of Peter Lloyd it grew from eight clubs to 82 while also encouraging the development of other aviation sports, including gliding, ballooning, parachuting, hang-gliding and model aircraft.

The federation also represented the Fédération Aéronautique Internationale in Australia for more than 50 years until the Air Sport Australia Confederation because Australia's representative in 1990.

== Activities ==
=== Advocacy and flight training ===
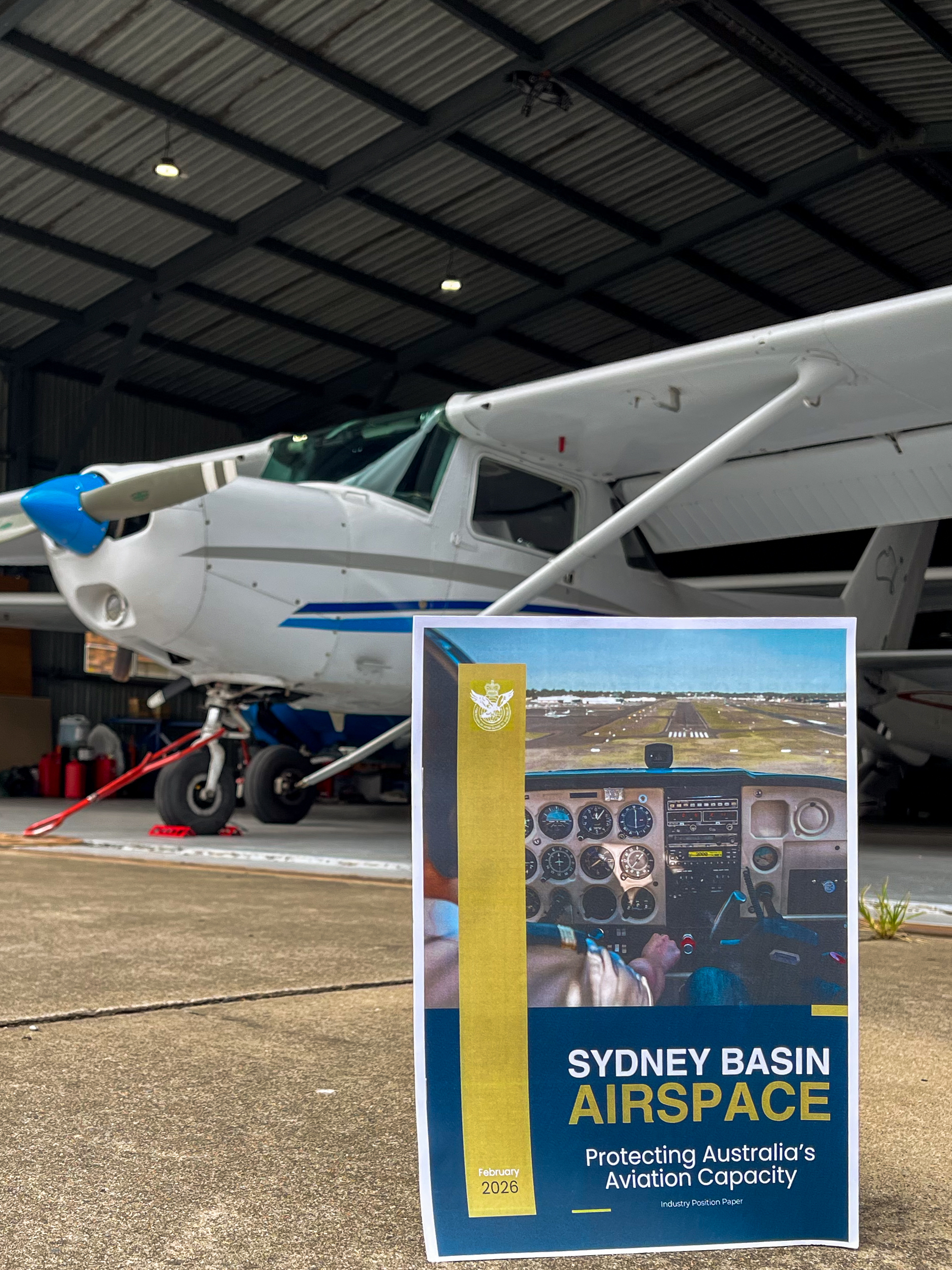
RFACA’s 2026 industry position paper, Sydney Basin Airspace: Protecting Australia’s Aviation Capacity.

The federation has been involved in general aviation advocacy and matters affecting flight training in Australia. In 2026, RFACA publicly raised concerns about proposed Sydney Basin airspace changes associated with Western Sydney Airport, arguing that the measures could reduce capacity for flight training and general aviation operations at Bankstown Airport.

Federation material from 1966 shows that RFACA’s advocacy role long included arguments for government support to preserve a national pilot-training network. At the time, the federation said aero clubs were responsible for more than 15 per cent of all pilot training hours flown in Australia. It argued that aero clubs also provided essential training access in regional centres that were financially unattractive to commercial flying schools.

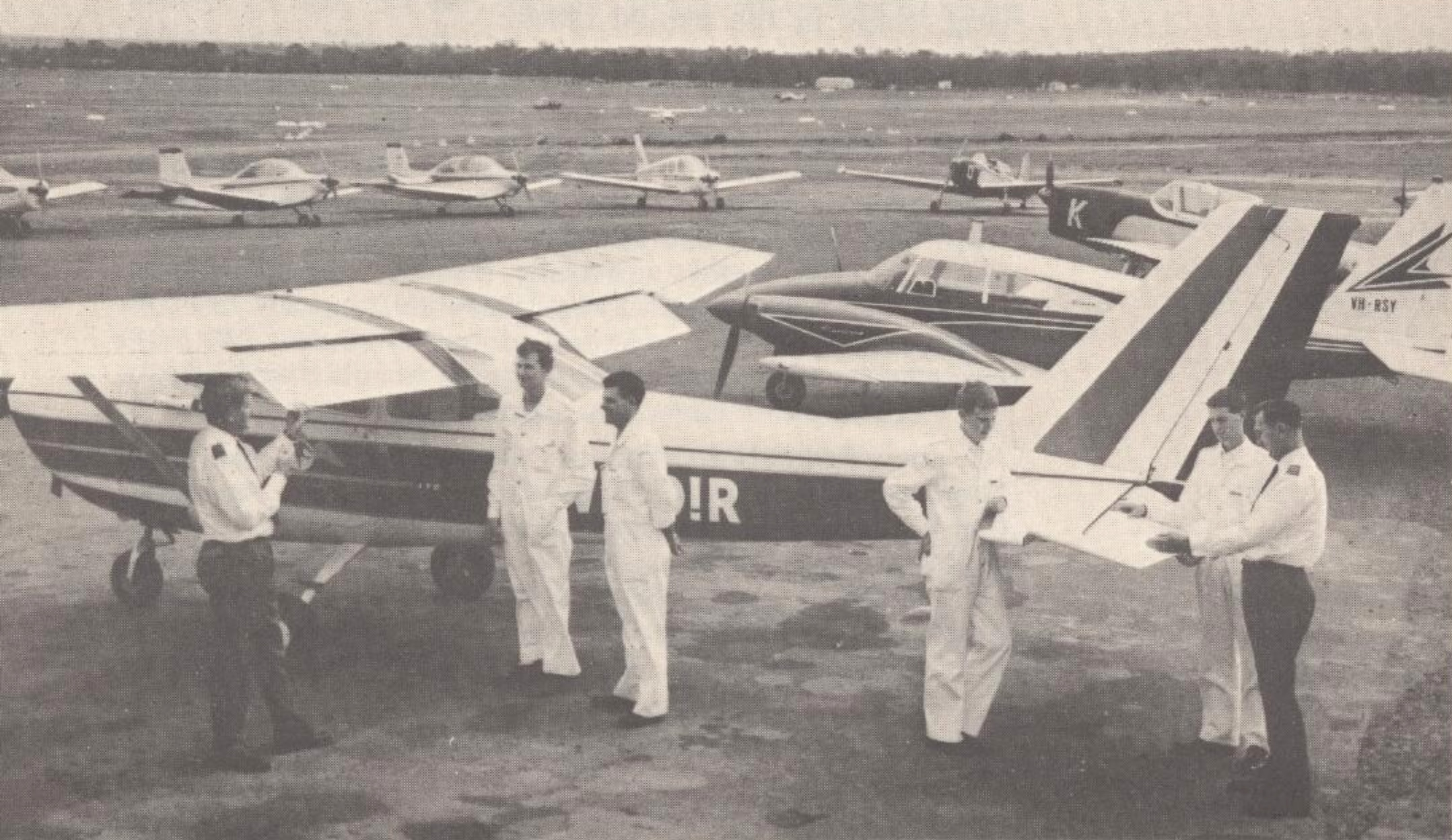
Qantas cadet pilots training at a member aero club in the 1960s. RFACA later pointed to such schemes as part of its contribution to pilot training in Australia.

The federation was also involved in structured pilot-training pathways. In 1966 it highlighted the training of Colombo Plan students at the Royal Aero Club of New South Wales and the arrangement of Qantas cadet pilot training through the aero club system. RFACA later described the Airline Pilot Training Scheme as a low-cost pathway whose graduates were held in high regard by the airline industry.

RFACA has also organised an annual conference for the general aviation and flying training sectors. This event is described as a forum for flying clubs, instructors, regulators and other aviation stakeholders to discuss matters affecting general aviation and pilot training.

Department of Transport speeches to RFACA conferences in 1970s show that the annual conference had also become an established forum for direct discussion between the federation and government on matters affecting general aviation. In 1980, the Department told the conference that RFACA had been closely consulted on reforms to flight crew licensing standards, including a new flight instructor rating scheme, revised training syllabuses and the proposed biennial flight review for private and business pilots.

=== Australian Light Aircraft Championships ===
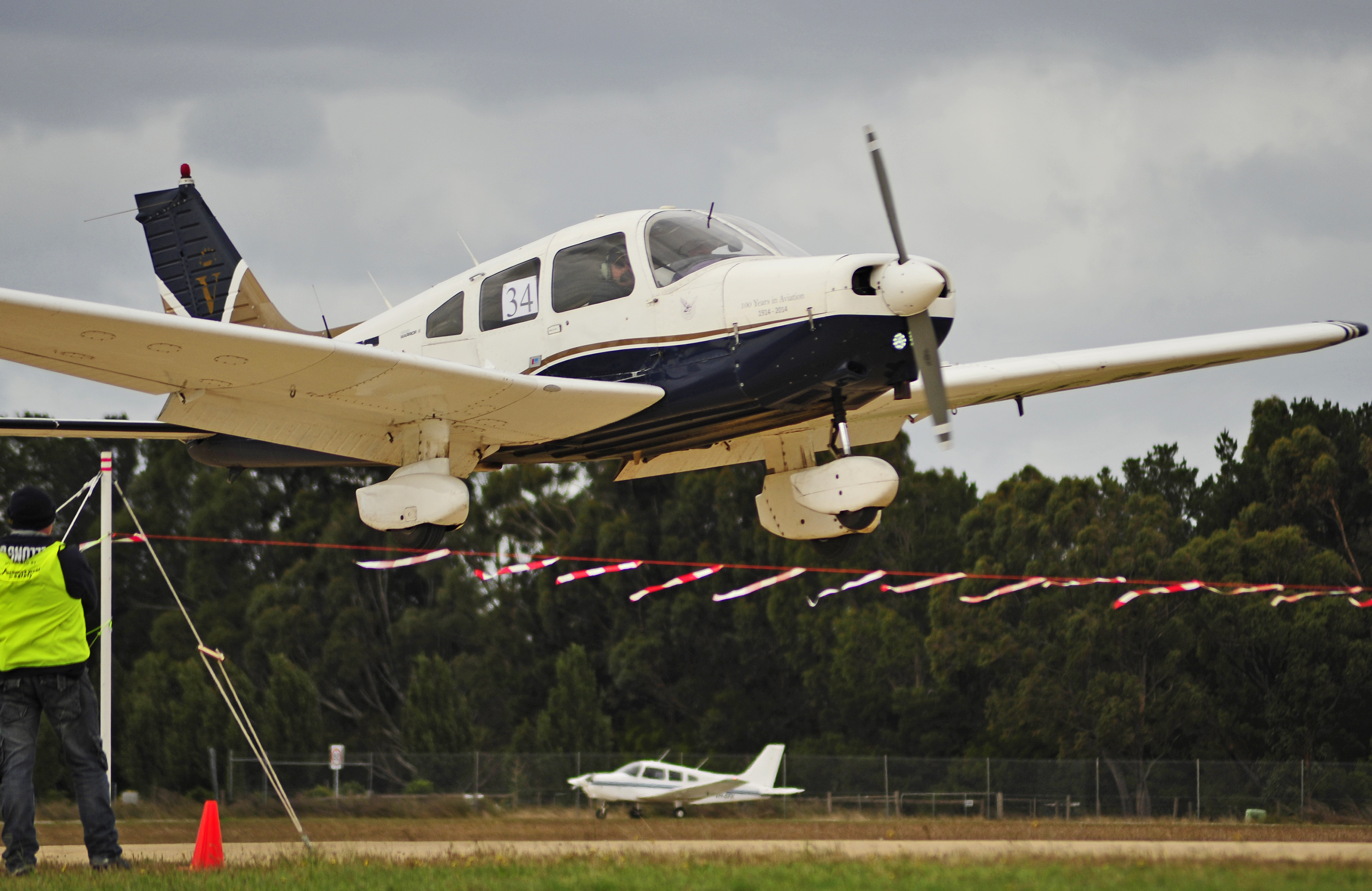
Royal Victorian Aero Club PA28 Warrior taking part in the 2017 ALACs at Latrobe Regional Airport.

Since 1957, the RFACA has organised the Australian Light Aircraft Championships (ALACs), a national competition for non-professional pilots held in conjunction with a host aero club. The championships are held annually and include precision flying events such as forced landing, aerobatics, streamer cutting, spot landing, and formation flying. The most recent edition was hosted by the Latrobe Valley Aero Club at Traralgon in 2026.

The winners of the Australian Light Aircraft Championships have also represented Australia in the Wings International competition, a trans-Tasman event held in conjunction with Flying New Zealand (formerly the Royal New Zealand Aero Club) between Australian and New Zealand competitors. Hosting of Wings International alternates between Australia and New Zealand, with the most recent edition hosted by the South Canterbury Aero Club at Timaru in 2026.

=== Scholarships ===
RFACA administers scholarship programs for student pilots training with member flight schools. For over 15 years, Airservices Australia have supported "Learn to Fly" Scholarships presented in conjunction with the federation at its annual flying conference.

== Awards and honours ==
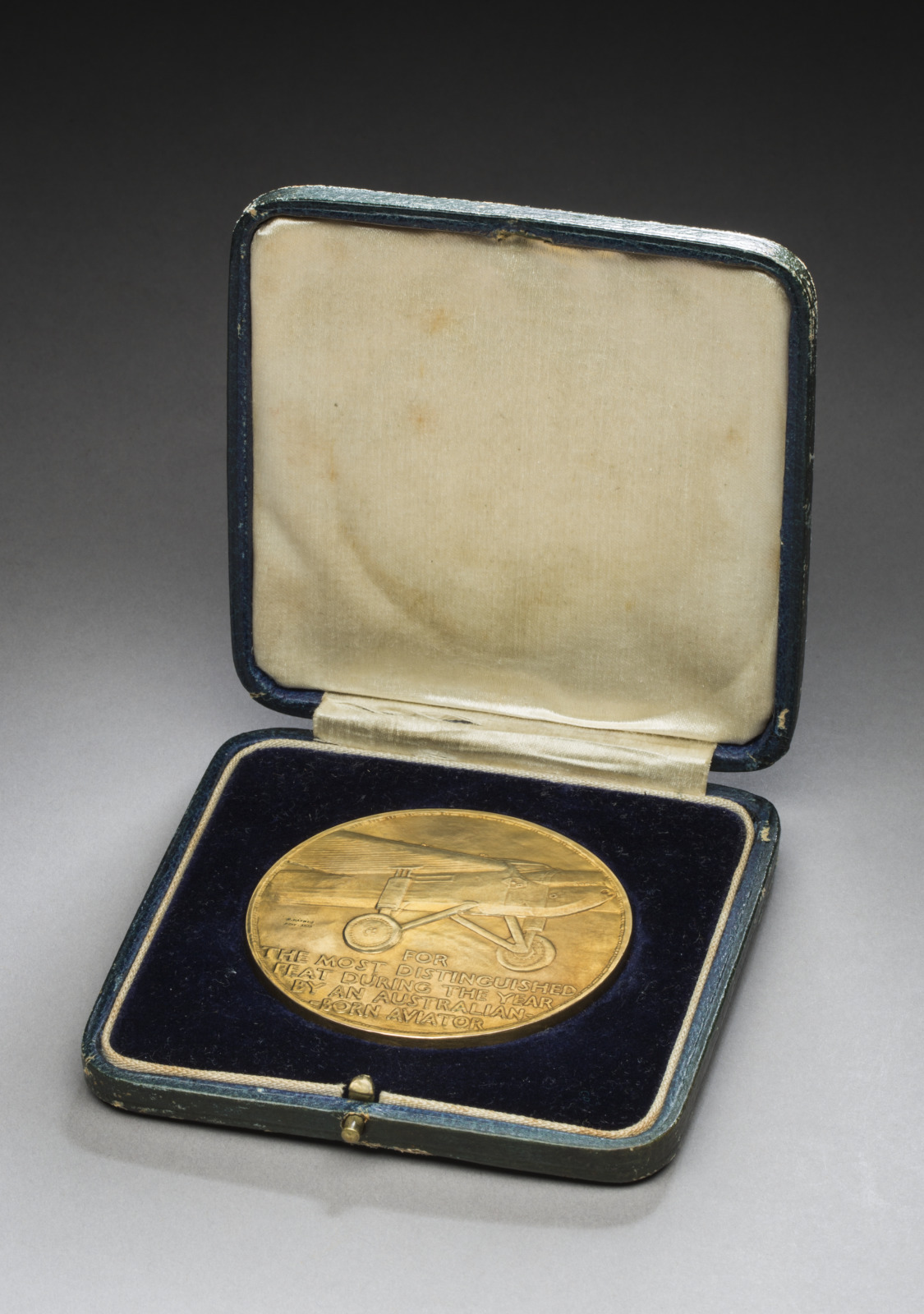
Photograph of the Oswald Watt Gold Medal as presented to Edgar Percival in 1936.

RFACA has administered a range of aviation awards and honours recognising achievement in the air, service to the aero club movement, and instructional experience.

The Oswald Watt Gold Medal is one of Australia's best-known aviation awards. It is named after Lieutenant Colonel Walter Oswald Watt, an early Australian military aviator and aero club leader who became foundation president of the New South Wales Section of the Australian Aero Club in 1919; after his death in 1921, he left £500 to fund a gold medal for "the most brilliant performance in the air" by an Australian or in Australia.

The Federation Award was established in 1962 to recognise long-standing and outstanding contributions by members or employees of aero clubs to their organisations and to the broader aero club movement.

The Jack Fahey Memorial Award was established in 2001 to recognise distinguished service to the general aviation industry and the aero club movement, including contributions in policy, political representation, and the organisation of major aviation events.

The Des Kelly AM Special Achievement Award was established in 2007 to recognise an outstanding performance in the air.

RFACA has also overseen the Master Instructor Certificate, awarded to highly experienced flight instructors who meet specified instructional and professional criteria.

== See also ==
- Australian Light Aircraft Championships
- Oswald Watt Gold Medal
