= Echuca Airport =

Echuca Aerodrome
- IATA: ECH; ICAO: YECH

Summary
- Airport type: Public
- Operator: Echuca Aerodrome Committee of Management
- Location: Echuca, Victoria
- Opened: c. 1935
- Elevation AMSL: 323 ft (98 m)
- Coordinates: 36°09′26″S 144°45′43″E
- Website: www.campaspe.vic.gov.au/discover/visit-campaspe/echuca-aerodrome/

Map
- Location in Victoria

Runways
Direction	Length		Surface
Direction	m	ft	Surface
05/23	510	1,673	Gravel
17/35	1,102	3,615	Asphalt
- Sources: Australian AIP and aerodrome chart

Echuca Airport (IATA: ECH, ICAO: YECH) is located 1.5 nautical miles (2.8 km; 1.7 mi) south of Echuca, Victoria, Australia.

== See also ==
- List of airports in Victoria, Australia
