= Serpentine Airfield =

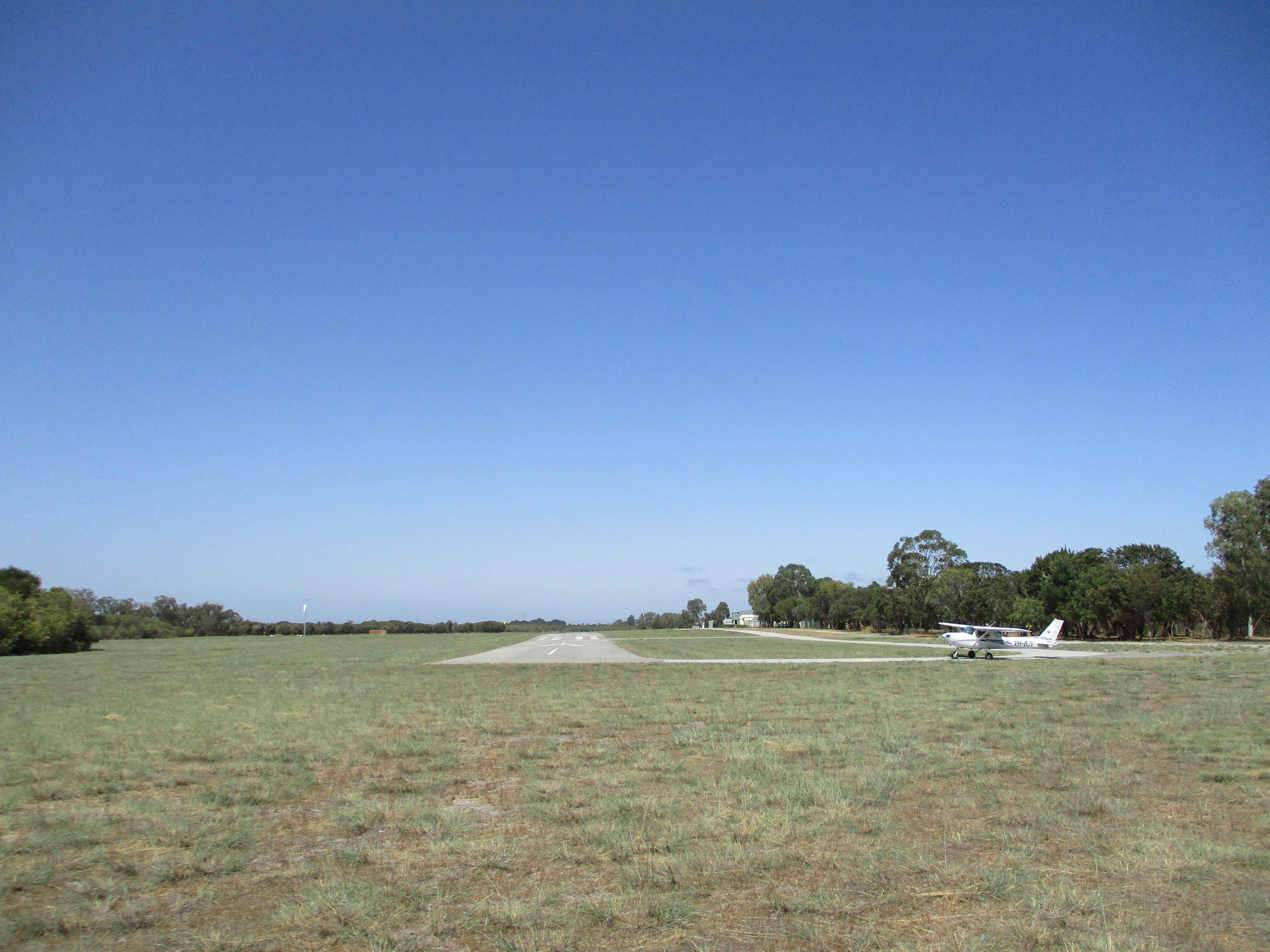
- An aircraft just before take off at Serpentine Airfield
- IATA: none; ICAO: YSEN

Summary
- Airport type: Private
- Operator: Sport Aircraft Builders Club of Western Australia
- Location: Hopeland, Western Australia
- Elevation AMSL: 9 ft / 3 m
- Coordinates: 32°23′39″S 115°52′20″E

Map
- Location in Western Australia

Runways
Direction	Length		Surface
Direction	m	ft	Surface
05/23	900	2,953	tarmac
09/27	600	1,969	grass

Serpentine Airfield (ICAO: YSEN) is located at Hopeland, Western Australia.

The airfield is operated by the Sport Aircraft Builders Club of Western Australia. As of 2023 the club has about 350 members, 100 hangars and approximately 135 aircraft including many rare and unique examples.

== Gallery ==
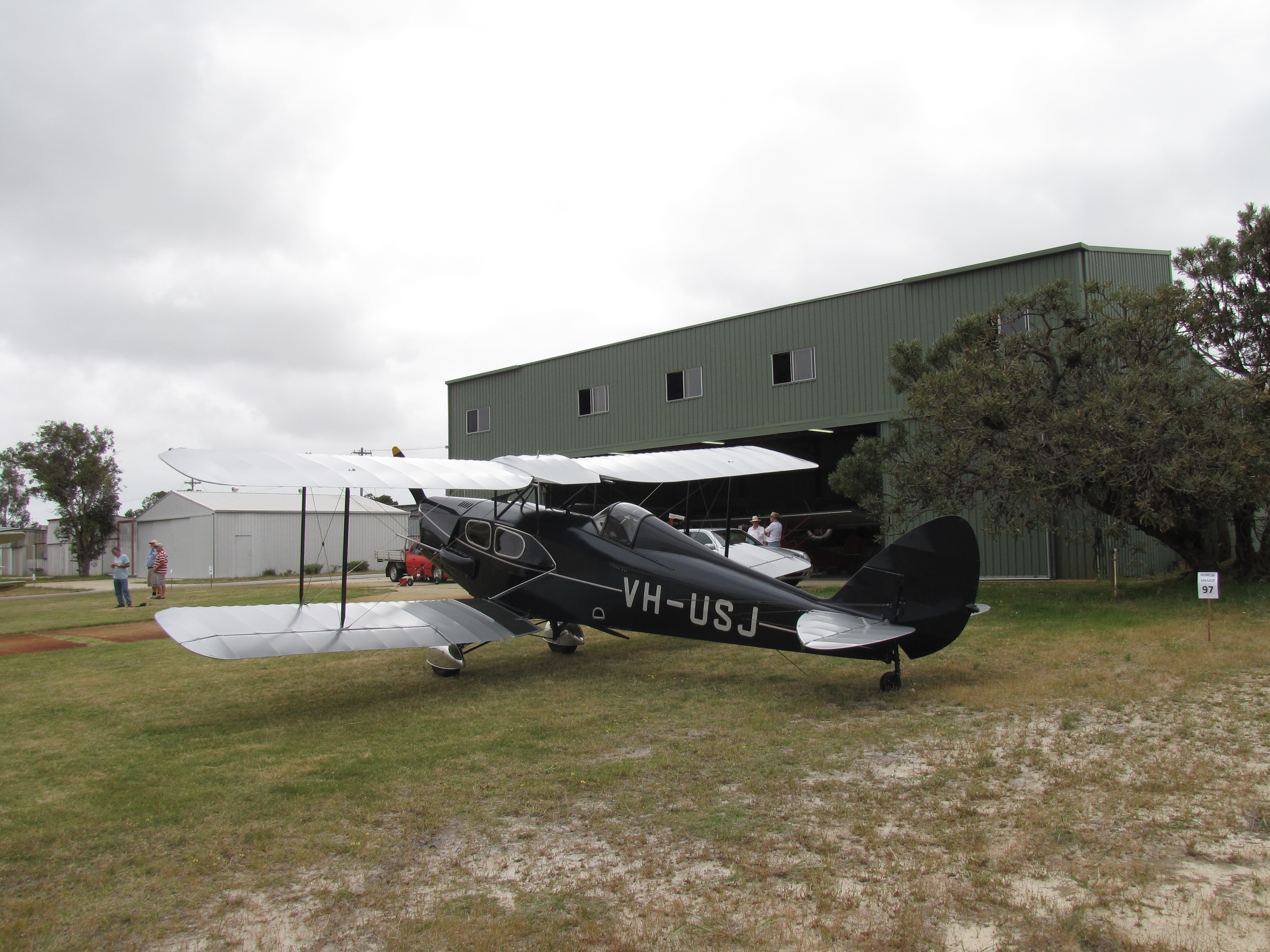
De Havilland DH83 Fox Moth

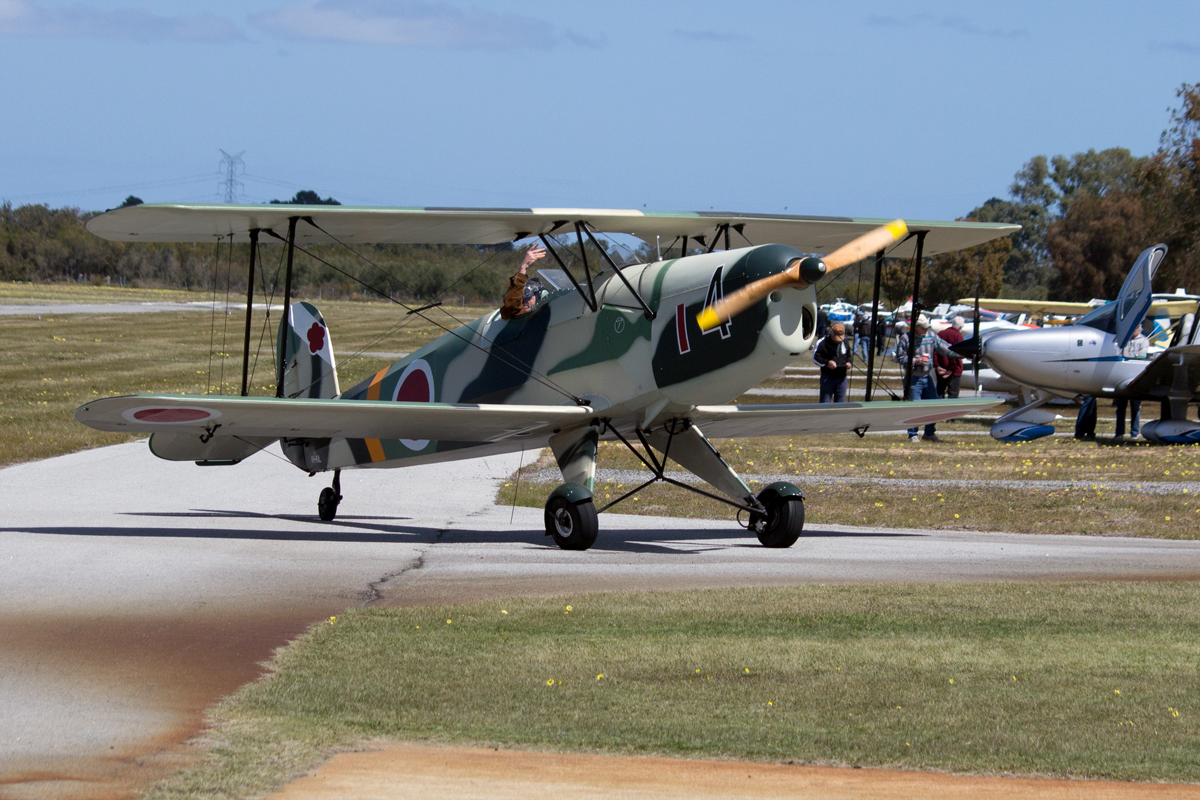
Bücker Bü 131 Jungmann

== See also ==
- List of airports in Western Australia
- Transport in Australia § Aviation
