= Royal Aero Club of New South Wales =

Australian aero club

- Abbreviation: RACNSW
- Nickname: 'The Royal'
- Founded: 10 November 1920; 105 years ago
- Founder: Oswald Watt OBE
- Headquarters: Strawberry Hills, New South Wales
- Training base: Camden Airport, New South Wales
- AOC #: CASA.141 FTO.0433
- Fleet size: 5
- Key people: Lachlan Hyde JP MLO (President & Chairman); Martin Sauer (CEO); Barry Sadler (Head of Training Operations)
- Website: https://royalaero.com.au/
- Formerly called: The Aero Club of New South Wales (1929-1935); Australian Aero Club NSW Section (1920-1929)

The Royal Aero Club of New South Wales (RACNSW) is a legacy aviation organisation, aero club, and certified flight training operator. Established in 1920 as NSW Section of the Australian Aero Club, it is one of Australia's oldest aviation organisations preceding both Qantas and the Royal Australian Air Force.

In 2023, the club was revived under new leadership and has since been described as the Southern Hemisphere's largest volunteer-run flying school, focused on youth training and mentorship.

== History ==
Origins of the RACNSW trace back to October 1914 when young officers from the Australian Flying Corps assembled in Point Cook, Victoria. This meeting saw the establishment of the Australian Aero Club (AAC) which became affiliated with the Royal Aero Club of Great Britain. World War 1 interrupted the AAC's development however following the war the idea of a dedicated New South Wales Section emerged.

On 23 May 1919 a meeting was held at Royal Society House in Sydney’s CBD where the club's foundation was laid. Colonel Oswald Watt, a decorated World War 1 aviator who was recognised for bravery in the skies of France during World War 1 was elected inaugural president. Under Watt's leadership the NSW Section of the Australian Aero Club received its Certificate of Incorporation on 10 November 1920.

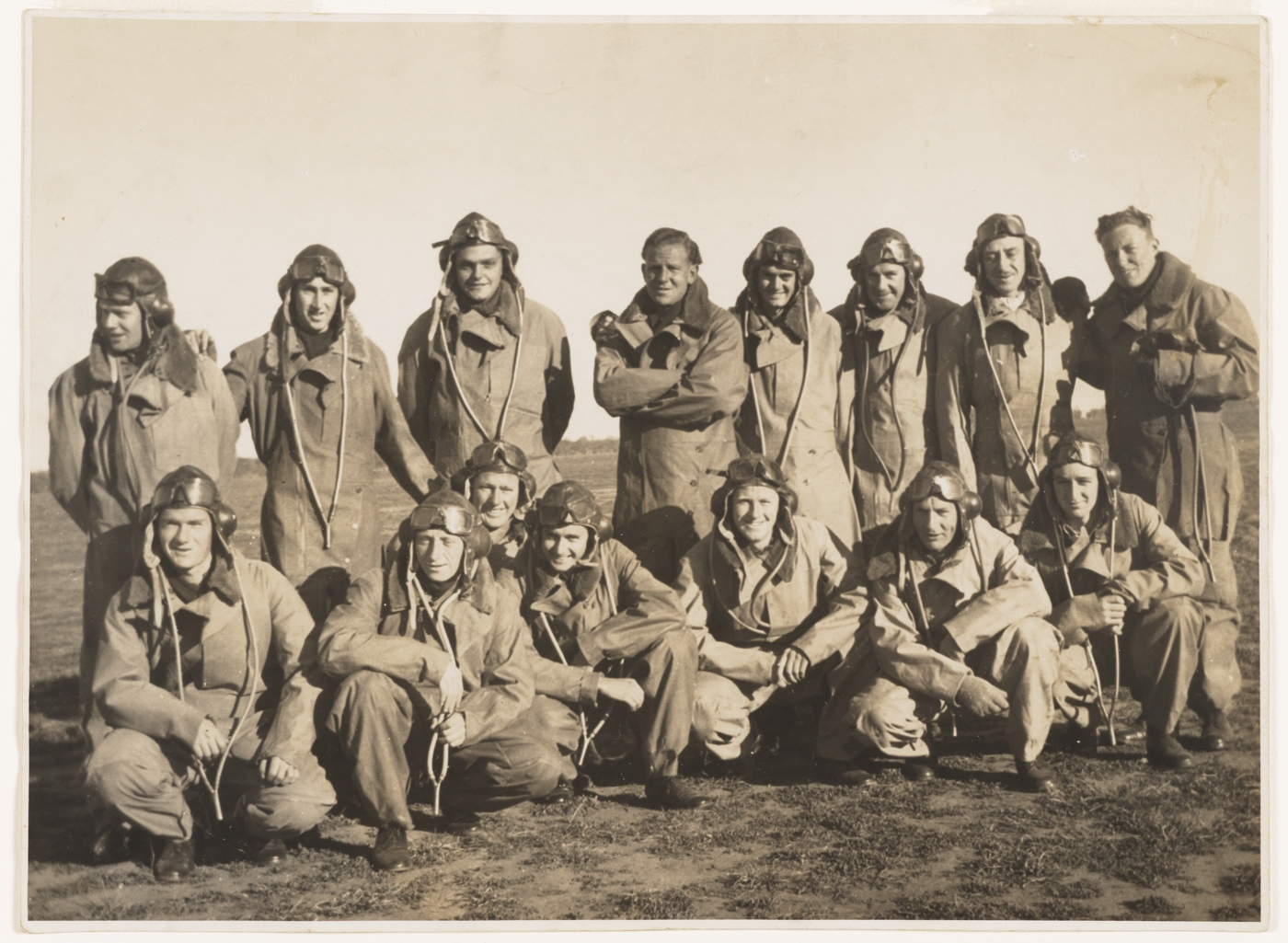
Photograph of RACNSW members at Mascot Aerodrome, circa. late 1920s

In 1926, the Department of Aviation approached the RACNSW with a proposal to establish a flight training organisation. Under this arrangement, the club organised and maintained flight training operations and in return received three de Havilland DH.60 Cirrus Moths with the first aircraft arriving in July that same year at Mascot Aerodrome.

During the late 1920s, the RACNSW bought land at Warwick Farm (a suburb near Liverpool in South Western Sydney) to create a 'Flying Country Club'. The Sydney Morning Herald reported that over 70 acres were cleared for the club, with well-prepared landing grounds and runways. This site was named Hargrave Park Aerodrome and officially opened in September 1930 with over 20,000 attendees including the Governor of New South Wales, Sir Phillip Game.

By 1935, the RACNSW had established itself as a pioneering force in aviation and was honoured by King George V who granted the prefix 'Royal'. Consequently, the club adopted the title of the Royal Aero Club of New South Wales.

With the onset of World War II in 1939, the club like many other flight training organisations redirected its resources to support the war effort. It played a vital role in providing skilled instructors, aircraft, and maintenance facilities to train aspiring cadets for the Royal Australian Air Force. In 1944, Hargrave Park Aerodrome was also taken over by the British Navy as HMS Golden Hind.

Following the war and as the Jet Age emerged and Mascot evolved into Sydney's International Airport, the Department of Civil Aviation instructed the club to move to Bankstown Aerodrome. In 1949, the club relocated to the former Royal Australian Air Force hospital premises, with the official opening conducted by the Patron and Governor of New South Wales, Sir John Northcott.

During this transition, the club's aircraft fleet evolved significantly shifting from de Havilland Tiger Moths to de Havilland Chipmunks and later adopting Piper Aircraft including Comanches and Tri-Pacers.

The late 1980s saw the RACNSW face significant challenges with financial difficulties arising which ultimately saw the club placed into receivership during the 1990s.

== Revival ==
After a period of inactivity during the 1990s and early 2000s, the Royal Aero Club of New South Wales was re-established in 2023 by a group of volunteers under the leadership of Lachlan Hyde with the aim of carrying forward the club's legacy. The revitalised organisation is based at Camden Airport and operates as a volunteer-run, not-for-profit Part 141 Flight Training Organisation which has grown to be the largest in the Southern Hemisphere.

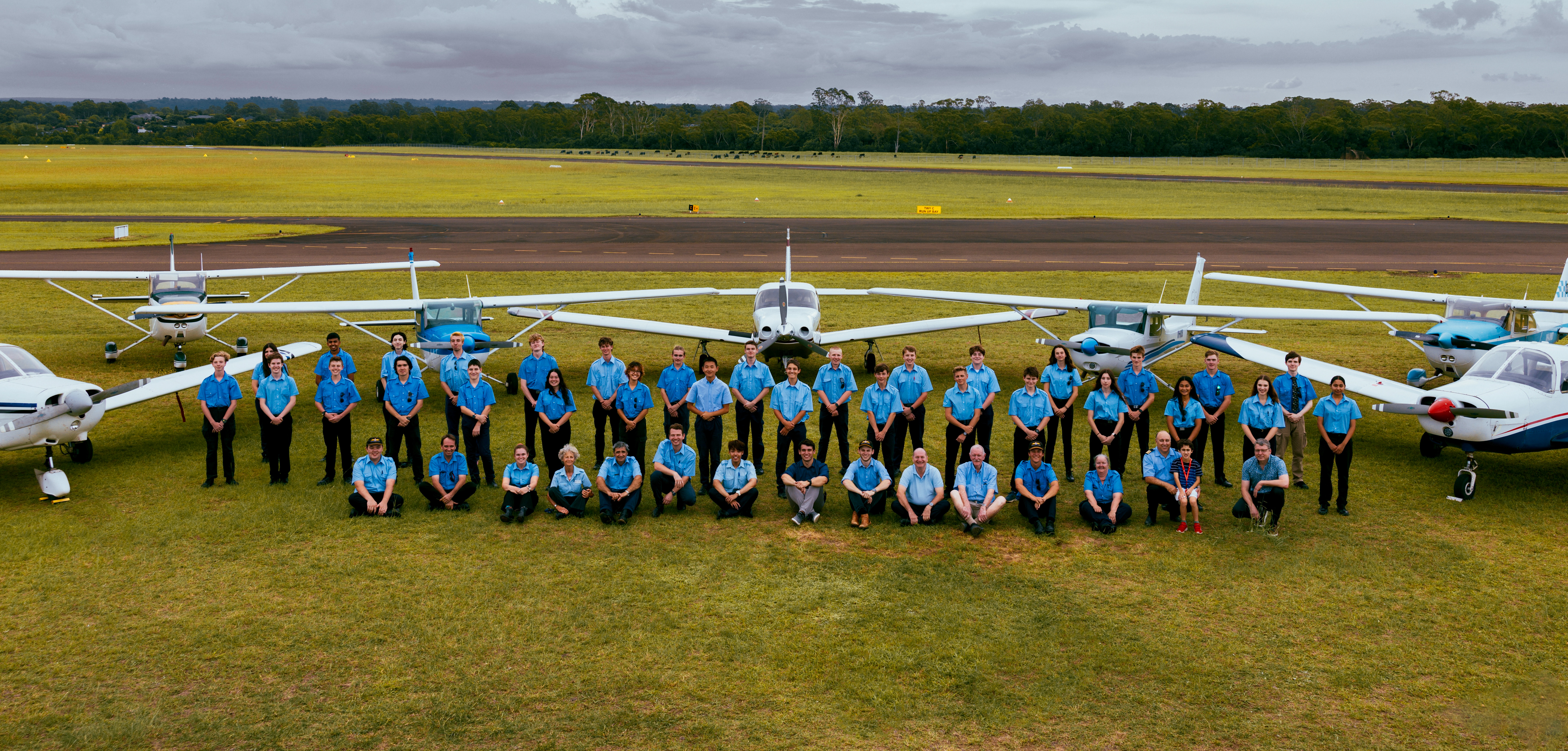
Student pilots, volunteer staff, and flying instructors at the 2024 Flying Training Camp.

In early 2024, the Civil Aviation Safety Authority issued the club with their Part 141 Flight Training Approvals allowing the RACNSW to conduct training for Recreational, Private, and Commercial Pilot Licences, as well as operational ratings, and other training. January of that same year, the club held its first residential Flying Training Camp, bringing together 34 student pilots from across New South Wales and the Australian Capital Territory, 15 volunteer instructors and 7 aircraft, which collectively logged over 200 flight hours across 9 days.

Although the re-established club does not yet own aircraft, several members have made their privately owned aircraft available for training and hire, including two Cessna 152s, two Piper PA-28 Warriors and a Piper PA-32 Saratoga.

== Awards and recognition ==
In 2025, the Royal Aero Club of New South Wales was named "Aero Club of the Year" by the Civil Aviation Safety Authority in their annual Wings Awards. The award was presented by CASA Chair, Air Chief Marshall Mark Binskin AC (retd) to club president Lachlan Hyde during a ceremony at the Australian International Airshow in Avalon, Victoria. The recognition highlighted the club's renewed training initiatives, including its residential flying training camp for teenagers and introductory "Try-and-Fly" weekends.

That same year the club and its members were national finalists in three categories at the Australian Aviation Awards, with Kayla Bentley (Professional Pilot of the Year), Elliot Powell (Recreational Pilot of the Year), and the club itself (Training and Mentorship Program of the Year) all recognised among the finalists.

== Notable members ==
The Royal Aero Club of New South Wales has had many well-known members over the years, including:

- Sir Charles Kingsford Smith
- Nancy Bird Walton
- Charles Ulm
- Hudson Fysh
- Sydney de Kantzow
- Oswald Watt
- Jerry Pentland
- Guy Menzies
- Denzil MacArthur Onslow
- Clive Caldwell
- Nancy Ellis
- Florence Mary Taylor
- Geoffrey Forrest Hughes

== Aircraft fleet ==
=== Current fleet ===
- Cessna 152: VH-HCC and VH-HUZ
- Piper PA28: VH-PCN and VH-UNL
- Piper PA32: VH-EXS
