= Transpacific crossing =

Crossings across the Pacific Ocean

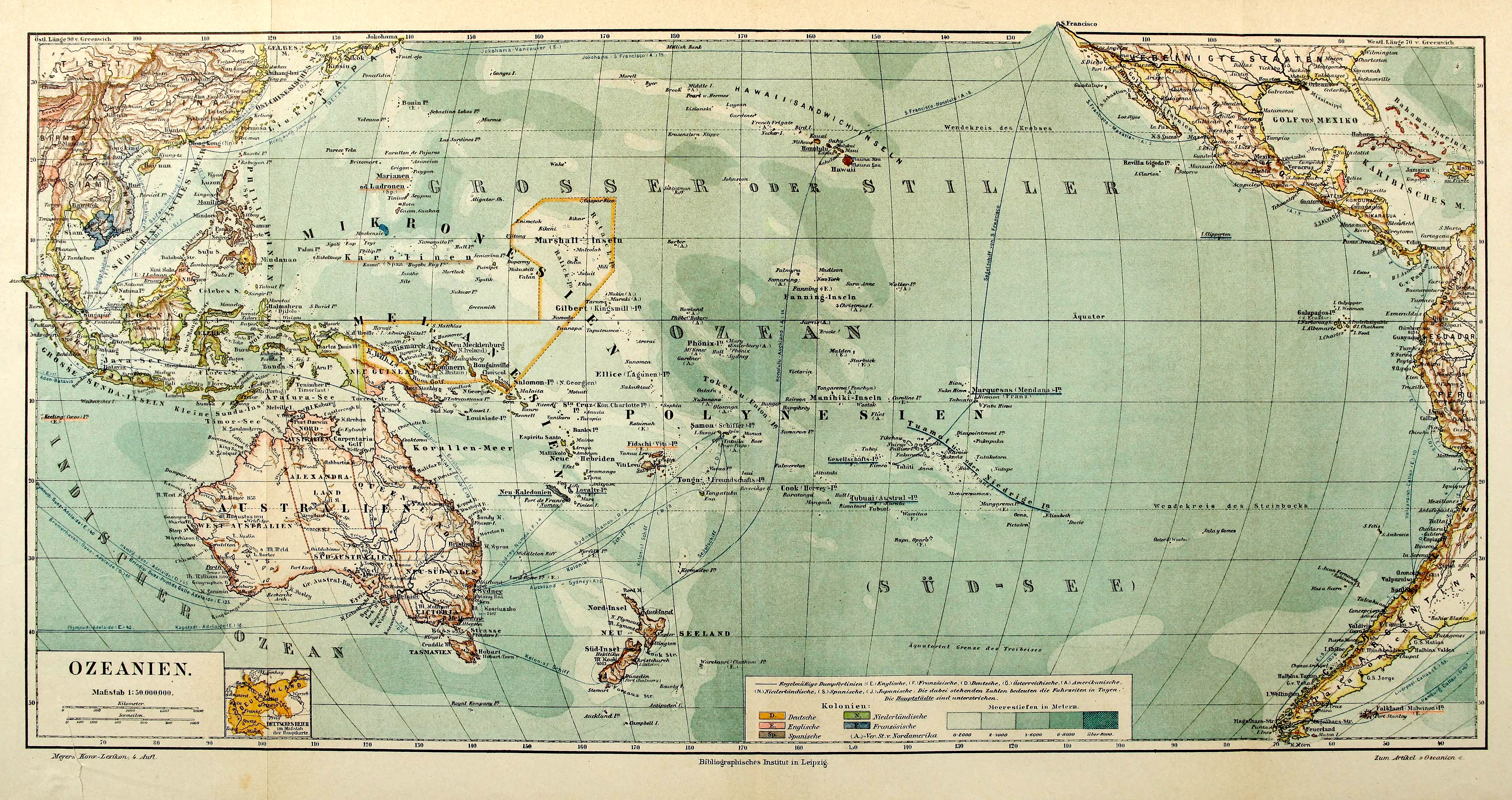
Map of Oceania, showing regular steamer lines. From the Meyers Konversations-Lexikon, Leipzig, c. 1890.

Transpacific crossings are voyages of passengers and cargo across the Pacific Ocean between Asia, Oceania, and the Americas. Transpacific voyages frequently cross the International Date Line. The first recorded crossing of the Pacific was achieved by Spain's historic Magellan expedition in March 1521. Commercial transpacific flights have been available since 1935.

== History ==
The Spanish expedition of the Portuguese explorer Magellan was the first to cross the Pacific in 1521 and the one to give the ocean its name. After discovering and crossing the Strait of Magellan in November 1520, the expedition sailed northwest across the Pacific for over three months and reached the Philippines in March 1521. Juan Sebastian Elcano would continue the expedition to complete the first world circumnavigation in 1522. The first navigator to cross the Pacific from east to west was Andres de Urdaneta, who discovered the easterly route across the Pacific from the Philippines to Mexico in 1565.

The first transpacific trade route in history was the Spanish Manila galleon route which lasted from 1565 to 1815 and followed navigator Andres de Urdaneta's discovery of the easterly route or tornaviaje in 1565. It ended two and a half centuries later, when most Pacific ports became open to world trade.

Other early transpacific voyages include those of Spanish navigators García Jofre de Loaísa in 1526, Álvaro de Saavedra Cerón in 1527, Alvaro de Mendaña in 1567 and 1595, and Pedro Fernandes de Queirós in 1606. Another early navigator to cross the Pacific from Asia to the Americas was Francisco Gali who completed this journey in 1584.

In the 19th century, the first liners built specially for the transpacific ocean service were the "Empress" vessels of the Canadian Pacific Railway. After the railway reached the Pacific seaboard in 1885, the liners began operation in 1891.

In 1928, Charles Kingsford Smith and his crew were the first to cross the Pacific by flight. Smith and Australian aviator, Charles Ulm, arrived in the United States and began to search for an aircraft. Famed Australian polar explorer Sir Hubert Wilkins sold them a Fokker F.VII/3m monoplane, which they named the Southern Cross. Ulm was the relief pilot. The other crewmen were Americans, they were James Warner, the radio operator, and Captain Harry Lyon, the navigator and engineer.

In 1935, the beginning of commercial transpacific flights to and from California began operation. On November 22, 1935, "Pan American Airlines' China Clipper launched its first transpacific flight, covering a distance of 8,000 miles". The route was ready for passenger service by October 1936.

Between March and April 2019, the blind sailor Matsuhiro Iwamoto of Japan and Doug Smith of the United States sailed from San Diego, United States to Fukushima, Japan, making Iwamoto the first blind sailor to cross the Pacific non-stop. Iwamoto's first attempt in 2013 failed when his boat hit a whale.

== See also ==
- Transpacific flight
- Exploration of the Pacific
- Asia-Pacific
- Pre-Columbian trans-oceanic contact theories
