= A Thousand Skies =

- Genre: Miniseries
- Based on: The Empty Sky by Tasman Beattie
- Written by: David Stevens
- Directed by: David Stevens
- Starring: John Walton; Andrew Clarke; Joss McWilliam
- Composer: Bruce Smeaton
- Country of origin: Australia
- Original language: English
- No. of episodes: 3

Production
- Producers: Ross Dimsey; Robert Ginn
- Camera setup: David Eggby
- Running time: 3 x 2 hours
- Production company: A Thousand Skies Company

Original release
- Network: Seven Network
- Release: 9 October – 23 October 1985

A Thousand Skies is a 1985 Australian miniseries about the life of aviator Sir Charles Kingsford Smith and based on the novel The Empty Sky by Tasman Beattie.

== Synopsis ==
The miniseries charts the life of adventurous aviation pioneer Charles Kingsford Smith, from his WWI service and time in Hollywood as a stunt flyer, to his first pilot job at Australian Airlines in 1924, and his ambition to fly over the Pacific.

During a period when aircraft were very primitive and flying remained extremely dangerous, Smith (known as 'Smithy') – together with fellow aviator Charles ‘Charlie’ Ulm – constantly risks his life in pursuit of his aviation dreams, including being forced to land his plane, the Southern Cross in the North Australian wilderness when attempting a record flight to England.

Additionally, the pair face stiff competition and financial difficulties, but they persevere and continue to undertake increasingly ambitious flights, eventually completing a grueling 84 hour flight, battling storms, hurricanes and useless instruments along the way. A huge crowd turns out to greet their successful arrival in Sydney, and they begin to attract international recognition. But eventually their luck runs out.

== Cast ==
- John Walton as Charles Kingsford Smith
- Andrew Clarke as Charles Ulm
- Joss McWilliam as Keith Anderson
- Jane Menelaus as Thelma McKenna
- Geoff Parry as Bob Hitchcock
- Celine O'Leary as Mary Powell-Kingsford Smith
- Helen Jones as Bon Hilliard
- Phyllis Burford as Kate Kingsford Smith
- Richard Hutson as William Kingsford Smith
- Judith Massey as Mrs. Hilliard
- Paul Karo as English director
- Harold Baigent as Swampy Dawkins
- Nick Holland as Bert Day
- Hardy Stow as Harry Lyon
- David Arnett as Jim Warner
- Denzil Howson as Mr. Hilliard
- Alan Fletcher as John Stannage
- David Frezza as Announcer in San Francisco
- Reg Gorman as Joe the Fireman
- Tim Robertson as Jack Lang
- Alex Menglet as Antony Fokker
- Ric Hutton as Chairman
- Mark Mitchell as Hotel Receptionist in San Francisco

== Production ==
Writer-director David Stevens, best known for directing 1981 miniseries A Town Like Alice, was reluctant to make the miniseries, when it was first offered to him. He changed his mind after subsequently reading The Empty Sky, upon which he became intrigued by the character of Keith Anderson. Stevens said: "It is about the nature of greatness and the nature of friendship. It is also a love story – an eternal triangle between three men.

With a budget of $4.5 million, the miniseries was partly financed by Film Victoria, who invested $120,000 in script development and $400,000 to the production. The series was shot at 144 different locations, but the only sets built were the planes, which cost $500,000.

== Reception ==
The Age called the miniseries "emotionally unvinvolving" but said "the series is well worth pursuing." Another reviewer from the same paper called it "television excellence".

John Ulm, son of ill-fated aviator Charles Ulm, in a review for Aircraft magazine (a publication for The Civil Aviation Historical Society & Airways Museum) wrote: “Good yarn speckled with errors”, indicating that the story had some inaccuracies.

The series only rated in the low twenties.
