= Transpacific flight =

Flight of an aircraft across the Pacific Ocean

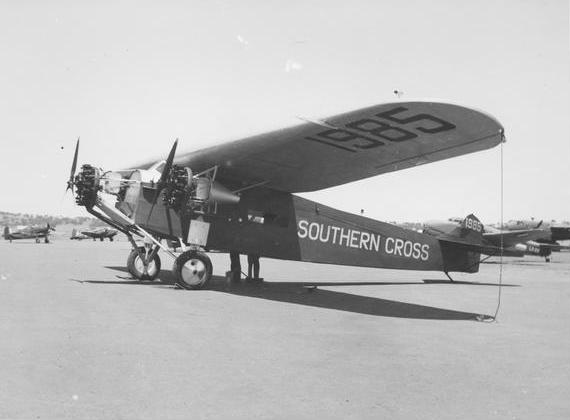
The Southern Cross at an RAAF base near Canberra in 1943.

A transpacific flight is the flight of an aircraft across the Pacific Ocean from Australasia, East and Southeast Asia to North America, South America, or vice versa. Such flights have been made by fixed-wing aircraft, balloons and other types of aircraft.

Though less common than transatlantic flights, transpacific flights have been commercially available since the mid-1930s and have been used for transport of cargo and passengers across the Pacific Ocean. The time and distance of transpacific flights are longer than transatlantic flights, thanks to the much broader width of the Pacific. The first transpacific flight occurred in 1928, nine years after the first transatlantic flight in 1919.

== History ==
In 1927, Ernie Smith and Emory Bronte attempted the first civilian transpacific flight bound for Maui, Hawaii starting from Oakland, California. The duo "flew 25 hours and two minutes at 6,000 feet (1,800 m) in a single-engine Travel Air 5000 monoplane, but ran out of fuel and safely crash-landed on Molokai". A memorial was constructed to mark "the historic end to the first civilian transpacific flight".

=== First transpacific flight ===
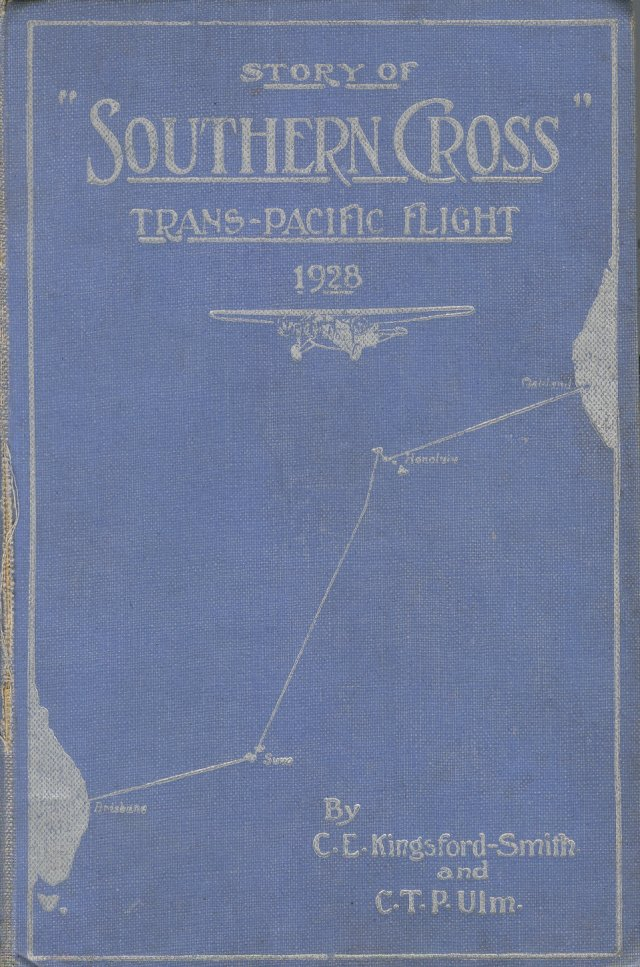
Route, shown on first edition cover of descriptive book of the flight

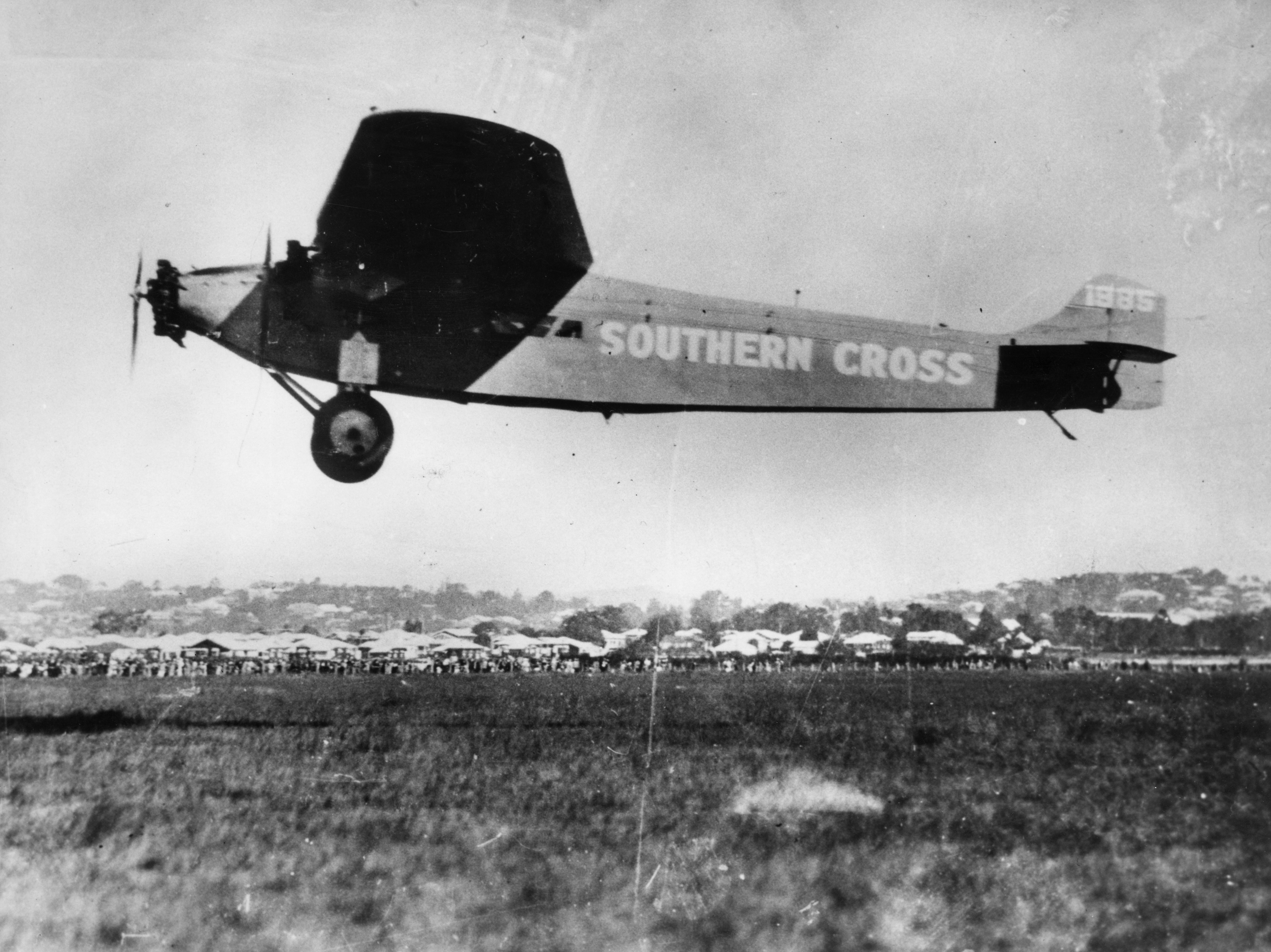
Southern Cross 1928

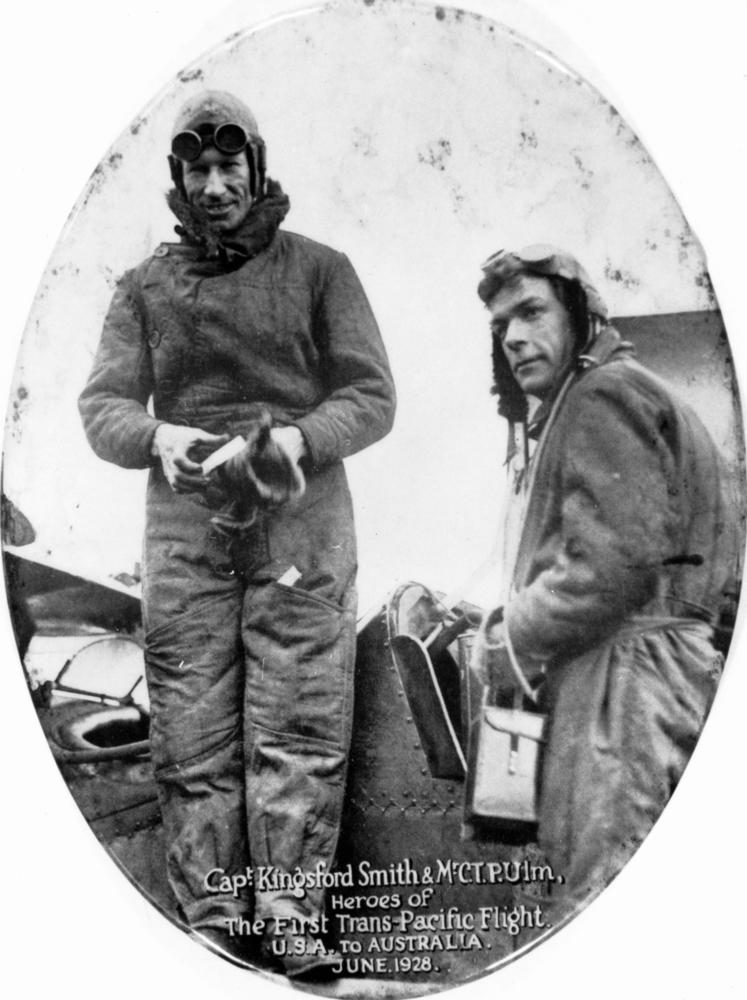
A photograph commemorating the first trans-Pacific flight.

In 1928, Australian aviator Charles Kingsford Smith and his crew were the first to cross the Pacific by air. Smith and his relief pilot, fellow Australian Charles Ulm, arrived in the United States and began to search for an aircraft. Famed Australian polar explorer Sir Hubert Wilkins sold them a Fokker F.VII/3m monoplane, which they named the Southern Cross.

At 8:54 a.m. on 31 May 1928, Kingsford Smith and his crew left Oakland, California, to attempt the first trans-Pacific flight to Australia. The flight was in three stages. The first, from Oakland to Wheeler Army Airfield, Hawaii, was 3,870 kilometres (2,400 mi), taking an uneventful 27 hours 25 minutes (87.54 mph). They took off from Barking Sands on Mana, Kauai, since the runway at Wheeler was not long enough. They headed for Suva, Fiji, 5,077 kilometres (3,155 mi) away, taking 34 hours 30 minutes (91.45 mph). This was the most demanding portion of the journey, as they flew through a massive lightning storm near the equator. The third leg was the shortest, 2,709 kilometres (1,683 mi) in 20 hours (84.15 mph), and crossed the Australian coastline near Ballina before turning north to fly 170 kilometres (110 mi) to Brisbane, where they landed at 10:50 a.m. on 9 June. The total flight distance was approximately 11,566 kilometres (7,187 mi). Kingsford Smith was met by a huge crowd of 26,000 at Eagle Farm Airport, and was welcomed as a hero. While Australians Kingsford Smith (main) and Ulm (relief) were the pilots, the other two crewmen were Americans, radio operator James Warner, and Captain Harry Lyon, who was navigator and engineer.

The National Film and Sound Archive of Australia has a film biography of Kingsford Smith, called An Airman Remembers, and recordings of Kingsford Smith and Ulm talking about the journey.

=== Kingsford Smith's second flight ===
In early November 1934, Smith undertook a second transpacific flight. The 1928 transpacific flight took 27 hours and 28 minutes and his 1934 flight took 14 hours and 59 minutes. By this point seven pilots, one of them a woman, had died attempting transpacific flights.

=== First non-stop flight ===
On 5 October 1931, Clyde Pangborn, with co-pilot Hugh Herndon Jr, while piloting a Bellanca called Miss Veedol, crash-landed the plane in the hills of East Wenatchee, Washington, in the central part of the state, becoming the first people to fly non-stop across the northern Pacific Ocean. The 41-hour flight from Sabishiro Beach, Misawa, Aomori Prefecture, Japan, won them the 1931 Harmon Trophy, which symbolized the greatest achievement in flight for that year. The plane was "heavily modified to carry 930 US gallons (3,500 L) of fuel" and made without landing gear to save fuel.

=== Other attempts ===
In July 1929, Harold Bromley attempted to fly from Tacoma, Washington to Tokyo, Japan in an orange Lockheed Vega monoplane purchased by lumberman John Buffelen, who raised $25,000 to acquire the plane. The gasoline tanks were overfilled causing gasoline to pour onto the windshield and into Bromley's goggles temporarily blinding him. The plane crashed by the runway, Bromley was unhurt and would later try again to cross the Pacific Ocean.

== Commercial flights ==
In 1935, the beginning of commercial transpacific flights to and from California began operation. On 22 November 1935, "Pan American Airlines' China Clipper launched its first transpacific flight, covering a distance of 8,000 miles (13,000 km)". A large "Martin M-130 seaplane departed from Alameda, in the Bay Area, and island-hopped to Oahu, Midway Island, Wake Island, Guam, and the Philippines before arriving in Canton, China, with a cargo of mail". A year later, passenger flights using the same route were inaugurated by Pan American. California became the undisputed national leader of transpacific flights. For the next year, Pan American planned for passenger flights, the China Clipper and its sister ships, the Philippine Clipper and Hawaii Clipper, focused on cargo transport including mail across the Pacific during this time. The route was ready for passenger service by October 1936.

== Records ==
In November 1981, the first successful transpacific balloon crossing was made in the balloon Double Eagle V. It launched from Nagashima, Japan on November 10, 1981, and landed in Mendocino National Forest in California 84 hours and 31 minutes later, covering a record 9,283 kilometres (5,768 mi). The four-man crew consisted of Albuquerque balloonists Ben Abruzzo, Larry Newman, and Ron Clark, and thrill-seeking restaurateur Rocky Aoki, who helped fund the flight. After crossing the Pacific the helium-filled Double Eagle V, weighed down by ice and buffeted by a storm, crash-landed in northern California, ending the nearly 10,000-kilometre (6,000 mi) flight. No one was hurt.

On February 21, 1995, aviator Steve Fossett was the first person to make a solo flight across the Pacific Ocean in a balloon from South Korea to Leader, Saskatchewan.

On 25 January 2015, pilots Troy Bradley and Leonid Tiukhtyaev flying the Two Eagles Balloon, surpassed the Double Eagle II duration record and Double Eagle V distance record after traveling 9,777 kilometres (6,075 mi) across the Pacific.

In 2015 and 2016, Solar Impulse 2 made a transpacific crossing while attempting to circumnavigate the world. The plane landed in Mountain View, California after three days of continuous flying from Hawaii. The pilots only slept 20 minutes at a time, and the plane's cockpit had no heating or air conditioning. The plane was piloted by two Swiss pilots: Bertrand Piccard, a psychiatrist, and André Borschberg, an engineer and entrepreneur.

== See also ==
- Transpacific crossing
- Transatlantic crossing
- Transatlantic flight
