= Guy Menzies =

Australian aviator (1909–1940)

Squadron Leader Guy Menzies
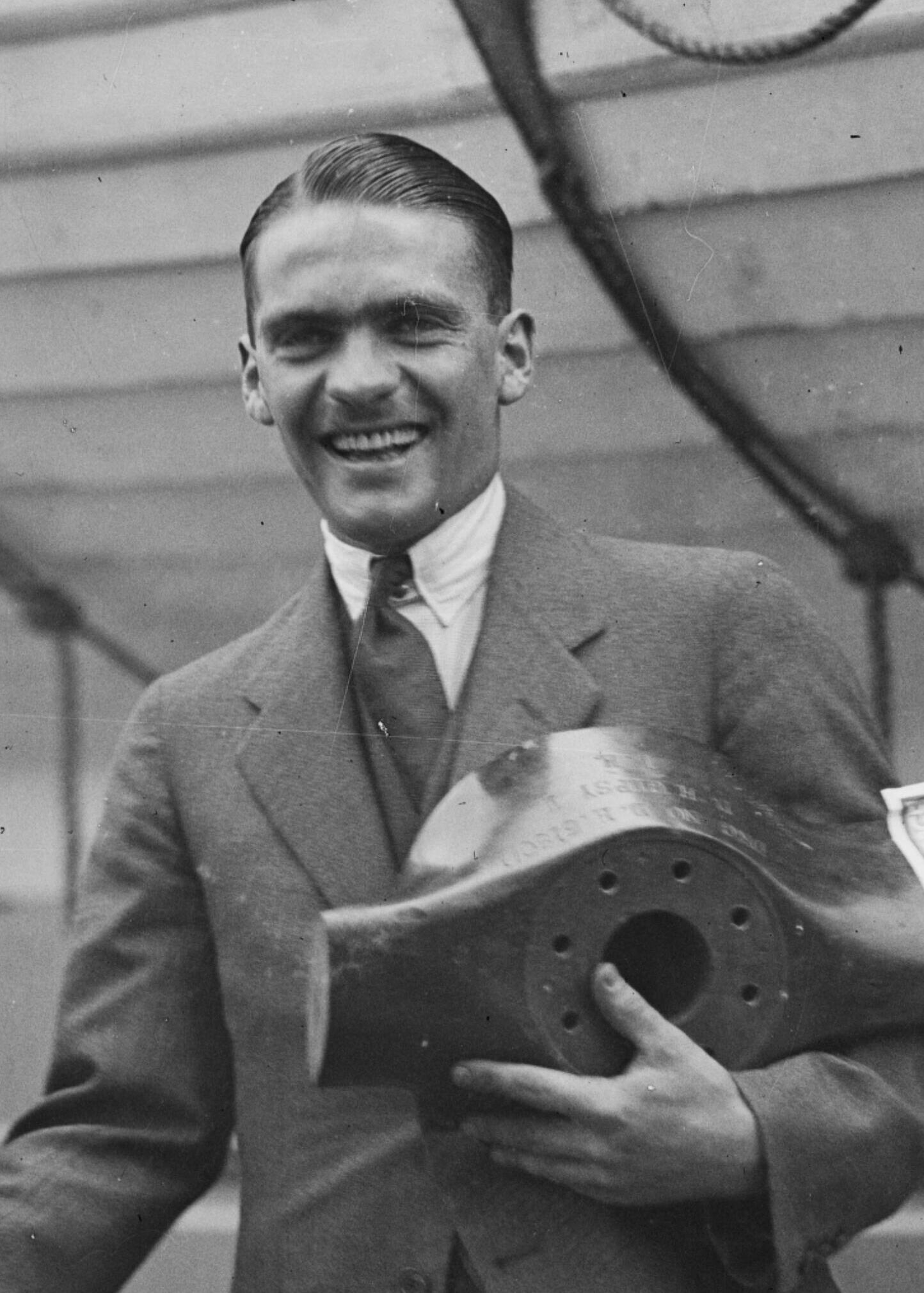
- Menzies in 1931 with the damaged propeller of Southern Cross Junior
- Born: Guy Lambton Menzies; 20 August 1909; Drummoyne, New South Wales, Australia
- Died: 1 November 1940 (aged 31); Mediterranean Sea
- Military career
- Allegiance: Australia
- Branch: Royal Air Force
- Service years: 1939–40
- Rank: Squadron Leader
- Service number: 32061
- Unit: No. 228 Squadron RAF
- Conflicts: Second World War

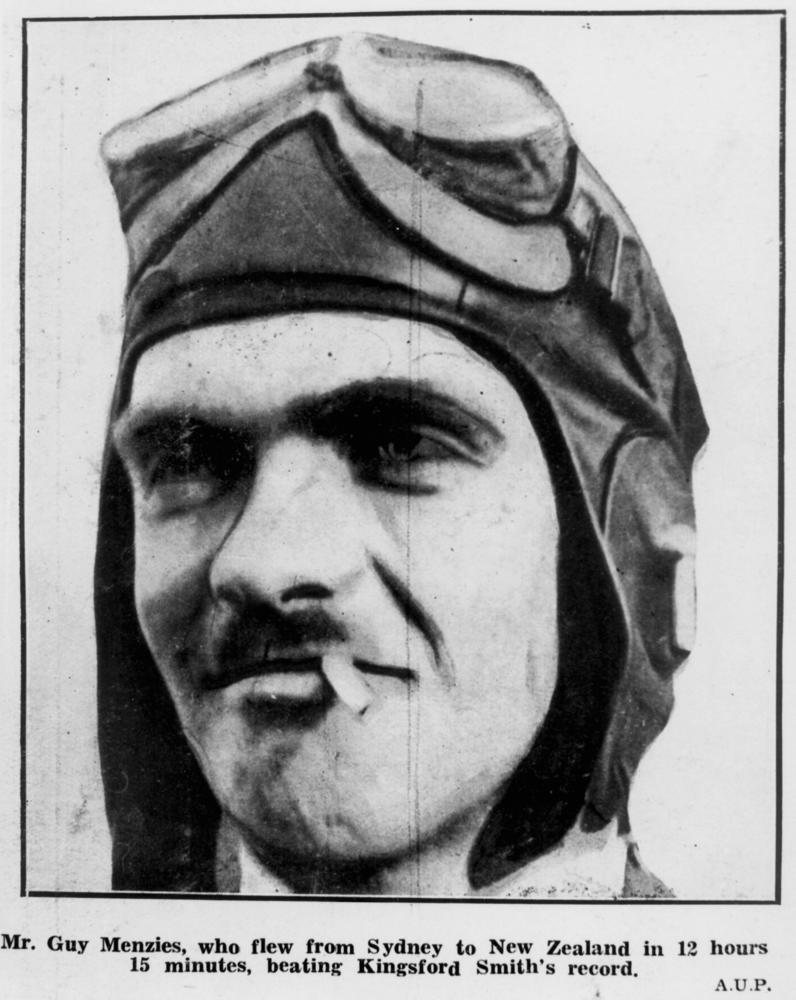
Menzies, c. 1931

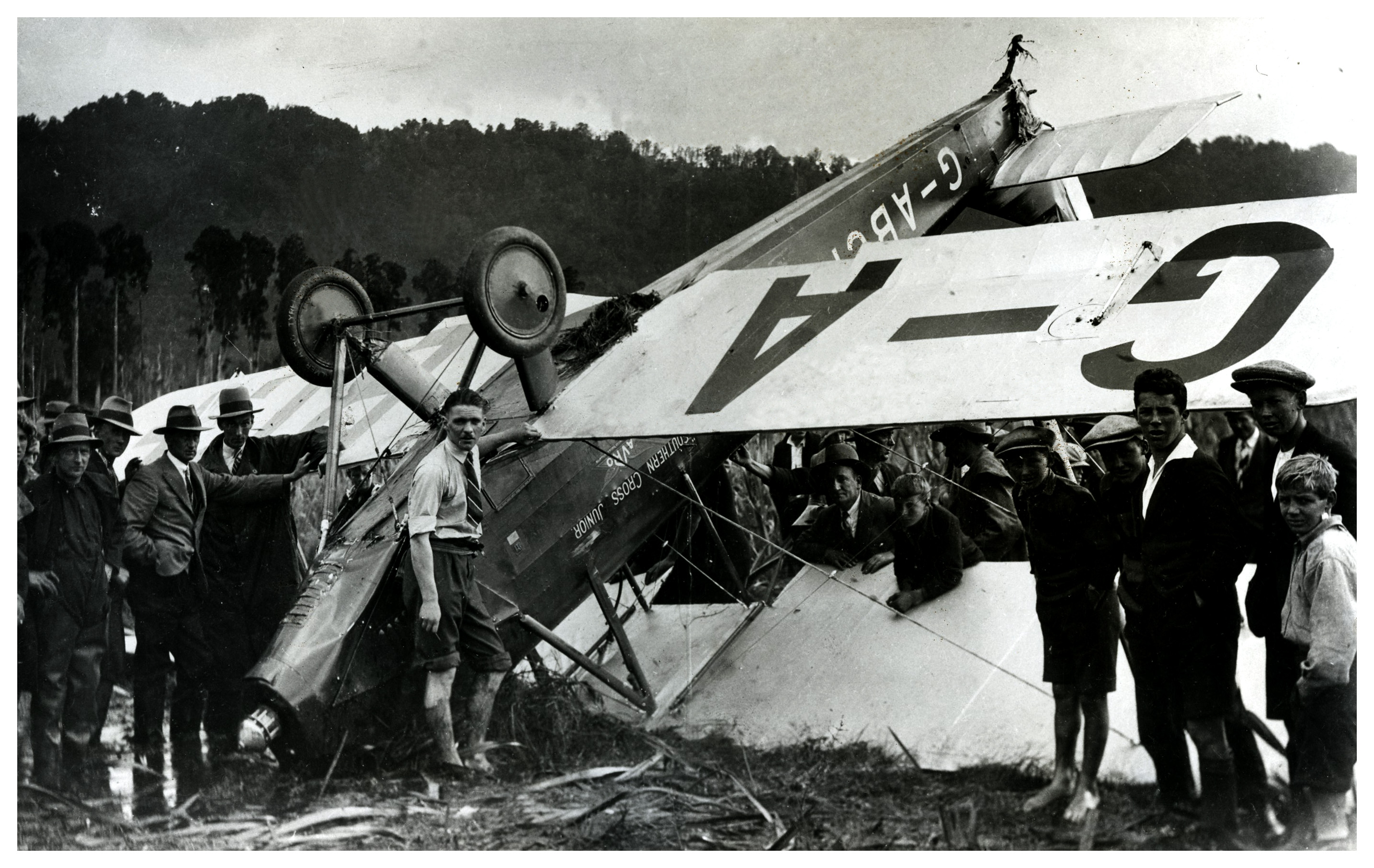
On 7 January 1931 Australian aviator Guy Menzies crash landed in the La Fontaine Swamp, near Hari Hari on the West Coast of New Zealand

Guy Lambton Menzies (20 August 1909 – 1 November 1940) was an Australian aviator who flew the first solo trans-Tasman flight, from Sydney, Australia, to the West Coast of New Zealand, on 7 January 1931.

== Family ==
The (Modern) Wild Colonial Boy.
T. the R.

"At 12.30 a.m. the young aviator glanced at his
watch. ‘I think we will make a start now',’ he said.
....A little after 2.30 p.m. word came through
that he had landed safely at Harihari, which is
close to Herepo."

There was a Wild Colonial Boy,
Guy Menzies was his name,
He cut it in a single day
Deep on the scroll of Fame.
At midnight he was all unknown;
At twenty-five to three
P.M. (New Zealand time) he’d flown
Magnificently on his own
Across the Tasman Sea.
By wire and beam the news they switch,
They flash it to and fro:
"He’s safe at Harihari, which
Is close to Herepo."

There was a Wild Colonial Boy
Some ham and eggs who scoffed
Within an unpretentious joint,
Then coolly sailed aloft.
They deemed the youngster westward-bound;
He scarce was out of sight
Before the ’wildered watchers found
He wouldn’t overland around
The Great Australian Bight.
’Twas east-south-east without a hitch
Till wireless shrilled "Hello!
He’s safe at Harihari, which
Is close to Herepo."

There was a Wild Colonial Boy,
Just old enough to vote,
A name to go with Kingsford Smith’s
Indelibly who wrote.
Then give the lad with Lindbergh place,
And eke with Amy J.,
Who rose—a deuce—and lit—an ace,
From shore to shore within the space
Of half a summer’s day.
The moon at Mascot, round and rich,
Beams on him, rising from the pitch,
And ere the sun is low
He’s safe at Harihari, which
Is close to Herepo.

— The Bulletin, 14 January 1931.

The eldest of the five children of the medical practitioner Guy Dixon Menzies (1873–1947), and Ida Mabel Menzies MBE, née Lambton (1881–1975), Guy Lambton Menzies was born at Drummoyne, New South Wales, on 20 August 1909.

=== Siblings ===
His younger brother, Ian Lambton Menzies (1912–1941), who served in the RAAF, died on 18 April 1941 in an aircraft accident near Ravenswood, Queensland, and about 100 kilometers south of Townsville.

Guy's other three siblings were: Betty Lambton Menzies (1915–1980), later Mrs. William A. Horsley, medical practitioner Bruce Lambton Menzies (1917–2021), and Kathleen Audrey Lambton Menzies (born 1921), later Mrs. Joseph S. Henderson.

=== Marriage ===
Menzies married Mrs. Marcia Ina Grundy (born 1909), née Leslie, in London, on 12 April 1940.

Connolly (2017b) reveals that the 'true story' behind the "mysterious injuries" that Menzies sustained while serving at North Weald and reported in the 1936 press, were that—rather than receiving 'head injuries' from a 12-metre (40 ft) fall from a window—the most significant of the injuries that he had sustained (which were "not wholly consistent with a fall") were two broken kneecaps, of such severity that it was thought for some considerable time that he would never be able to fly again. The injuries that Menzies sustained had been inflicted upon Menzies by, or on behalf of, "one of his fellow officers", Squadron-Leader E.M.F. Grundy (26046), later Air Marshal Sir Edouard Grundy, the "aggrieved husband" of Marcia, with whom Menzies was having an affair. This fact, according to Connolly, explains why the details of the secret, internal, RAF enquiries were never released to the public. According to Connolly, Marcia eventually divorced her husband, who had left England at some time before her marriage to Menzies, which took place some four years after Menzies had been assaulted.

Marcia, and her son Frederick Michael (born 1934), moved to Australia in 1946. Michael went on to join the RAAF.

== Education ==
Menzies was educated at the academically selective Fort Street High School in Sydney.

== Speedway ==
While still a teenager, Menzies was a well-performed dirt-track, concrete track, and speedway motorcycle rider who raced under the assumed name of Don McKay, and was billed as "The Flying Scotchman". A number of other Australian speedway riders, such as Dave Brewster, Ern Buck, Vic Huxley, Bill Kilminster, Charlie Spinks, and Lionel Van Praag also held pilot's licenses.

== First solo trans-Tasman flight ==
The first crossing of the Tasman by air had been achieved on 10–11 September 1928 by Charles Kingsford Smith and Charles Ulm in the Southern Cross.

Menzies had gained his pilot's license in 1929, and had flying experience.

The plane Menzies used for his solo crossing was the Avro Sports Avian that Smith had flown from England to Australia, the Southern Cross Junior.

Fearing he might be denied permission for the flight, Menzies informed the authorities and his family that he was flying to Perth. Instead, he left Sydney at 1 AM on 7 January 1931, and headed for Blenheim, New Zealand.

Poor weather forced Menzies off course, and after 11 hours and 45 minutes, with the high tides in the area removing any possibility of him making a safe emergency landing on a sandy beach, he crash-landed (at 3:12 PM local time) upside-down in the La Fontaine Swamp near Hari Hari on New Zealand's West Coast, which he had supposed was a meadow.

As soon as it became known that Menzies was heading for New Zealand, Colonel Horace C. Brinsmead - at the time Controller of Civil Aviation in Australia - dispatched a message to the Director of Air Services in the Defence Department in New Zealand. He asked for word about Menzies.
"Pilot G. L. Menzies left Sydney at 1 a.m. this morning flying solo in an Avro Avian aircraft G-ABCF with destination New Zealand. This department had no prior knowledge of Menzies’s proposal. I understand he had fuel for 18 hours’ flight. Appreciate earliest advice of news of his arrival in New Zealand."
The day after the successful flight Colonel Brinsmead’s New Zealand opposite number replied.
"Pilot Menzies made forced landing 20 miles south of Ross 3.12 p.m. yesterday. News of arrival and your cable arrived too late for early advice. Remarkable achievement but hope no more unheralded flights of this nature."
A note on the departmental file records the time of the flight as 12 hours 47 minutes. Leslie Jillett, in his book "Wings over [sic] the Tasman" gives the time as 12 hours 12 minutes and the aviator’s mother is reported to have said that his flying time was still half an hour less than that. — The Press, Tuesday, 13 July 1954.

Despite the unfortunate landing, Menzies had broken Smith and Ulm's time by 2½ hours.

=== Historical marker ===
An extensive outdoor historical marker with photographs and descriptions is located at GPS coordinates −43.076716, 170.531477 (south latitude, east longitude). The marker is approximately half a kilometre southwest of the actual landing spot (now on private land), which is marked by a pole with wind sock that are visible from the historical marker. News clippings and additional historical details are on display in the lobby of the Hotel Hari Hari, a few kilometres away on the State Highway 6.

== Royal Air Force service ==
Menzies joined the Royal Air Force in 1936, and served as a RAF squadron leader during the Second World War. He was part of the crew of one of the two Sunderlands that rescued the crew of the torpedoed Kensington Court on 18 September 1939.

== Death ==
Menzies and his crew were killed on 1 November 1940, when his Short Sunderland flying boat (N9020) was shot down over the Mediterranean Sea by Italian fighter aircraft while en route from Malta to Sicily. No remains of the aircraft or crew were ever found.

=== Commemoration ===
Menzies is commemorated at the Alamein Memorial in Egypt.

== 75th anniversary ==
On 7 January 2006, celebrations were held in Hari Hari to commemorate the 75th anniversary of Menzies's trans-Tasman voyage, and were marked by a re-enactment of the flight by adventurer Dick Smith. He landed at what was dubbed "Hari Hari International Airport".
