= Kangaroo (1986 film) =

- DVD cover
- Directed by: Tim Burstall
- Written by: Evan Jones
- Based on: novel by D. H. Lawrence
- Produced by: Ross Dimsey
- Starring: Colin Friels; Judy Davis; John Walton
- Cinematography: Dan Burstall
- Edited by: Edward McQueen-Mason
- Music by: Nathan Waks
- Distributed by: Cineplex Odeon Films
- Release date: 19 June 1986 (Melbourne)
- Running time: 110 minutes
- Country: Australia
- Language: English
- Budget: A$4.5 million or $3.3 million
- Box office: A$63,973 (Australia)

Kangaroo is a 1986 Australian drama film directed by Tim Burstall and starring Colin Friels, Judy Davis, and John Walton. It is based on the 1923 novel of the same name by D. H. Lawrence.

== Premise ==
In 1922, an English writer (Colin Friels) migrates to Australia with his wife (Judy Davis). There he resists joining both a paramilitary group and a socialist group, is caught in a riot, sees a death and loses love and friendship.

== Cast ==
- Colin Friels as Richard Somers
- Judy Davis as Harriet Somers
- John Walton as Jack Calcott
- Julie Nihill as Vicki Calcott
- Hugh Keays-Byrne as Kangaroo
- Peter Hehir as Jaz
- Peter Cummins as Struthers
- Tim Robertson as O'Neill
- Malcolm Robertson as Publisher
- David Hutchins as Cornwall Detective
- Kerry Bannister as nurse

== Production ==
In 1972, it was announced the novel would be filmed starring Dirk Bogarde but this did not eventuate. In 1981, Tim Burstall announced he would make the film and he had Leo McKern lined up to play Kangaroo and Bryan Brown and Olivia Newton-John to play the husband and wife.

The film was not made. He managed to do it several years later, by which time he felt McKern was too old and instead cast Hugh Keays-Byrne. He commissioned Evan Jones to adapt the script because he felt it needed an English writer.

Filming was conducted in Melbourne, Australia and went from 21 October to 14 December 1985.

== Distribution ==
It premiered as the opening film of the Melbourne International Film Festival on 19 June 1986, and was screened the following day as the closing film of the Sydney Film Festival.

It had various other film festival screenings, including at the 1986 Toronto International Film Festival, before going into commercial release in 1987.

== Awards ==
The film was nominated for two awards in the 1986 AFI Awards and also won in the Best Achievement in Best Actress in a Lead Role (Judy Davis) and Costume Design (Terry Ryan) categories. It was entered into the 15th Moscow International Film Festival.

== Home video ==
After the film's 1987 U.S. theatrical run, the film was released on videocassette and laserdisc by MCA Home Video. The film was released through Australia-based Umbrella Entertainment on 8 January 2010 as an all-region PAL disc.

The film is rated R13 in New Zealand.

== Box office ==
Kangaroo grossed $68,978 at the box office in Australia.

== See also ==
- Cinema of Australia
