= Geoff Parry =

Australian former actor (born 1953)

Geoff Parry (born 1953) is an Australian former actor. He is best known for his role as Bubba Zanetti, the blonde lieutenant of the motorcycle gang, in Mad Max. He has also been credited as Geoff Perry.

== Partial filmography ==
- Division 4 (1973–1975, TV Series) – Simon Smith / Bill Trent / Sammy James / Mike Collins / Ian Kruger / Cyril White
- Rush (1974, TV Series) – Bennett
- Chopper Squad (1978, TV Series) – Brian Jarvis
- Mad Max (1979) – Bubba Zanetti
- Gallipoli (1981) – Sgt. Sayers
- Women of the Sun (1982, TV Mini-Series) – Mr. Watson
- The Clinic (1982) – Charlie
- Prisoner (1980–1983, TV Series) – George Goscombe / Thug
- Melvin, Son of Alvin (1984) – Science teacher
- A Thousand Skies (1985, TV Mini-Series) – Bob Hitchcock
- Anzacs (1985, 5 part TV Mini-Series) – Field Marshal Sir Thomas Blamey
- Sword of Honour (1986, TV Mini-Series) – Major Sincock
- Death of a Soldier (1986) – GI at hanging
- The Big Hurt (1986) – Mr. Gregg
