= John Walton (actor) =

Australian actor

- Born: 1952; St Ives, New South Wales, Australia
- Died: 17 July 2014 (aged 62); Sydney, New South Wales, Australia
- Occupation: Actor

John Walton (1952 – 17 July 2014) was an Australian actor of stage, television, and film, best known for his roles in television soap operas The Young Doctors and The Sullivans.

== Early life ==
Walton was born in St Ives, New South Wales.

== Career ==
Walton appeared in a 1973 ABC TV play adaptation of The Taming of the Shrew. During a 1976 stage production of Much Ado About Nothing, he was spotted by Reg Grundy Productions' casting director Kerry Spence, and was subsequently cast for television soap opera The Young Doctors as Doctor Craig Rothwell, a role he played for two seasons, from 1976 to 1977.

Walton played Michael Watkins, the nephew of Ida Jessop (Vivean Gray), on Crawford Productions’ classic period drama The Sullivans, from episodes 239 to 433. His character wed Maggie Hayward (Vikki Hammond)'s daughter, Alice Morgan (Megan Williams), but it was not a happy marriage. His character was killed in a car accident, after throwing his mistress, Pamela Somers (Diane Craig) from the vehicle, saving her life. He went on to appear in further Crawford's series, including Cop Shop and Skyways.

Walton also appeared as Australian cricketer Bill Woodfull in the 1984 miniseries Bodyline, alongside Hugo Weaving and Gary Sweet, which dramatised the events of the 1932–1933 Ashes test cricket series. The following year, he played the lead role of Sir Charles Kingsford Smith in the biographical miniseries A Thousand Skies.

In 1986, Walton appeared as Jack Calcott in the film Kangaroo, opposite Judy Davis and Colin Friels and based on the novel by D.H. Lawrence. His performance saw him nominated for Best Supporting Actor at the Australian Film Institute Awards, an award that ultimately went to John Hargreaves for his role in Malcolm. The following year, Walton played the role of Tas in Australian war film The Lighthorsemen, alongside Peter Phelps, Bill Kerr and Sigrid Thornton.

Walton later completed a stint in Heartbreak High, playing the role of Albers' replacement, humanities teacher Nat Delaine, from season 6 (1997–1998). His other television credits include Cop Shop, Skyways, A Country Practice, Halifax f.p., McLeod's Daughters, All Saints, MDA and Blue Heelers. Walton's final screen credit was television drama Sea Patrol in 2009.

Walton also performed extensively for the stage, playing several lead characters including Shakespeare’s Hamlet, in productions of both Hamlet and Rosencrantz and Guildenstern are Dead (1979–1980). He worked for several of Australia's major theatre companies, including Melbourne Theatre Company, Sydney Theatre Company and Bell Shakespeare. From 1993 to 1994, he also toured nationally in a production of the musical South Pacific for the Gordon Frost Company.

== Awards ==
Year	Work	Award	Category	Result	Ref.
1986	Kangaroo	AFI Awards	Best Actor in a Supporting Role	Nominated	

== Filmography ==
=== Film ===
Year	Title	Role	Notes
1983	Undercover	Fred	Feature film
1986	Kangaroo	Jack Calcott	Feature film
1987	The Lighthorsemen	Tas	Feature film
1988	The Zero Option	Carne	Feature film
1989	Luigi's Ladies	Steve	Feature film
1991	Spotswood	Jerry Finn	Feature film
1993	Shotgun Wedding	Detective Frank Taylor	Feature film

=== Television ===
Year	Title	Role	Notes
1973	The Taming of the Shrew		TV play
1976–1977	The Young Doctors	Doctor Craig Rothwell	123 episodes
1978–1979	The Sullivans	Michael Watkins	74 episodes
1979	Skyways	Bryan Johnson	3 episodes
1979–1981	Cop Shop	Terry Lindford-Jones / Tom McNamara	54 episodes
1981	Bellamy	Paul Turner	1 episode
1984	Five Mile Creek	Harrison Miller	1 episode
1984	Bodyline	Bill Woodfull	Miniseries, 7 episodes
1985	Palace of Dreams	Charlie	Miniseries, 2 episodes
1985	A Thousand Skies	Sir Charles Kingsford Smith	Miniseries, 3 episodes
1985	Winners	Geoff	1 episode
1993	The Adventures of Skippy	Greg	1 episode
1993	A Country Practice	Rod Campion	2 episodes
1994	G.P.	Ted Koffel	1 episode
1995	Halifax f.p.	Kaz	Season 2, episode 2
1995	Blue Murder	Jim Loomes	Miniseries, 2 episodes
1996	McLeod's Daughters	Terry Wilcox	TV movie
1996	Twisted Tales	Arthur Pendle	1 episode
1997	Home and Away	Father Brian Little	10 episodes
1997–1999	Heartbreak High	Nat Delaine	33 episodes
1998	All Saints	Gary Mortimer	1 episode
2001	Going Home	Stunt Co-ordinator	1 episode
2003	MDA	David Lowe	1 episode
2003	Blue Heelers	Max Sandler	1 episode

== Theatre ==
Year	Title	Role	Notes	Ref.
1970	The Heiress		NIDA Theatre, Sydney	
1971	Under Milk Wood		NIDA Theatre, Sydney	
1971	The Beggar's Opera	The Player	University of NSW Old Tote Theatre, Sydney	
1971	Women Beware Women	Guardiano	University of NSW Old Tote Theatre, Sydney	
1971	Peer Gynt		University of NSW Old Tote Theatre, Sydney	
1971	The Balcony	Executioner / Mark	University of NSW Old Tote Theatre, Sydney	
1972	The Good Woman of Setzuan		University of NSW Old Tote Theatre, Sydney	
1972	Macbeth		University of NSW Old Tote Theatre, Sydney	
1973	'Tis Pity She's a Whore	Officer / Servant	University of NSW Old Tote Theatre, Sydney	
1973	Arsenic and Old Lace	Officer Brophy	University of NSW Old Tote Theatre, Sydney	
1973	Lysistrata	Spartan Ambassador	University of NSW Old Tote Theatre, Sydney	
1973–1974	What If You Died Tomorrow?	Gunter (Graeme)	Sydney Opera House, Canberra Theatre, Comedy Theatre, Melbourne	
1974	The Comedy of Errors		Arts Theatre, Adelaide with South Australian Theatre Company	
1974	She Stoops to Conquer		Playhouse, Adelaide with South Australian Theatre Company	
1975	Mariner		Jane St Theatre, Sydney with NIDA	
1975	Interplay		Jane St Theatre, Sydney with NIDA	
1975	Much Ado About Nothing		Nimrod Theatre, Sydney	
1975	Richard III	Hastings	Nimrod Theatre, Sydney	
1976	The Shoemaker's Holiday	Master Scott	Sydney Opera House with Old Tote Theatre Company	
1977	The Club	Geoff	Russell St Theatre, Melbourne with MTC	
1979–1980	Hamlet	Hamlet	Melbourne Athenaeum with MTC	
1979–1980	Rosencrantz and Guildenstern Are Dead	Hamlet	Melbourne Athenaeum with MTC	
1980	The Cherry Orchard		Playhouse, Melbourne with MTC	
1981	Protest: Audience / Private View / Protest	Vanek	Nimrod Theatre, Sydney	
1981	Cloud Nine	Harry Bagley / Gerry	Nimrod Theatre, Sydney	
1982	Camino Real	Baron de Charlus / Nursie / Lord Byron	NIDA Parade Theatre, Sydney	
1982	The Provok'd Wife	Constant	NIDA Parade Theatre, Sydney	
1982	Demolition Job		Edward St Theatre, Brisbane with QTC	
1983	As You Like It	Orlando	Nimrod Theatre, Sydney	
1984	Il Magnifico		York Theatre, Sydney	
1989	The Cherry Orchard		Playhouse, Melbourne with MTC	
1990	Siren		Wharf Theatre, Sydney with STC	
1991	Phaedra		Wharf Theatre, Sydney with STC	
1992	Antony and Cleopatra		Blackfriars Theatre, Sydney with STC	
1992	Twelfth Night		Suncorp Theatre, Brisbane	
1993	The Adman		Ensemble Theatre, Sydney	
1993–1995	South Pacific	Commander William Harbison	Australian tour & Kad Theatre, Thailand with Gordon Frost Company	
1995	Twelfth Night	Orsino	Australian tour with Bell Shakespeare	
1995	Pericles	Simonides	Australian tour with Bell Shakespeare	
1995	Blackrock	Stewart / Len / Roy	Wharf Theatre, Sydney with STC	
1996	Macbeth		Wharf Theatre, Sydney with STC	
1996	Medea		Wharf Theatre, Sydney with STC	
1998	The Piccadilly Bushman	Alec Ritchie	Merlyn Theatre, Melbourne with Playbox Theatre	

== Death ==
Walton died in 2014 at his home in Perth, following a long battle with Huntington's disease, aged 62. A memorial service was held for him at the University of NSW on Saturday 19 July, where fellow actor and friend Robert Alexander delivered a tribute.
