= James Warner (aviator) =

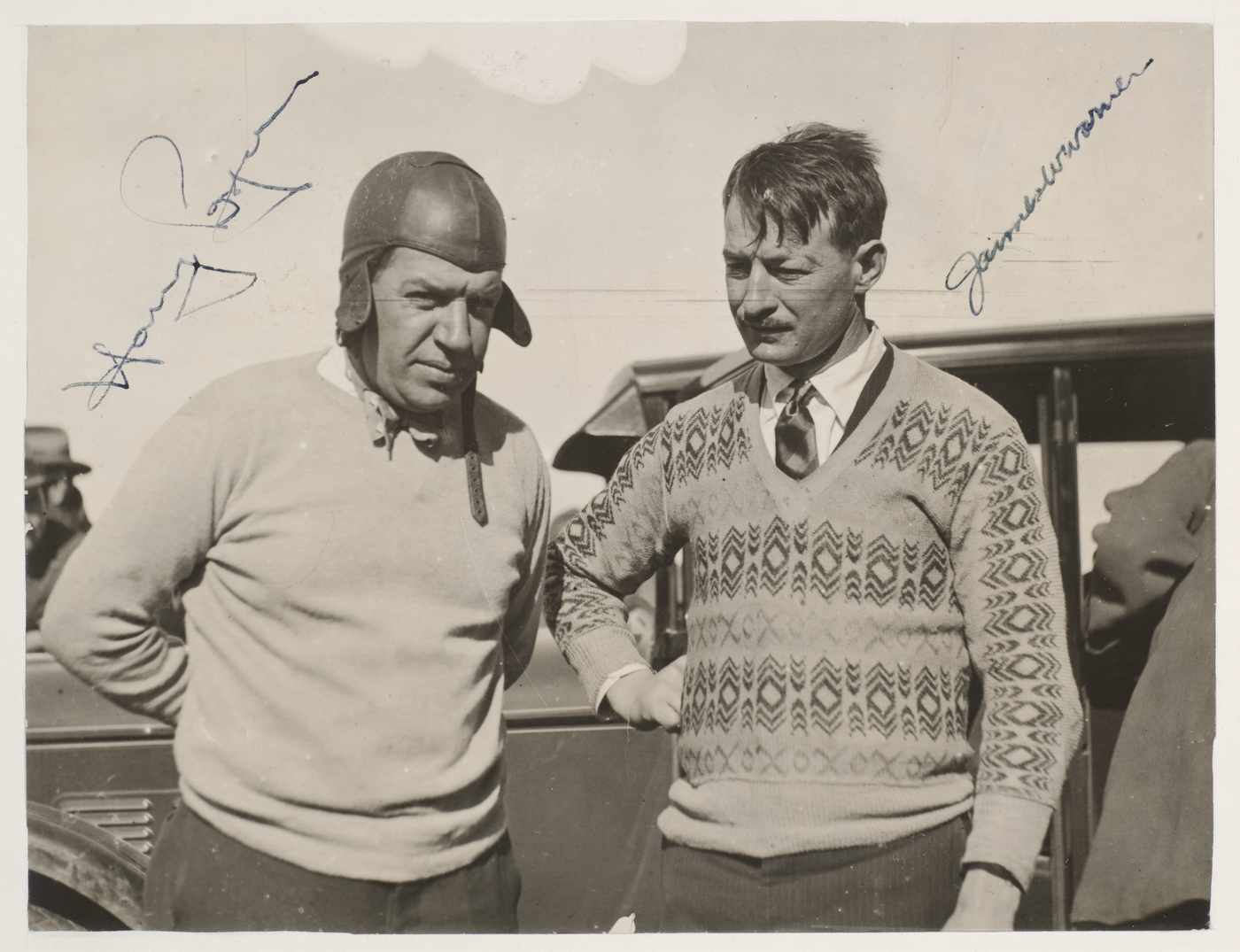
- James Warner [radio operator] right, Harry Lyon [navigator] left, ca. 1928
- Born: 1891; Lawrence, Kansas
- Died: 1970 (aged 78–79)
- Citizenship: American
- Known for: Wireless operator on the first Trans-Pacific Flight 1928
- Awards: gold commemorative medal along with $10,000 from the citizens of Oakland and William Randolph Hearst

James Warner (1891–1970) was the radio operator on the aircraft Southern Cross piloted by Charles Kingsford Smith for the first trans-Pacific flight in 1928, during which radio was first used successfully on a long distance flight.

== Early life ==
Warner was born near Lawrence, Kansas, in 1891. His parents divorced during his early childhood. His mother cared for his two sisters but their father took James and his two brothers to an orphanage in Wichita and left them there. At the age of five, he was adopted by a German family named Oswald and spent most of the rest of his childhood living and working on their farm. He also spent about a year in Germany with his adopted family. James attended both local German and English language schools in Lawrence through eighth grade and reportedly made friends easily. At age fourteen he left home and went to Wichita where he found work in a butcher shop, refusing his adopted father's pleas to return home. After learning from someone how to make harness dressing with lard and lamp black, the teenaged Warner saved enough to buy a donkey and cart, from which he sold the dressing, meanwhile making his way to Denver, where he worked in a bowling alley setting pins.

He later went to Boulder, Colorado, and worked driving a team of horses with a road-grader. At about the age of eighteen, he got a job on a dairy farm where he reportedly milked 50 cows twice a day and developed the large forearms he kept for the rest of his life. He bought a dairy route from the farmer, making daily deliveries. However, this ended when he and the dairy farmer had a dispute and Warner lost his substantial investment. Following this he may have spent time as a hobo during his late teens, which was fairly common in early 20th-century North America, riding the rails and living in hobo encampments.

== Naval service ==
In 1911 at about age twenty Warner went to Denver and enlisted in the US Navy. He spent boot camp at Goat Island (later called Yerba Buena Island) in San Francisco Bay. Warner was then sent to the western Pacific and on to China where he served on gunboats patrolling the Yangtze River. He advanced to Quartermaster first class and in 1916 trained in the then-new rating of Electricians Mate, Radio. By 1919 he was one of the first chief radiomen in the US Navy. During World War I Warner served on the USS Parker, which patrolled the coasts of Ireland. He was then assigned to the USS St. Louis. Warner may have also sometimes served as a German–English interpreter for naval officers after the war. He was later assigned as a radio instructor in San Diego and commanded the compass station at Point Reyes in Northern California. On 30 March 1928 Warner left the navy in San Francisco.

== Southern Cross ==
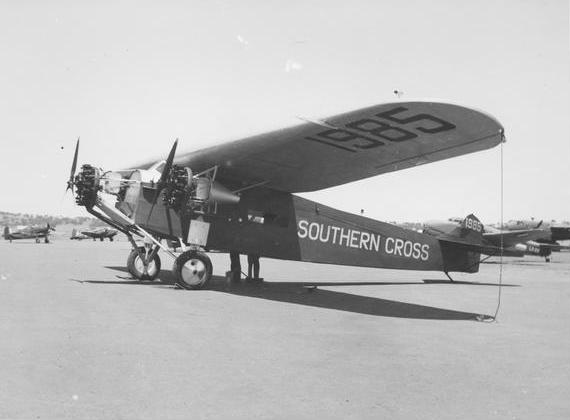
The Southern Cross at a RAAF base near Canberra in 1943, 15 years after its historic flight across the Pacific. By this time Warner was serving as a naval radio instructor at Texas A&M University.

Through friends he learned Harry Lyon was thinking of going with Charles Kingsford Smith on a planned long-distance flight from California, across the Pacific Ocean. He tried to talk his friend Lyon out of the flight, but wound up on the crew. On 31 May 1928, the four-person crew took off from Oakland, California, in the Southern Cross. After a stop for rest and refueling in Hawaii, they flew to Fiji, enduring over 34 hours of flight across open sea before touching down at Albert Park in Suva, where a large and enthusiastic crowd greeted the first aircraft ever to land in Fiji. The Southern Cross landed at Eagle Farm Airport in Brisbane, Australia, on 9 June before a crowd of 25,000 people. They flew to Sydney the following day.

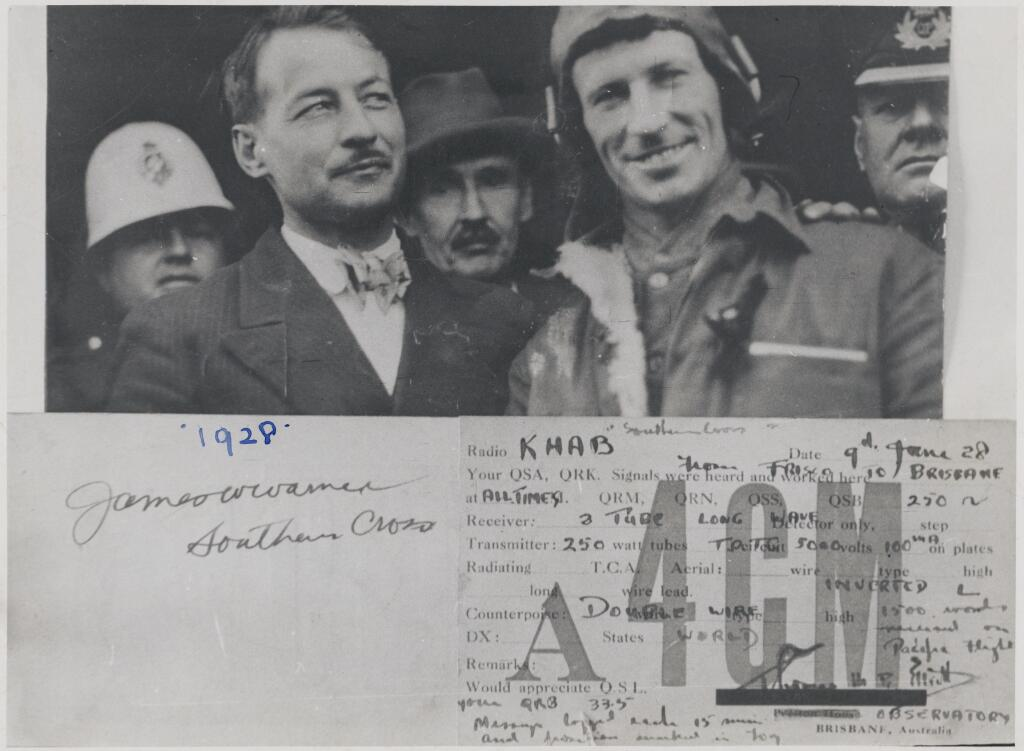
James W. Warner and Charles Kingsford Smith on arrival, Brisbane, 9 June 1928

The flight of the Southern Cross marked the first successful use of radio on a long distance flight. Returning to California, Warner and Lyon each were given a 4 oz gold commemorative medal along with $10,000 from the citizens of Oakland and William Randolph Hearst. Warner then bought two aeroplanes and started training for a flight to Japan. However, during a crude in-air refuelling whilst trying to set an endurance record, the pilot of the single-engine craft fell asleep and landed upside-down in the mud flats near San Mateo and San Francisco Bay. Warner's flight to Japan never got beyond planning.

== Later career ==
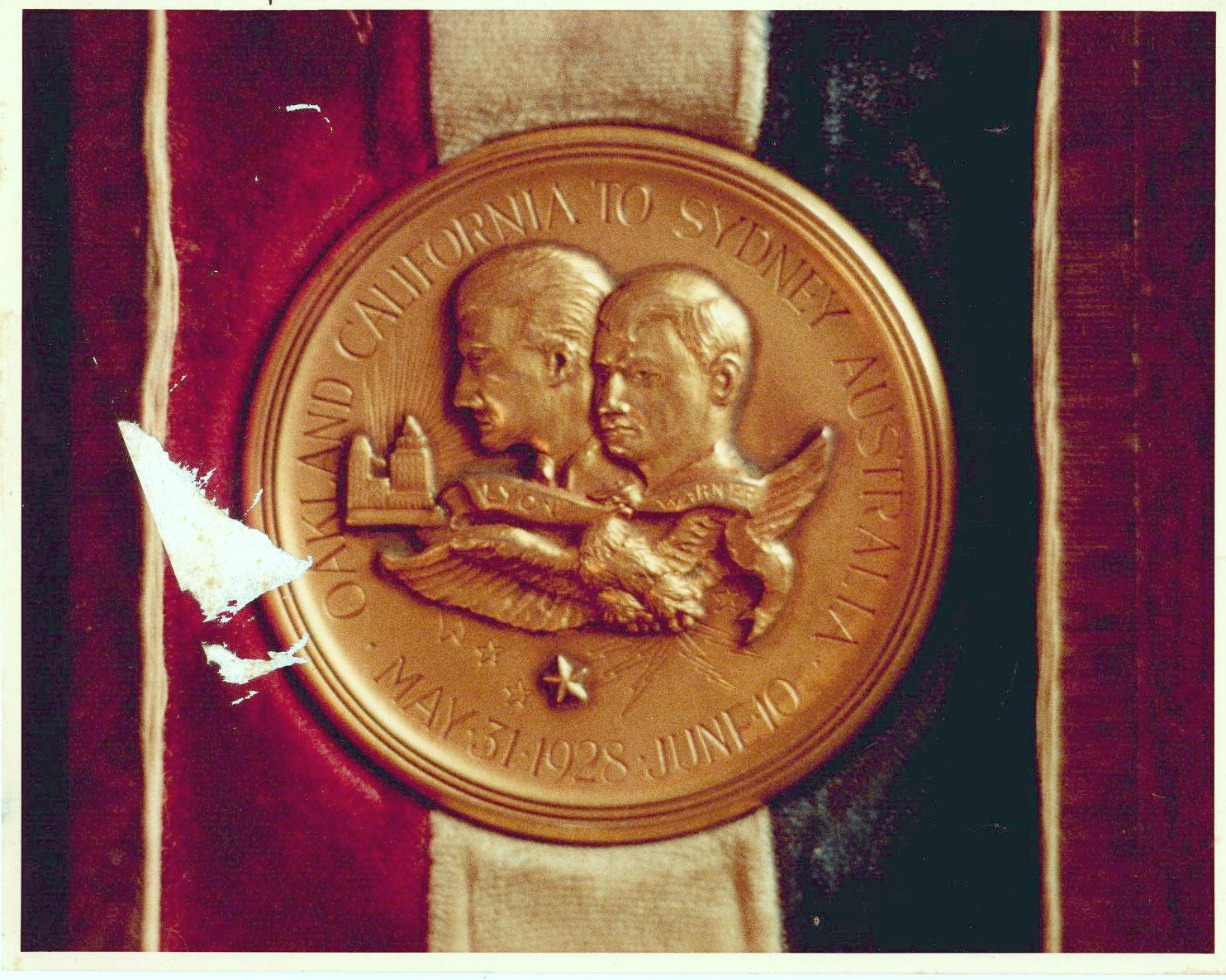
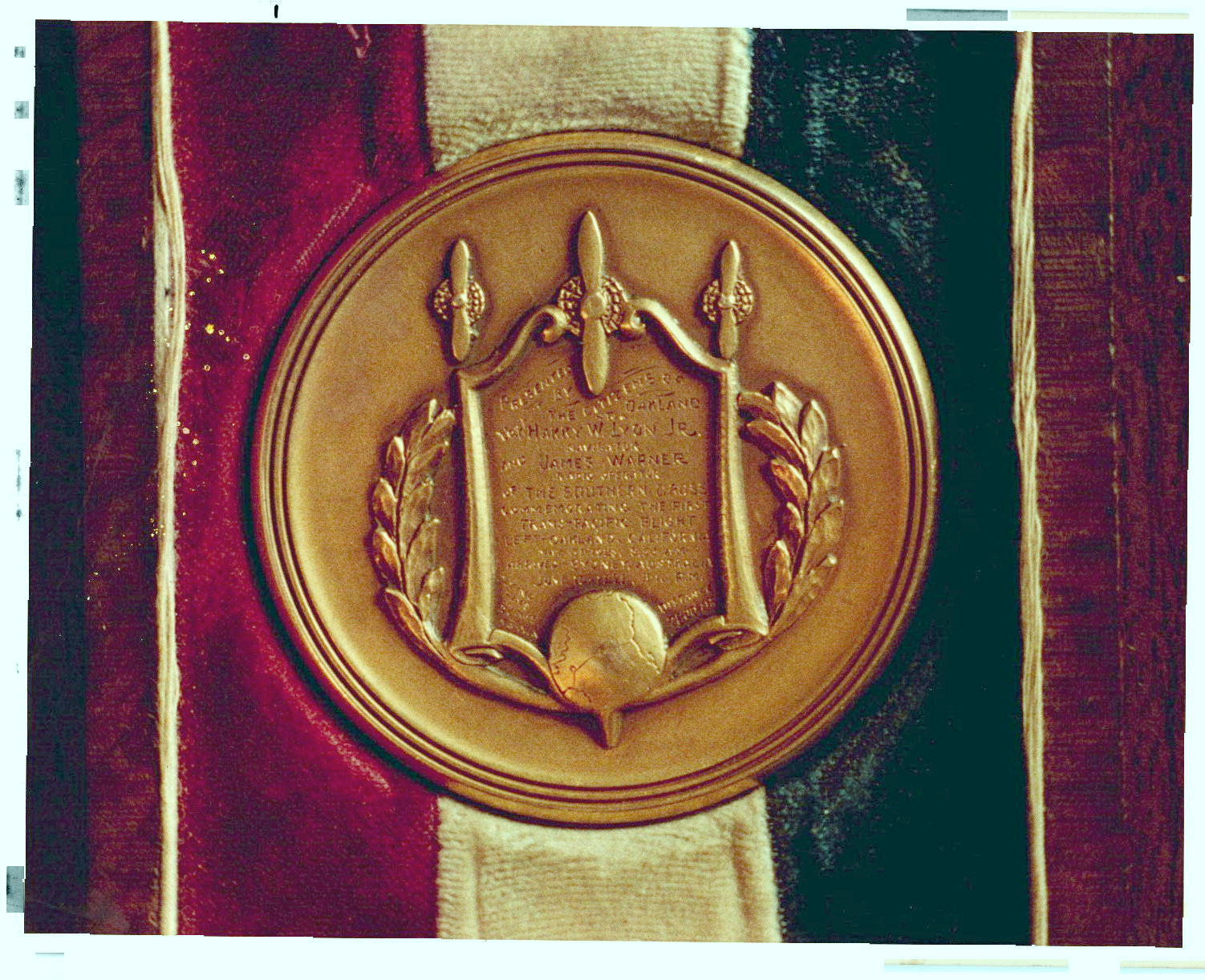
Medal presented to Warner by the city of Oakland

In about 1930 Warner went to Los Angeles where he opened a radio shop. He hired an engineer and the two designed and manufactured a superheterodyne kit which could be installed in the era's heterodyne radio receivers. He also experimented with building an electronic organ and was hired by Hearst to install a sound system at San Simeon in Northern California. Later during the Great Depression of the 1930s Warner moved to Fresno and worked for a water softener business, traveling in California’s Central Valley. He met his future wife in Highway City north of Fresno, where she owned a roadside diner.

In August 1940 Warner was recalled into the navy and sent to Hawaii. In 1941 he was transferred to the Navy’s central receiving station in Washington DC. Warner was then assigned to College Station, Texas, in March 1943, where he taught radio at Texas A&M University until the end of World War II.

== Bibliography ==
- American Aviation Historical Society Journal, Volume 28, #2 Summer 1983 p. 140
- American Aviation Historical Society Journal, Volume 24, #4 Winter 1979 p. 279, "Harry Lyon and The Southern Cross", Lloyd S. Gates
- Great Aircraft and Their Pilots, New York Graphic Society, Roy Cross, 1971 p. 70
- Famous First Flights That Changed History, Doubleday 1968, Lowell Thomas & Lowell Thomas Jr. p. 184
- Hidden Heroes, Wilmer Bros Limited, 1971 Trevor J. Constable, chapter 10
- "Jim Warner – Radioman", American Aviation Historical Society Journal, Tom Warner
- Milestones of Aviation, The Smithsonian Institution National Air and Space Museum, Crescent Books 1991, pp. 59–61
- Our Conquest of the Pacific Kingsford-Smith & Ulm, The National Geographic Magazine, October 1928
- Smithy, A.S. Barnes & Co. 1971, Ward McNally
- Smithy, Little Brown & Co. 1998, Ian Mackersey
- Smithy, The World’s Greatest Aviator, Summit Books. 1977 Pedr Davis, pp. 45–65
- The Trans Pacific Flight, Liberty Magazine, April 19, 1930, p. 17 James W Warner
- The Flight of The Southern Cross, The National Travel Club 1929, C. E. Kingsford–Smith & C. T. P. Ulm, chapter XXI
