= Harry Lyon (aviator) =

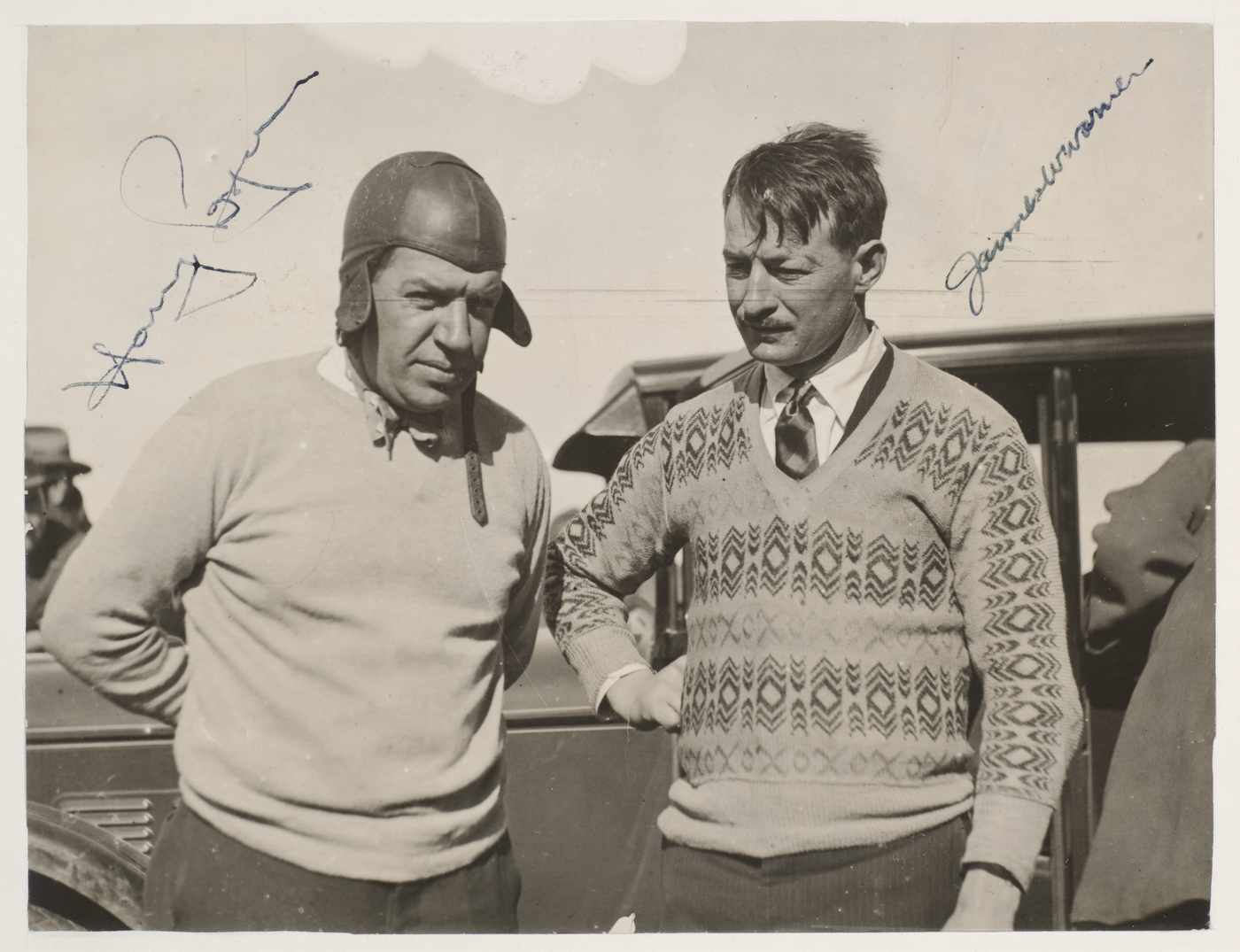
Harry Lyon [navigator] left, James Warner [right] ca. 1928

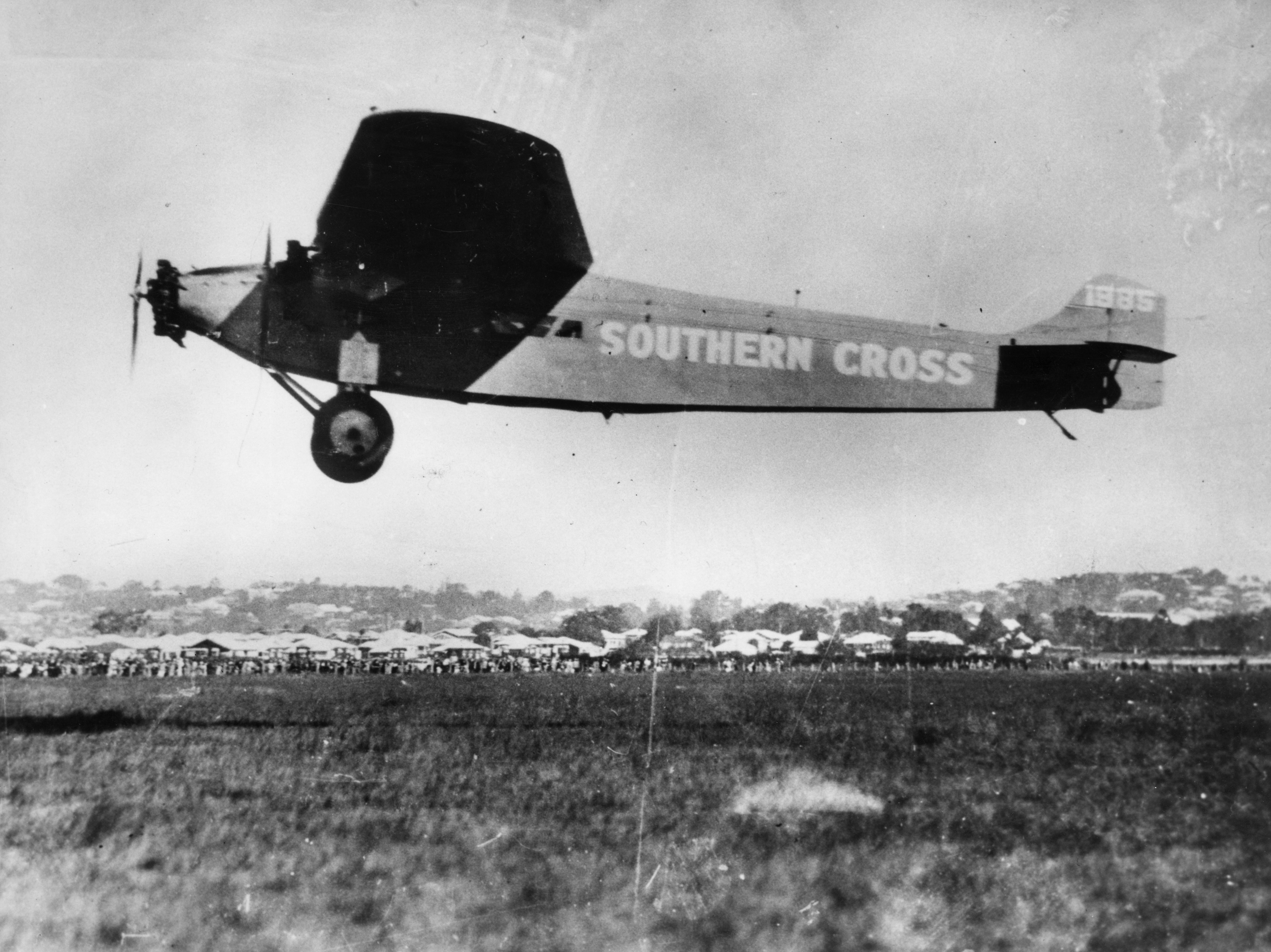
The Southern Cross landing in Brisbane in 1928.

American Harry Lyon (1885?–1963?), was the navigator for the first flight across the Pacific in 1928 with Charles Kingsford Smith (as pilot), Charles Ulm (as co-pilot) and fellow-American James Warner as the (radio operator) in the Southern Cross.

According to the Spokane Daily Chronicle, he was a son of US Navy Rear Admiral Henry W. Lyon and served as a lieutenant commander on the transport USS Westerner and as first lieutenant aboard the cruiser USS St. Louis during World War I. However, an article of uncertain reliability but much greater detail states that though he was accepted into the United States Naval Academy in 1905, he flunked out and worked in the Merchant Marine, eventually rising to captain of the S.S. Likliki.

After the pioneering flight, he took up rum running in San Francisco, California.
