= Southern Cross (aircraft) =

Historically significant small fixed-wing aircraft

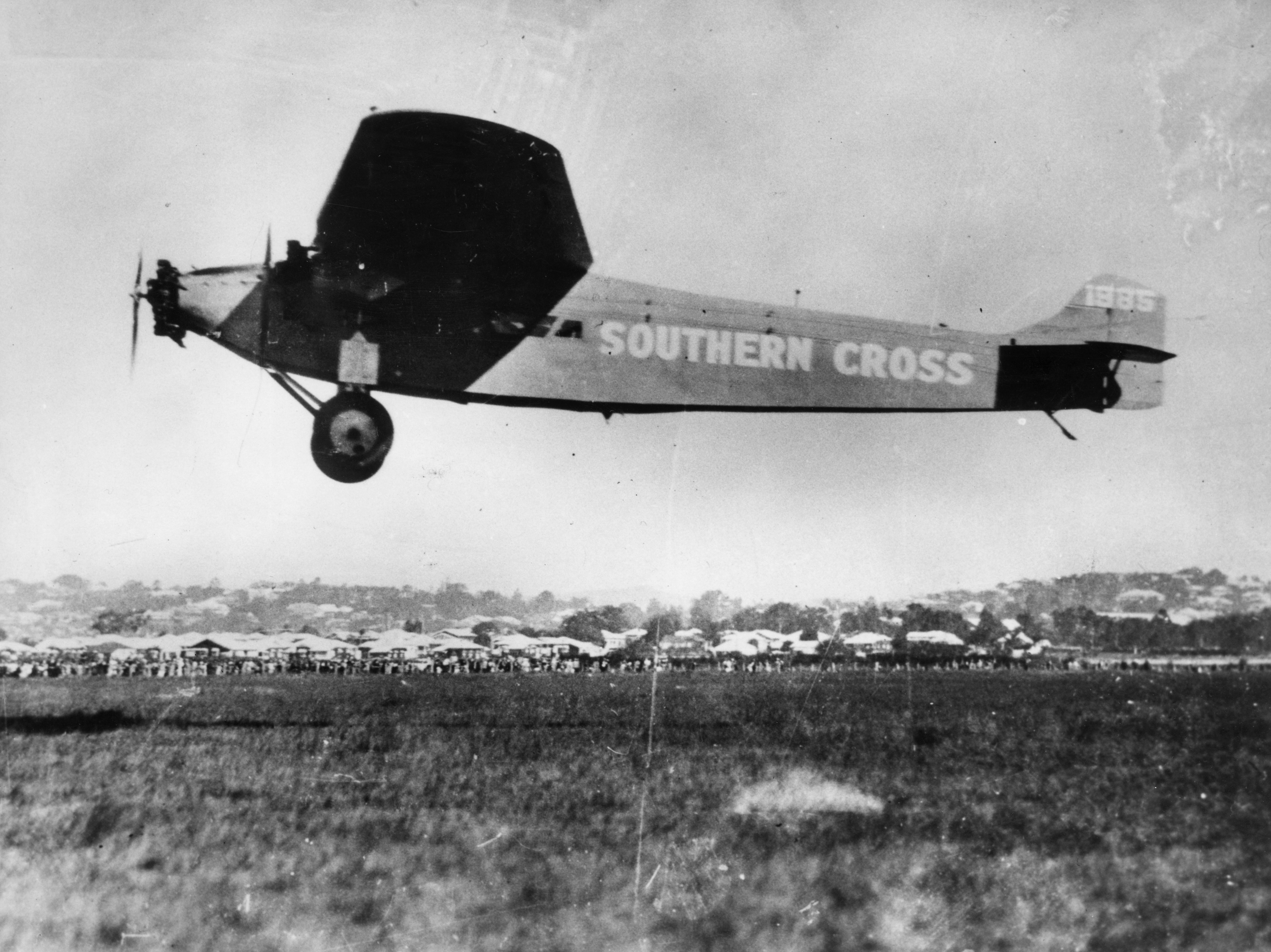
- Southern Cross landing in Brisbane, 1928

General information
- Type: F.VIIb/3m
- Manufacturer: Fokker
- Owners: The Detroit News; Charles Kingsford Smith, Charles Ulm; Commonwealth of Australia (1935–)
- Registration: 1985; G-AUSU (1928–1929); VH-USU (1931–)

History
- Preserved at: The Kingsford Smith Memorial near Brisbane Airport

The Southern Cross is a Fokker F.VIIb/3m trimotor monoplane that was flown by Australian aviators Charles Kingsford Smith, Charles Ulm, Harry Lyon and James Warner in the first-ever trans-Pacific flight to Australia from the mainland United States, a distance of about 11,670 kilometres (7,250 mi), in 1928.

== History ==
The Southern Cross began life as the Detroiter, a polar exploration aircraft of the Detroit News-Wilkins Arctic expedition. The aircraft had crashed in Alaska in 1926, and was recovered and repaired by the Australian expedition leader, Hubert Wilkins. Wilkins, who had decided the Fokker was too large for his Arctic explorations, met with Kingsford Smith and Charles Ulm in San Francisco and arranged to sell them the aircraft, without engines or instruments.

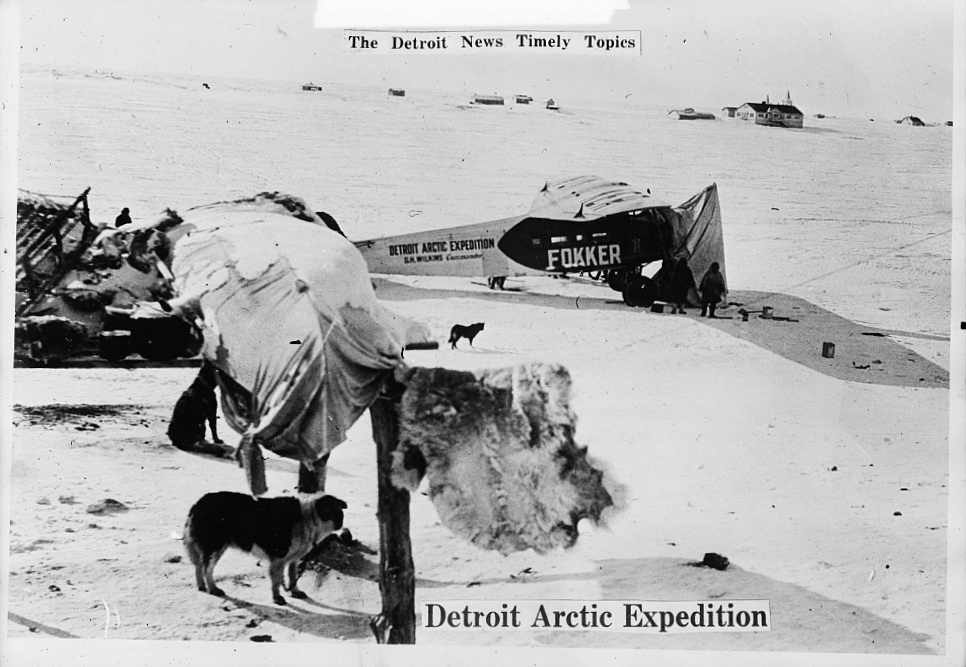
Southern Cross when it was called Detroiter and still owned by Hubert Wilkins.

Having fitted the aircraft with engines and other required parts, Kingsford Smith made two attempts at the world endurance record in an attempt to raise funds and interest for his trans-Pacific flight. However, after the New South Wales government withdrew its sponsorship of the flight, it looked as if the money would run out and Kingsford Smith would have to sell the Southern Cross. The aircraft was bought by American aviator and philanthropist Allan Hancock, who then loaned it back to Kingsford Smith and Ulm. The three Wright Whirlwind engines were funded by Melbourne businessman Sidney Myer.

== Trans-Pacific flight ==
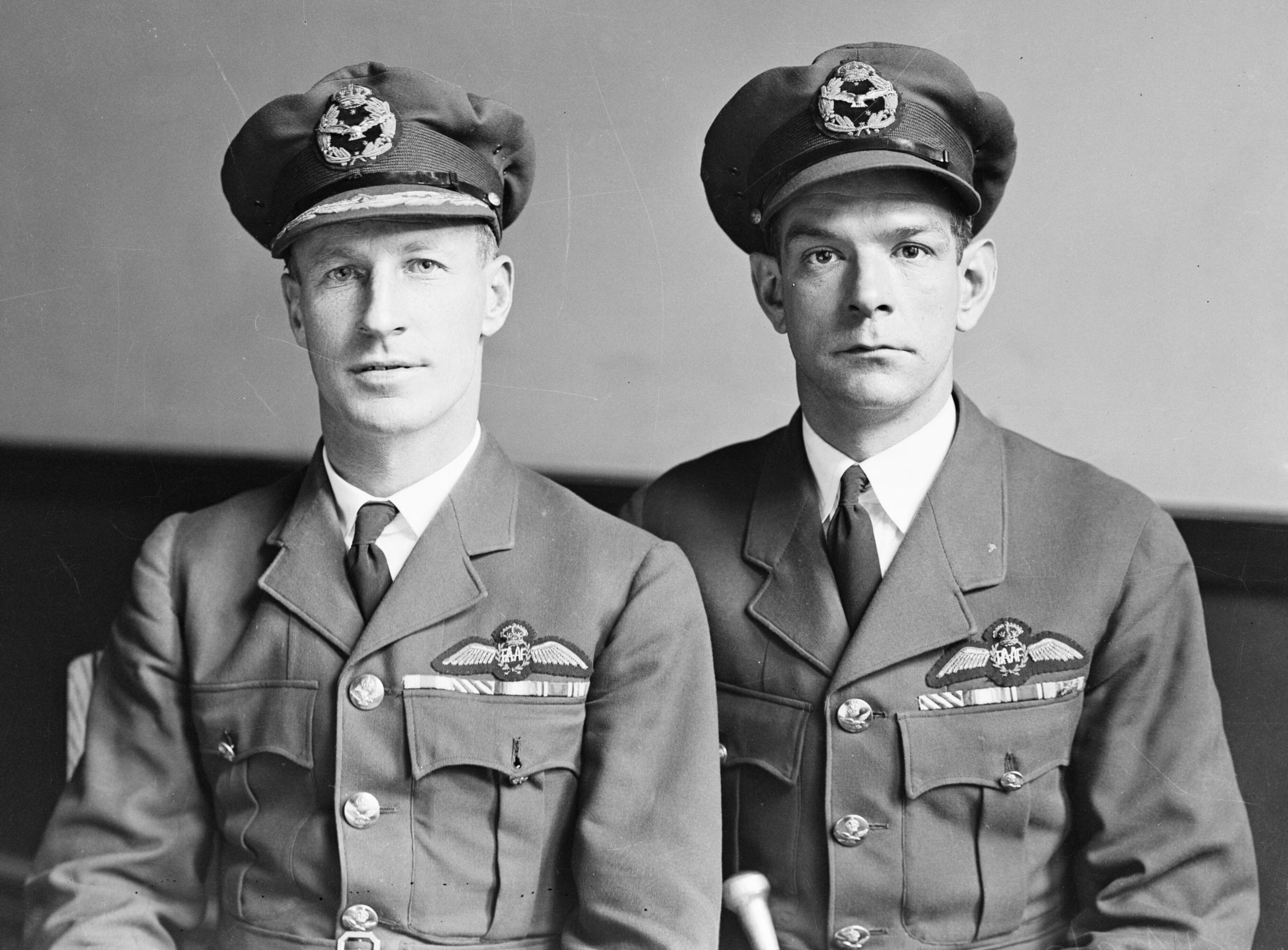
Charles Kingsford Smith and Charles Ulm in RAAF uniform

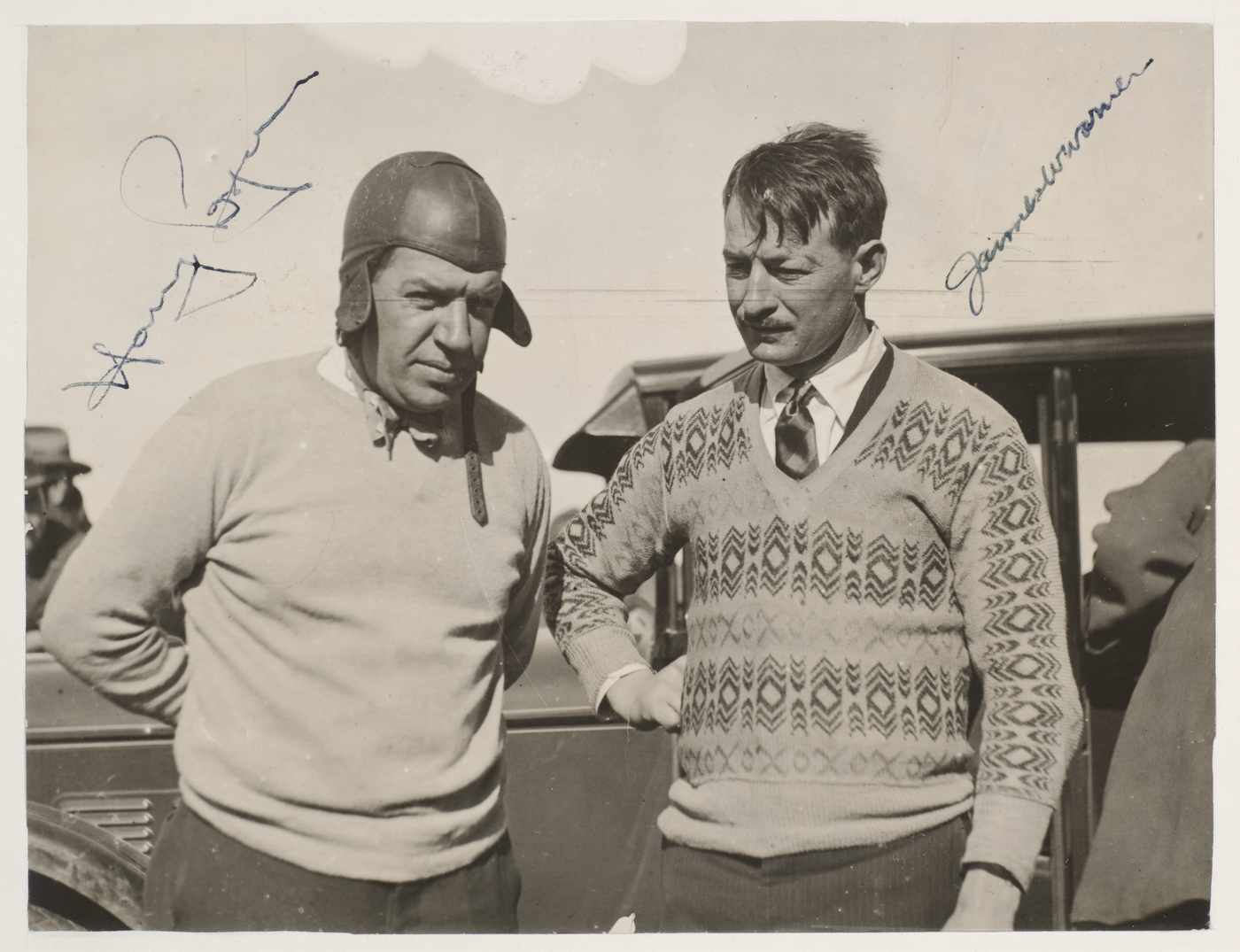
Harry Lyon [navigator] left, James Warner [right] ca. 1928

On 31 May 1928, the crew — Charles Kingsford Smith, Charles Ulm, and Americans Harry Lyon (navigator) and James Warner (radio operator) — took off from Oakland, California, United States. The Southern Cross stopped for rest and refuelling in Hawaii before setting off for Fiji. This leg of the journey took 34 1/2 hours of flight across open seas before gliding past the Grand Pacific Hotel in Suva, where a large and enthusiastic crowd saw the first aircraft to land in Fiji touch down at Albert Park. The Southern Cross landed at Eagle Farm Airport in Brisbane, Queensland, Australia, on 9 June, where a crowd of 25,000 people were waiting to greet the Southern Cross on its arrival at the airport. The Southern Cross flew on to Sydney the following day (10 June).

The aircraft was in constant radio communication with ships and shore during the flight using four transmitters and three receivers powered by a ram air turbine attached to the fuselage below the cockpit. Transmitters included one 50-watt short-wave set operating at a 33.5-metre wavelength and two 60-watt sets operating at a 600-metre wavelength, with one 600-metre emergency waterproof set capable of operating eight hours submerged. Receivers, sharing a common audio amplifier, included a short-wave, long-wave and beacon. The first paid commercial messages were sent and received during the flight and a new world record distance for radio was set with a short-wave reception at Bloemfontein, South Africa, the long way around the world at 20,600 kilometres (12,800 mi). Direct short-wave aircraft-to-shore communications were maintained with the Pacific Coast until the flight was four hours out of Honolulu which had been monitoring the flight from two hours after departure with a similar reception overlap on the Honolulu to Suva leg. Success on this flight influenced Admiral Byrd to equip his three Antarctic Expedition aircraft with similar equipment.

== Trans-Tasman flights ==
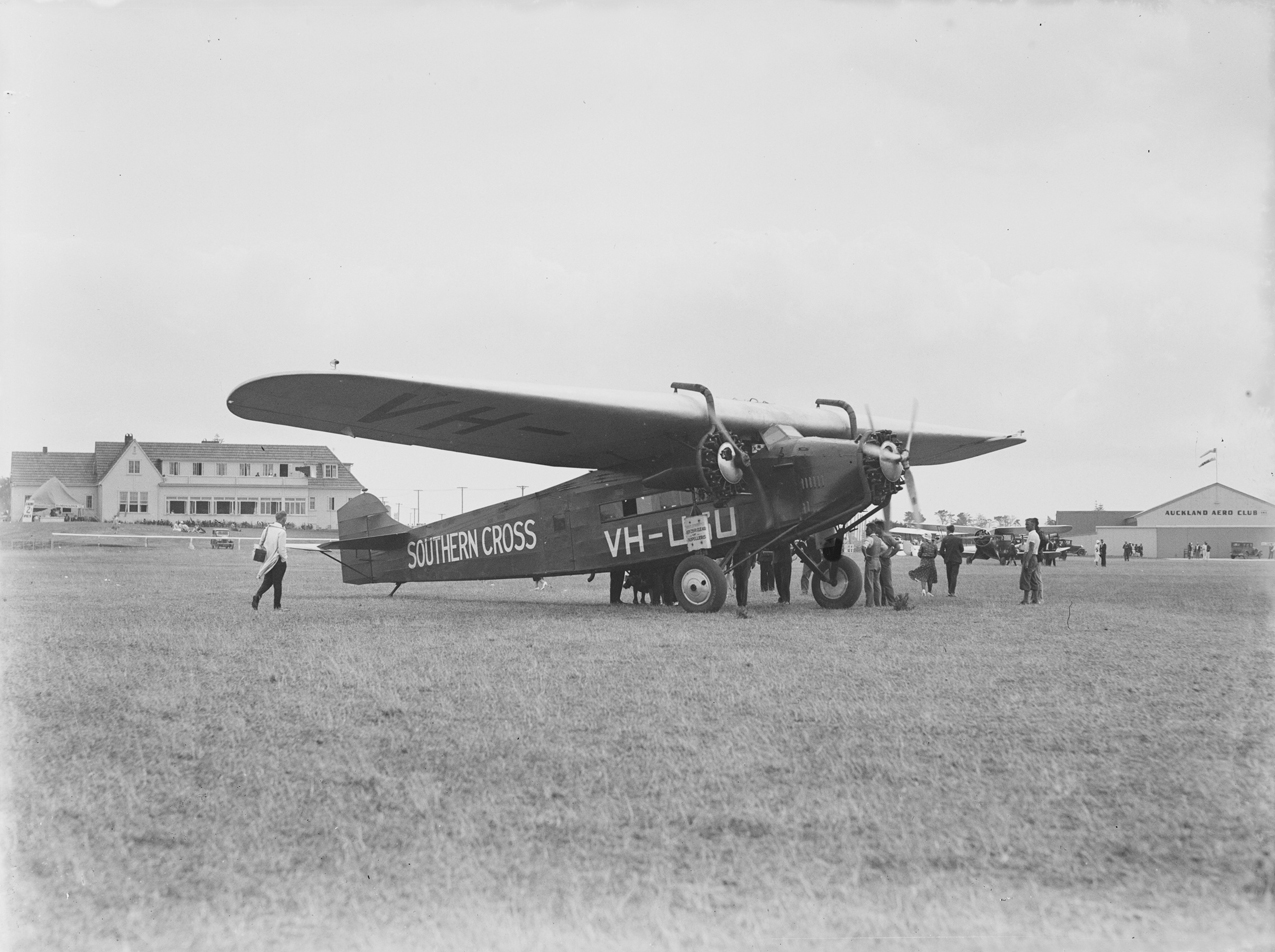
A crowd gathered around the Southern Cross (VH-USU), c. 1931–35

Kingsford Smith, Ulm, Litchfield and McWilliams also made the first nonstop Trans-Tasman flight in the Southern Cross — over the Tasman Sea from Australia to New Zealand — beginning with the first crossing on 10–11 September 1928, a distance of 2,670 kilometres (1,660 mi). They then flew back to Australia.

Guy Menzies completed the first solo trans-Tasman flight in the Southern Cross Junior in 1931.

== 1929 crash ==
In 1929, Kingsford Smith and Ulm set out on the Southern Cross from Sydney for England. When radio contact was lost, a search was organised. In April 1929, Australian National Airways or the Sydney Citizens' Relief Committee engaged Les Holden to join the search. According to one newspaper article, Holden flew a total of 14,000 kilometres (9,000 mi) and was in the air for 100 hours, before spotting the missing aircraft on a mud flat near the Glenelg River in Western Australia. The crew of Southern Cross were rescued, though two other searchers, Keith Vincent Anderson and Henry Smith "Bobby" Hitchcock, lost their lives due to dehydration, when they were forced to land their Westland Widgeon aircraft known as the Kookaburra in the Tanami Desert, due to an engine problem with the aircraft and a faulty compass.

== Preservation ==
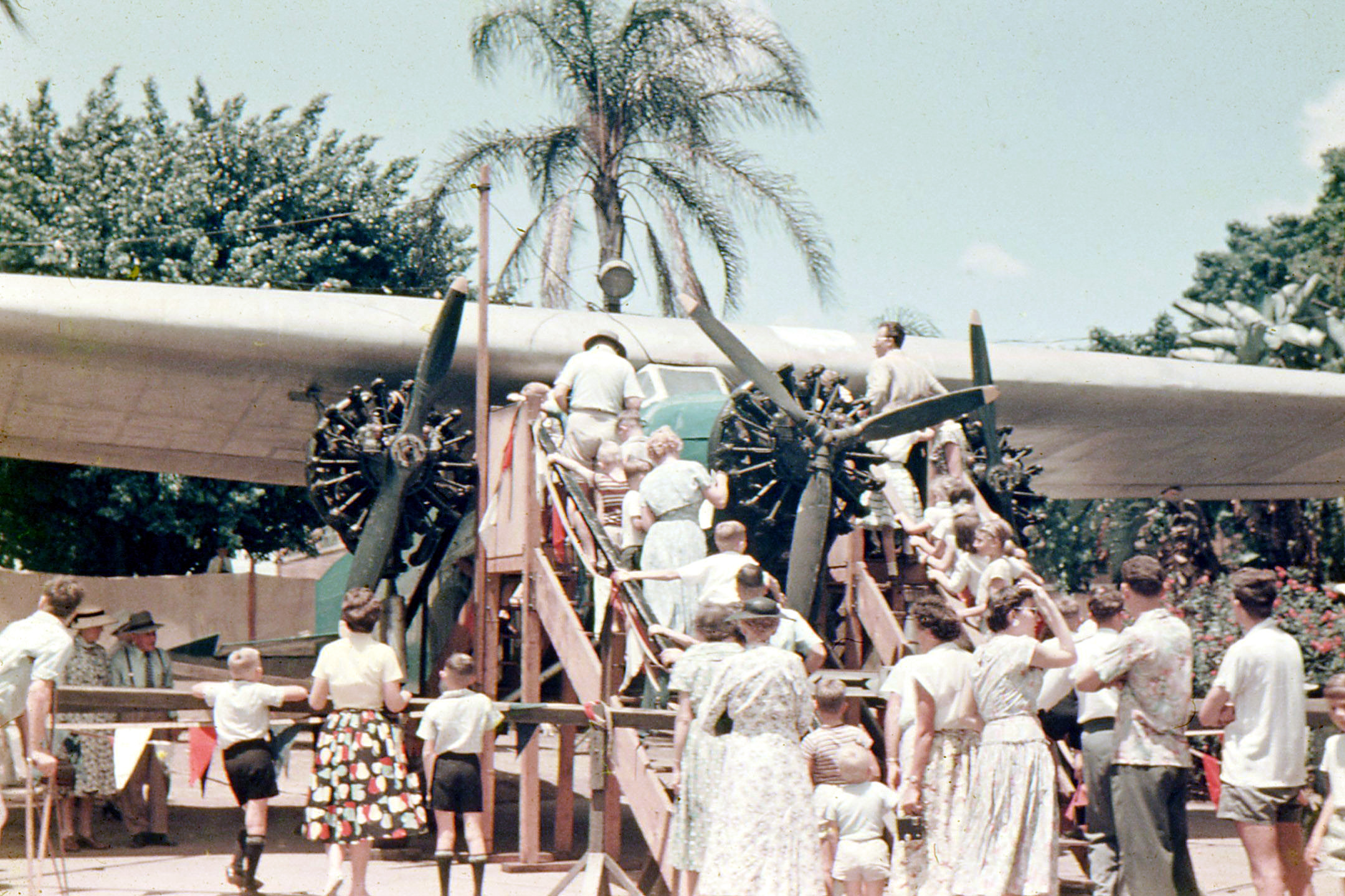
The Southern Cross in Brisbane c.1957 prior to moving to its permanent shelter.

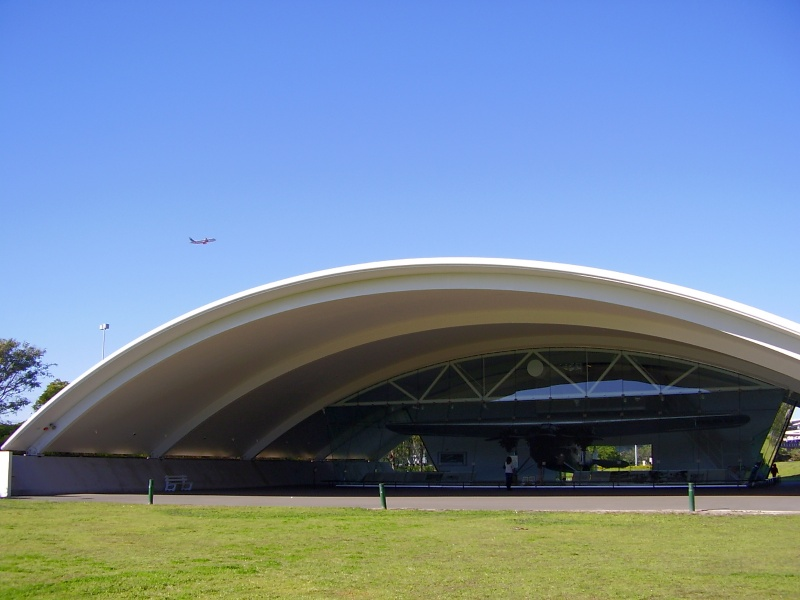
The Kingsford Smith Memorial near Brisbane Airport, housing the Southern Cross

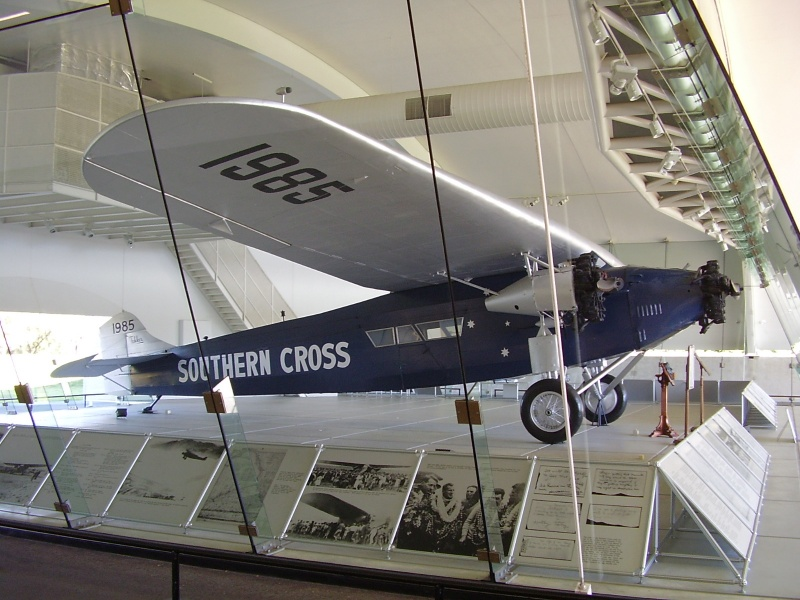
The Southern Cross inside the Kingsford Smith Memorial

Shortly before Kingsford Smith's death in 1935, he sold the Southern Cross to the Government of Australia, for display in a museum. The aircraft was brought out of retirement briefly in 1945 for the filming of the movie Smithy. It was refurbished in 1985 under the supervision of Jim Schofield, a senior aviation civil servant and air crash investigator. The Southern Cross is now preserved in a special glass hangar memorial on Airport Drive, near the international terminal at Brisbane Airport.

Australian aviation enthusiast Austin Byrne was part of the large crowd at Sydney's Mascot Aerodrome in June 1928 to welcome the Southern Cross and its crew following their successful trans-Pacific flight. Witnessing this event inspired Byrne to make a 1:24 scale model of the Southern Cross, made mostly from brass finished in gold and silver plating. Kingsford Smith disappeared before Byrne had completed the model. After Kingsford Smith's disappearance, Byrne continued to expand and enhance his tribute with paintings, photographs, documents, and art works he created, designed or commissioned. Between 1930 and his death in 1993, Byrne devoted his life to creating and touring his Southern Cross Memorial.

A full-sized flying reproduction of the Southern Cross was built in South Australia between 1980 and 1987, and is the largest known reproduction aircraft in the world. Sergeant Anthony Lohrey of the Royal Australian Air Force, Aircraft Research and Development Unit (ARDU) oversaw its construction, and it was piloted by Colin Watt and Peter Gardiner.

On 25 May 2002 at Parafield Airport the aircraft lost a main wheel on takeoff. The replica was landed on the one good wheel and the tail-skid with the pilot keeping the damaged undercarriage off the ground by keeping the wing high in the air. As the aircraft slowed, the wing came down and snapped off approximately 3 metres (10 ft) of the wing tip. After considerable negotiation the Historical Aircraft Restoration Society (HARS) acquired the aircraft from the Government of South Australia in 2010, and the aircraft was transported to HARS facility at Shellharbour Airport, Albion Park. The replica aircraft has been restored to full airworthy status by HARS volunteers. This included restoration of the handcrafted all-wooden spruce and plywood wing. The aircraft carries the original registration of VH-USU.

On 8 December 2023 at Shellharbour Airport "Southern Cross" flew again after the completion of restoration work and testing at HARS. Captain Bruce Simpson and Captain Mark Thurstan were in control of this historical flight which lasted approx 35min over the airport and was reported by local and national media channels.

== Notes ==
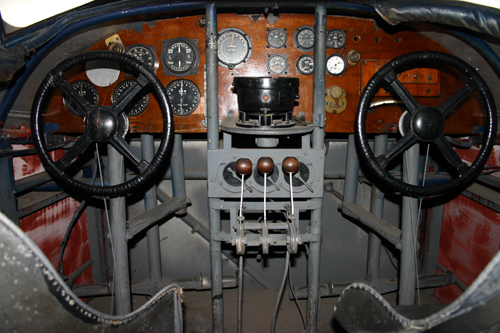
Southern Cross cockpit photographed in 2009

The Southern Cross's original registration was "1985" – this number can be seen on the wings and tail of the aircraft in photos taken at the time of its first record-breaking flight. Kingsford Smith re-registered it in Australia as "G-AUSU" (4 July 1928 to 3 July 1929), and then "VH-USU" (5 April 1931 – ). The "1985" marks and original colour scheme were restored when the plane went on public display.

The Southern Cross was named after the Southern Cross constellation, a popular symbol of the Southern Hemisphere in general and Australia in particular. Kingsford Smith continued the theme with his later aircraft Southern Cross Minor and Southern Cross Junior (both Avro Avians), Miss Southern Cross (Percival Gull), and Lady Southern Cross (Lockheed Altair). He also produced a car with the name, and gave the aircraft operated by his airline, Australian National Airways, similar names beginning with Southern.

In September 2010, the old Gateway Motorway, which runs past the site of the original Eagle Farm Airport, was renamed Southern Cross Way.

== Bibliography ==
- Prins, François (Winter 1993). "Brisbane's Heritage". Air Enthusiast. No. 52. pp. 26–27. ISSN 0143-5450.
