= Charles Ulm =

Australian aviator

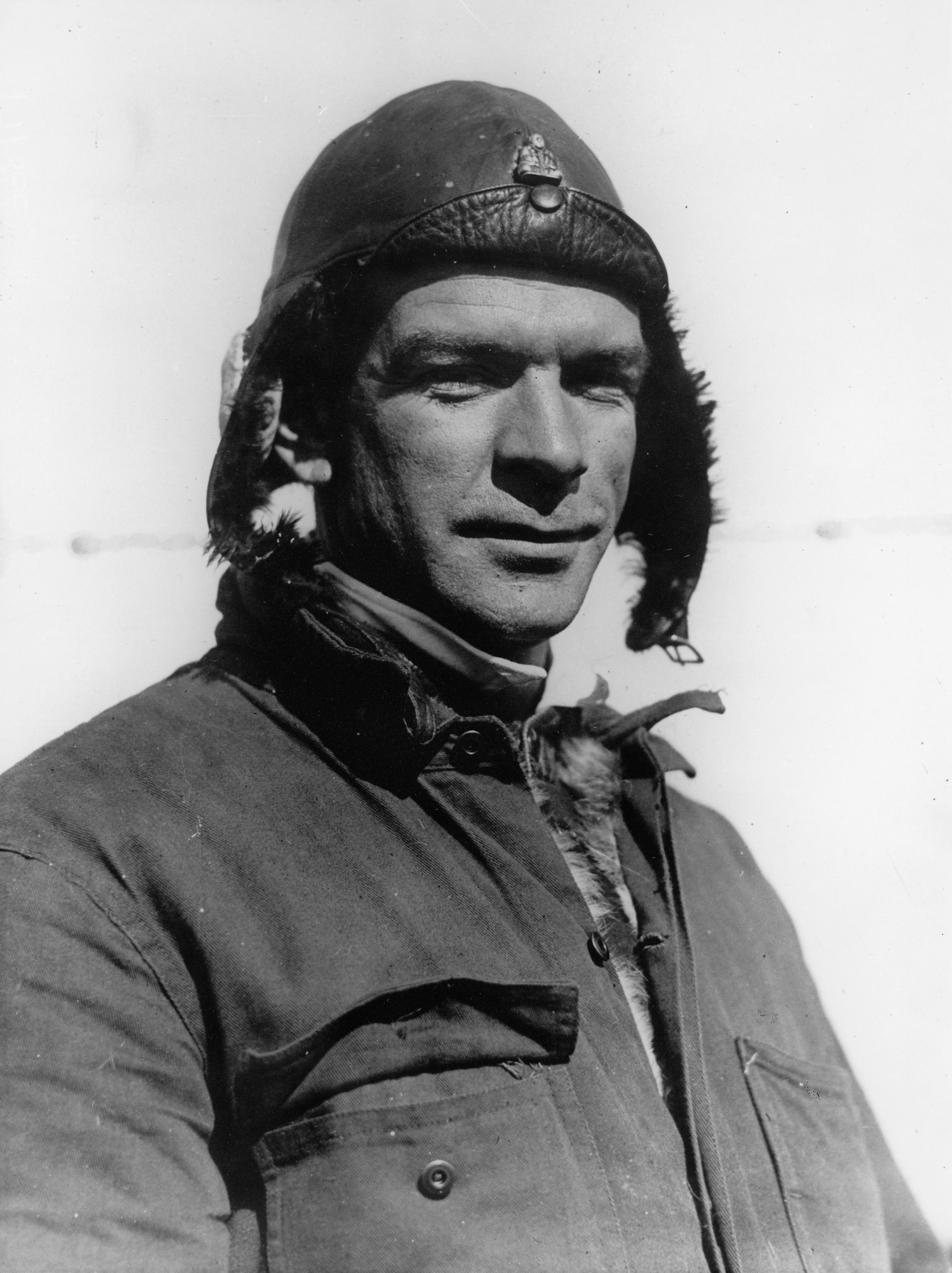
- Ulm in 1928
- Born: Charles Thomas Philippe Ulm; 18 October 1898; Melbourne, Australia
- Died: 3 December 1934 (aged 36)
- Known for: Trans-Pacific flight; England - Australia flight record: 6 days, 17 hours and 56 minutes; Disappearance during flight
- Awards: Air Force Cross

Charles Thomas Philippe Ulm AFC (18 October 1898 – 3 December 1934) was a pioneer Australian aviator. He partnered with Charles Kingsford Smith in achieving a number of aviation firsts, serving as Kingsford Smith's co-pilot on the first transpacific flight and the first flight between Australia and New Zealand. He and two others disappeared near Hawaii in 1934 while undertaking a test flight for an air service between Australia and the United States.

Ulm was a member of the proto-fascist New Guard.

== Early life ==
Ulm was born on 18 October 1898 in Middle Park, Victoria. He was the third son of Ada Emma (née Greenland) and Emile Gustave Ulm. His father was a French-born artist and his mother was an Australian. Ulm spent his early years in Melbourne, moving to Sydney as a child where his family settled in Mosman. He was educated at state schools.

== World War I ==
Ulm joined the Australian Imperial Force (AIF) in September 1914, enlisting under the name "Charles Jackson" and lying about his age. He fought and was wounded at Gallipoli in 1915, and on the Western Front in 1918.

Ulm was married twice. In 1919 he married Isabel Amy Winter. After divorcing his first wife, in 1927 he married Mary Josephine Callaghan.

== Partnership with Charles Kingsford Smith ==
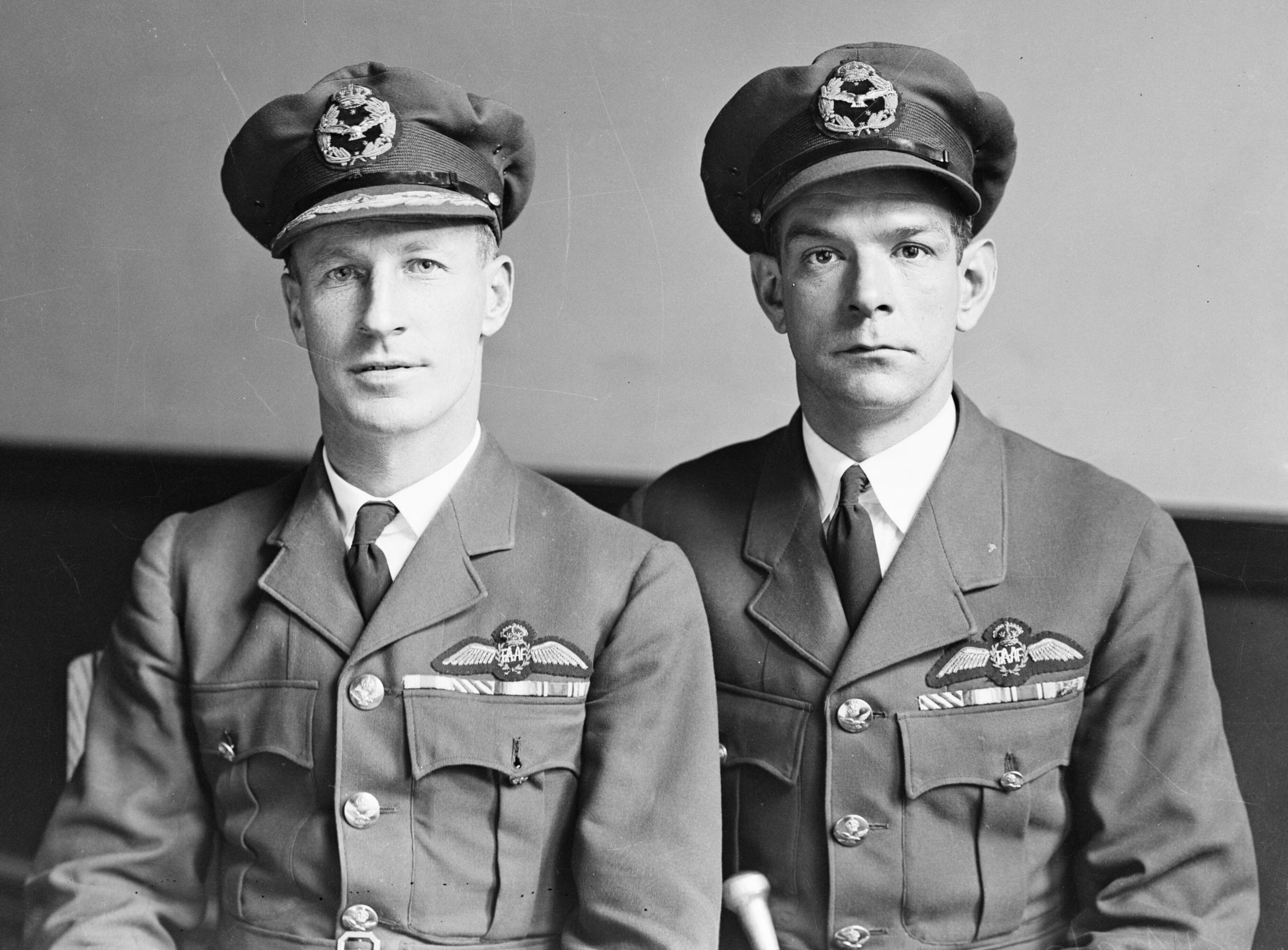
Charles Kingsford Smith and Ulm in RAAF uniform

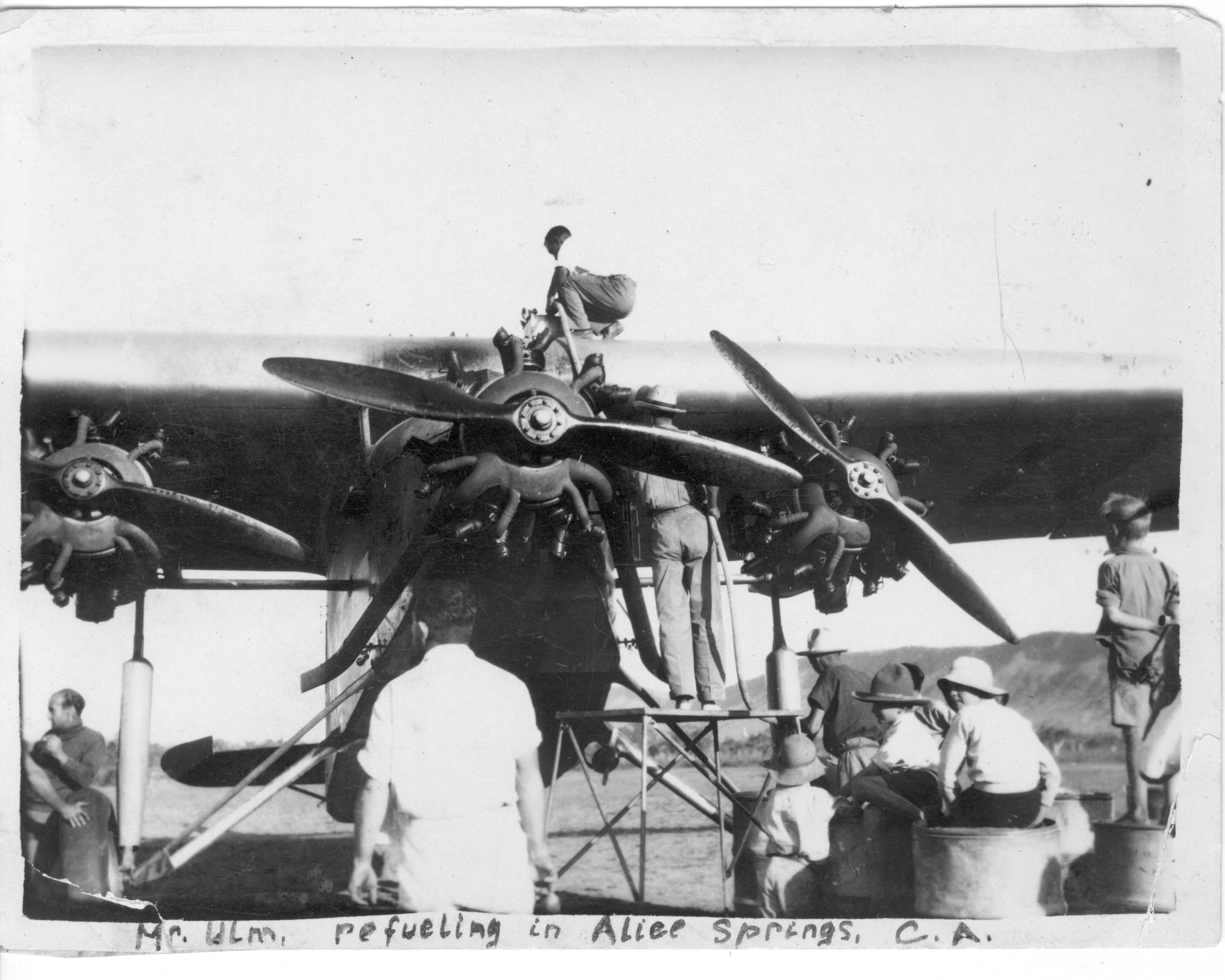
Ulm refueling the Faith in Australia in Alice Springs in 1933

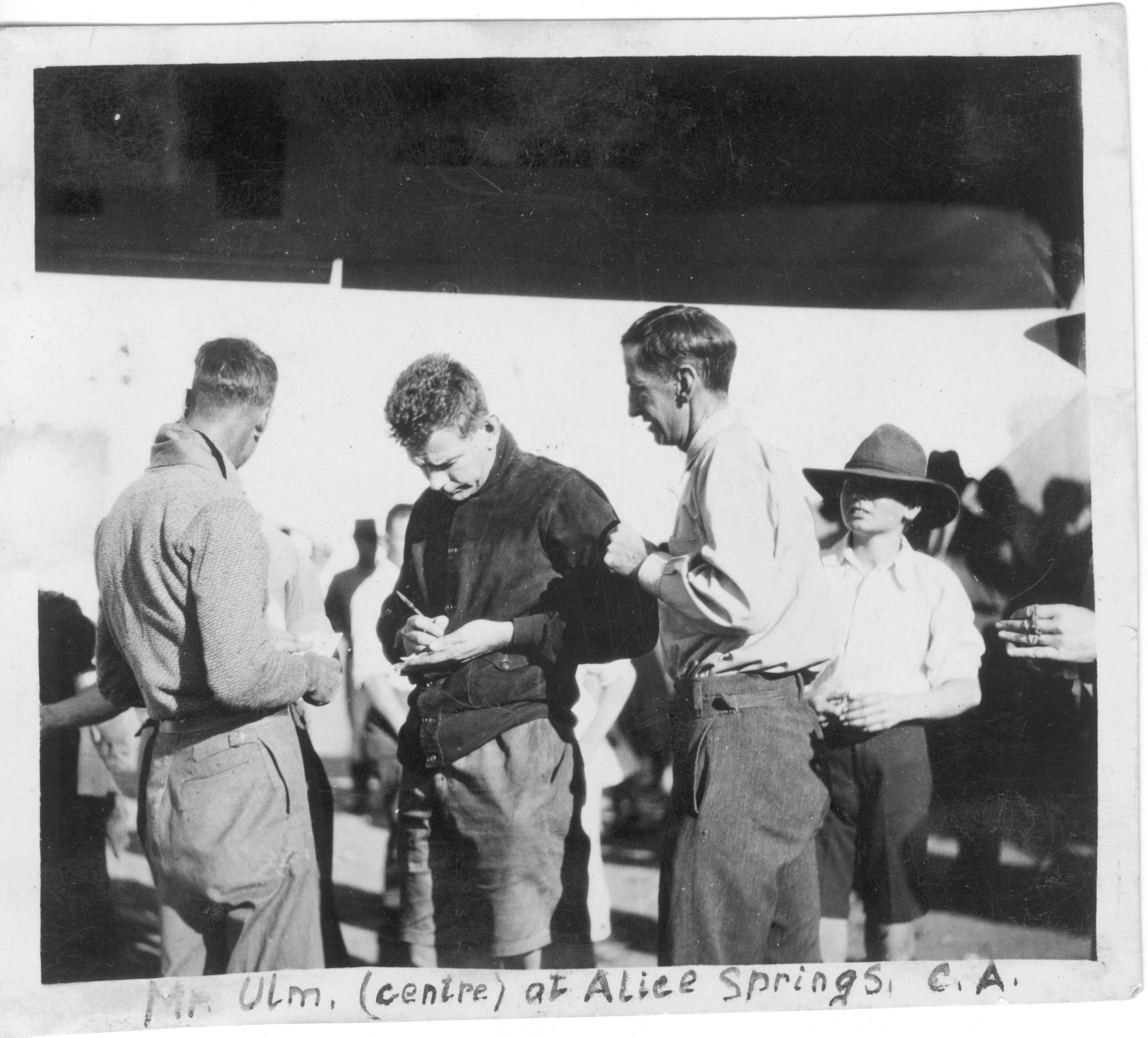
Ulm, centre, in Alice Springs, 1933

Ulm is best known for his partnership with Sir Charles Kingsford Smith, and was Kingsford Smith's copilot on many of his famous flights, including the 1928 first crossing of the Pacific in the Southern Cross. Ulm was the "business brains" in the partnership, and acquired the funding necessary for the journey. Ulm was also Kingsford Smith's partner in establishing Australian National Airways.

== Later ventures ==
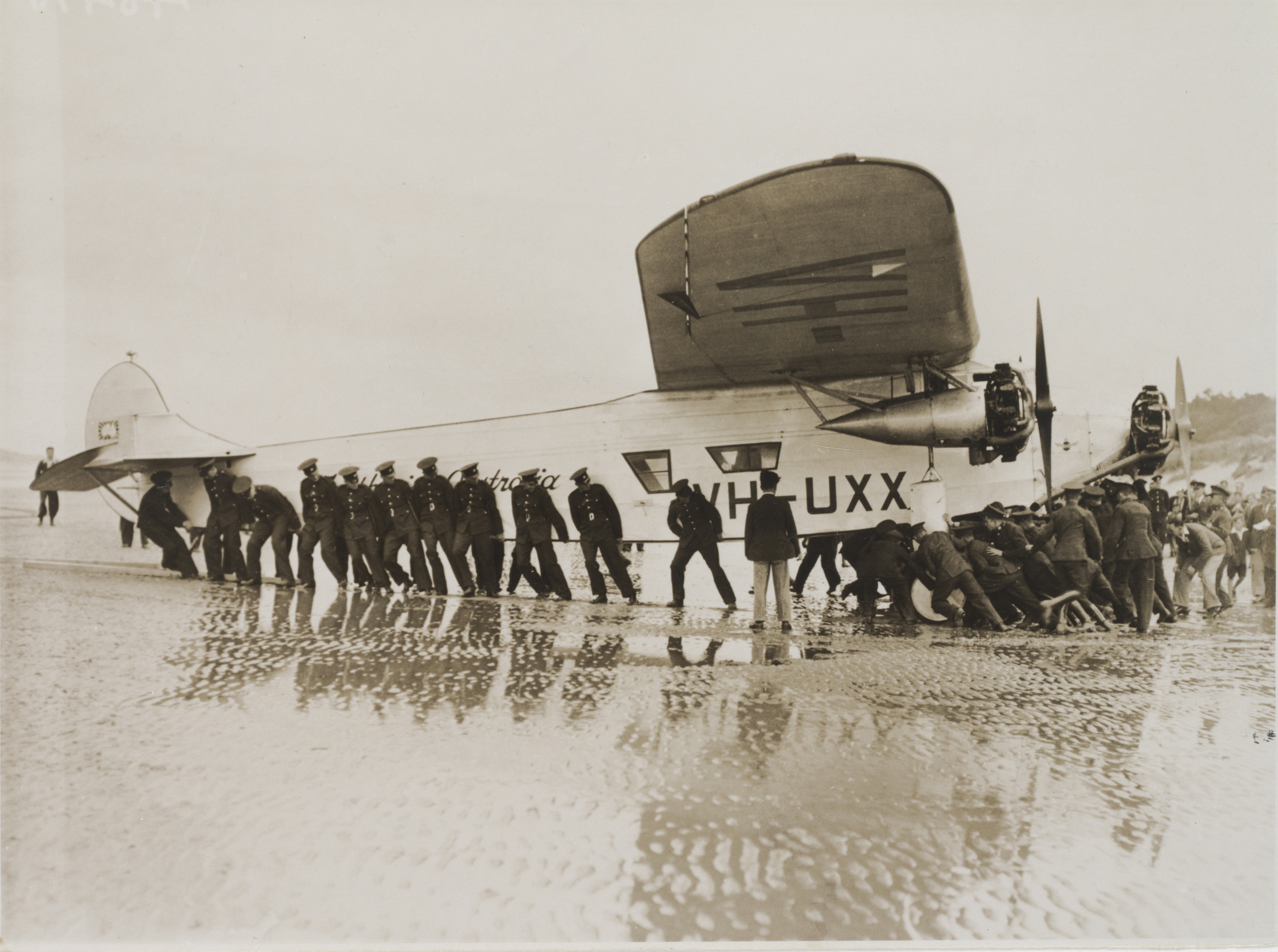
Faith in Australia after accident, Portmarnock Beach, Ireland, 1933

After the failure of Australian National Airways, Ulm bought one of the airline's Avro X aircraft for himself, and named it Faith in Australia. In this aircraft in 1933, Ulm set the speed record from England to Australia at 6 days, 17 hours and 56 minutes, and made several trans-Tasman flights.

In 1934, flying in Faith in Australia, Ulm carried the first official airmail from New Zealand to Australia, and the first official airmail delivery from Australia to Papua New Guinea.

=== Disappearance ===
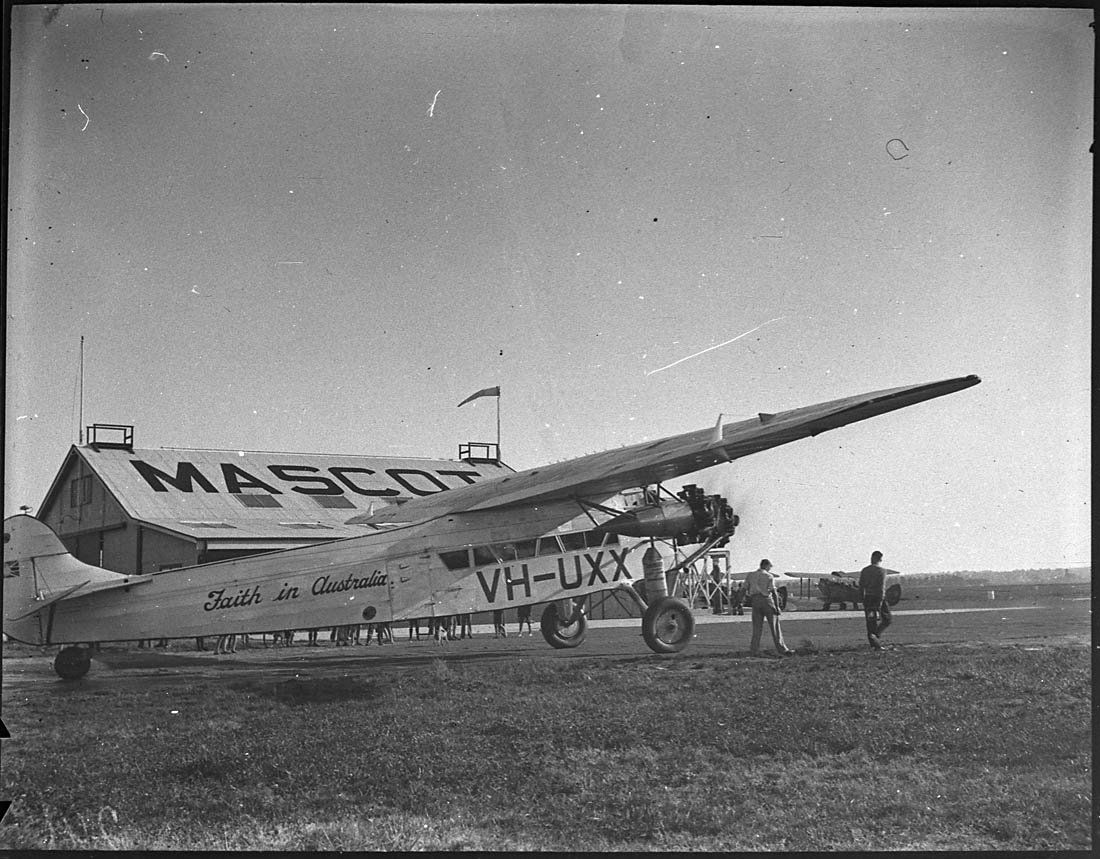
Charles Ulm's Avro-Fokker 10 aeroplane Faith in Australia, Kingsford-Smith Airport, Sydney, 2 September 1934

Ulm established a new company in September 1934, Great Pacific Airways Ltd, intending to operate a San Francisco-Sydney air service. Ulm disappeared in December 1934, together with copilot George Littlejohn and navigator Leon Skilling, on a test flight from Oakland, California to Hawaii in VH-UXY Stella Australis, an Airspeed Envoy. It is believed an unexpected tailwind and bad weather caused them to fly past the Hawaiian Islands in the dark. The wind was about 35 knots (65 km/h; 40 mph) from the south-southeast and the aircraft may also have been pushed north of the islands. At about 10 am local time on 3 December, after sending a series of Morse coded radio messages to Hawaii over five hours advising that they were lost and running out of fuel, the Envoy ditched into the sea. Despite an extensive and immediate search by aircraft and 23 naval ships, no trace of Stella Australis or her crew was ever found. Ulm had chosen not to carry a life raft on board, preferring to save weight and predicting that the aircraft would float for two days if it were forced to land on the water.

The plane had been customized by Airspeed to meet Ulm's own specifications; Airspeed's manager, Nevil Shute Norway, suggested in his autobiography that the internal cabin design may have contributed to the navigational problems, because the inexperienced navigator/wireless operator (who had been a ship's officer) had to sit in the rear compartment behind the large petrol tank and some distance from the pilot. Ulm communicated by speaking tube but could not see the charts or calculations (this arrangement had been chosen by Ulm instead of having the navigator in the cramped space in front of the tank with the pilot and co-pilot).

== Tributes ==
In 1978 Ulm was honoured on a postage stamp issued by Australia Post depicting him and the Southern Cross.

In November 2008 Qantas announced that it would name one of its Airbus A380s after Charles Ulm in recognition of his contribution to the aviation industry. This A380 (registration: VH-OQG) entered service on 3 November 2010.

Sydney Airport's former office building was known as the Charles Ulm Building. It was replaced by the Central Terrace Building in the 2000s.

In 2019 Sydney Airport announced that its two corporate office buildings would be renamed as part of the airport's centenary celebrations. As part of this change the former Customs House was renamed the Charles Ulm Building.

== See also ==
- List of people who disappeared mysteriously at sea
