= Roo (automobile) =

Defunct Australian automobile manufacturer

Roo Motor Car Manufacturing Company
- Type: Private
- Industry: Automotive
- Founded: 1917
- Founders: Rupert Jeffkins; W. B. Foulis
- Headquarters: Sydney, New South Wales, Australia
- Area served: Australia
- Products: Automobiles

Roo, formally the Roo Motor Car Manufacturing Company was an Australian company set up to produce automobiles from Australian-sourced components.

It was founded in 1917 by Rupert Jeffkins, a local car racing identity, and W. B. Foulis, a Sydney-based engineer.

Jeffkins had achieved international fame in 1912 as Ralph DePalma's riding mechanic in the second annual Indianapolis 500. They led for 195 (of 200) laps before a conrod tore a hole in the crankcase two laps from the end. Jeffkins and De Palma pushed the crippled car across the finish line in a futile endeavor that bought the crowd of 80,000 spectators to their feet. However, Indianapolis rules mandated that all entries move under their own power, so DePalma's final number of laps is recorded as 198, the push across the line bringing them only to the beginning of the final lap. They officially finished 11th. They received no prize money, but photographs of the dramatic push from the fourth turn to the finish line were published around the world.

Jeffkins returned to Australia in 1914 with films of the first two (1911 and 1912) Indy 500s. He toured the country narrating the films and publicizing his other American automobile exploits.

In 1917 Jeffkins and William B. Foulis built two prototype roadsters with minimalist two seater bodies, named by Lord Mayor of Sydney Richard Meagher, proudly promoting that every component was locally made. These featured twin cylinder, air cooled, horizontally opposed engines that were designed and built by Foulis. Jeffkins and Foulis used the first Roo for test and promotional tours of the Eastern States of Australia, driving from Melbourne to Sydney and back, averaging between 45 and 50 miles per gallon.

The company purchased land in Burwood for a factory but this was never built.

Once enough capital had been raised Jeffkins and Foulis planned to mass-produce two models, the "Raceabout" and a better equipped "Standard" that had more substantial bodywork and lower gearing. The "Raceabout" was meant to retail for the same price as a Model T Ford.

A third Roo was under construction when the solicitor. who was the major financial backer withdrew support, causing the collapse of the company.

Jeffkins attempted to revive the concept in 1929, but it did not progress beyond the blueprint stage.

Foulis produced the engines for the Southern Cross cars in the 1930s.

== See also ==
- List of automobile manufacturers
- List of car brands
