= Lady Southern Cross =

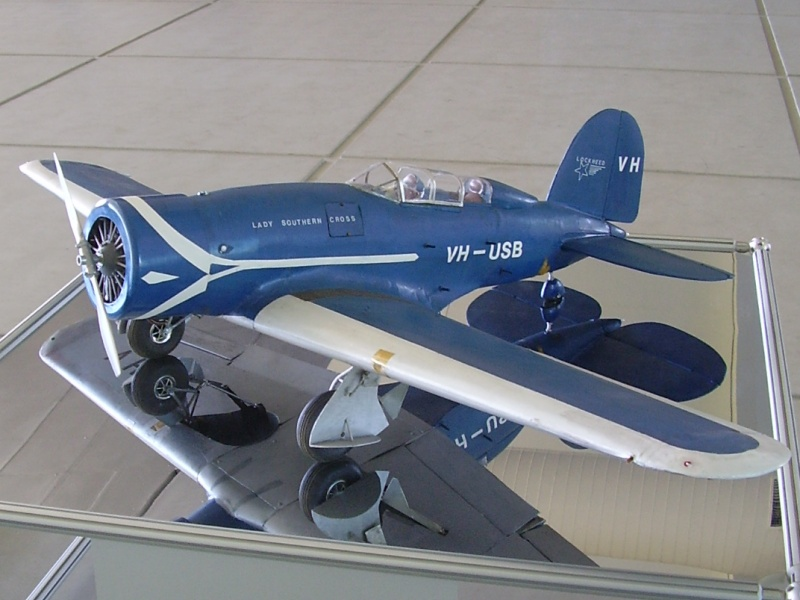
A model of the Lady Southern Cross on display near Brisbane Airport

The Lady Southern Cross was a Lockheed Altair monoplane owned by Australian pioneer aviator Sir Charles Kingsford Smith.

In this aircraft, Kingsford Smith made the first eastward trans-Pacific flight from Australia to the United States, in October and November of 1934.

== Delivery ==
In April 1934, Kingsford Smith ordered an aircraft from Lockheed for use in the MacRobertson Air Race in October of that year. The aircraft was rebuilt from a Lockheed Sirius originally built for George R. Hutchinson in 1930.

The aircraft was delivered by ship to Sydney, Australia in July 1934, bearing Kingsford Smith's requested blue livery and the name 'ANZAC'. However, before it could be flown in Australia, the Government objected to the commercial use of ANZAC (the use of which remains restricted in Australian law today), and Kingsford Smith was forced to remove it.

After finally getting the machine, now named Lady Southern Cross, out of Customs, Kingsford Smith and copilot Patrick Gordon Taylor set several speed records flying between Australian cities as they prepared to fly to England for the race. With all paperwork finally complete, they began the flight to England on 29 September 1934, with a first leg planned to end in Darwin. However, dust storms and stress failure of the engine cowling turned them back to Sydney, and they were forced to withdraw from the race. The race was subsequently won, and a new speed record set, by a British de Havilland DH.88 racing aircraft.

== Trans-Pacific flight ==
Now in financial trouble, and with the Lady Southern Cross facing withdrawal of its airworthiness certificate if it did not leave Australia, Kingsford Smith decided to attempt the first eastward crossing of the Pacific Ocean by aircraft, from Australia to the United States.

Kingsford Smith and Taylor departed Archerfield Airport on 21 October 1934, for the reverse journey from that the Southern Cross had made in 1928; Brisbane-Fiji-Hawaii-Oakland. Bad weather in Fiji and the need for extensive repairs to the fuel and oil systems in Hawaii meant the flight took considerably longer than the 1928 flight - 15 days vs 9 - despite the Altair being a much faster aircraft than the Fokker.

After arriving safely in Oakland on 4 November 1934, the Lady Southern Cross was left in the care of Lockheed at Burbank, California for repair, overhaul and storage.

== England-Australia ==
With the Lady Southern Cross substantially repaired and rebuilt in Burbank, Kingsford Smith flew cross-country to New York in September 1935 and had the Lady Southern Cross put on a ship to England. After obtaining a British airworthiness certificate, and having been turned back once by a hailstorm over Italy, Kingsford Smith and co-pilot Tommy Pethybridge left Croydon Airport in London on 6 November 1935 in an attempt to break the England to Australia speed record set during the MacRobertson Air Race.

== Disappearance ==
Kingsford Smith and Pethybridge were flying the Lady Southern Cross overnight from Allahabad, India, to Singapore (c.2200 mi.), while attempting to break the England-Australia speed record, when they disappeared over the Andaman Sea in the early hours of 8 November 1935. Aviator C.J. Melrose claimed to have seen the Lady Southern Cross fighting a storm 150 miles from shore and 200 feet over the sea with fire coming from its exhaust.

Eighteen months later, Burmese fishermen found an undercarriage leg and wheel (with its tyre still inflated) which had been washed ashore at Aye Island in the Gulf of Martaban, 3 km (2 mi) off the southeast coastline of Burma, some 137 km (85 mi) south of Mottama (formerly known as Martaban). Lockheed confirmed the undercarriage leg to be from the Lady Southern Cross. Botanists who examined the weeds clinging to the undercarriage leg estimated that the aircraft itself lies not far from the island at a depth of approximately 15 fathoms (90 ft; 27 m). The undercarriage leg is now on public display at the Powerhouse Museum in Sydney, Australia.

In 2009 a Sydney film crew claimed they were 100% certain they found the Lady Southern Cross. The location of the claimed find was widely mis-reported as "in the Bay of Bengal" - the 2009 search was at the same location where the landing gear had been found in 1937, at Aye Island, in the Andaman Sea. However, this claim was treated with scepticism by well-known businessman and pilot, Dick Smith, while Kingsford Smith's biographer, Ian Mackersey, described it as "complete nonsense".

== See also ==
- List of people who disappeared mysteriously at sea
- Southern Cross (aircraft)
