= Marks-Moir car =

Australian automobile (1921–1935)

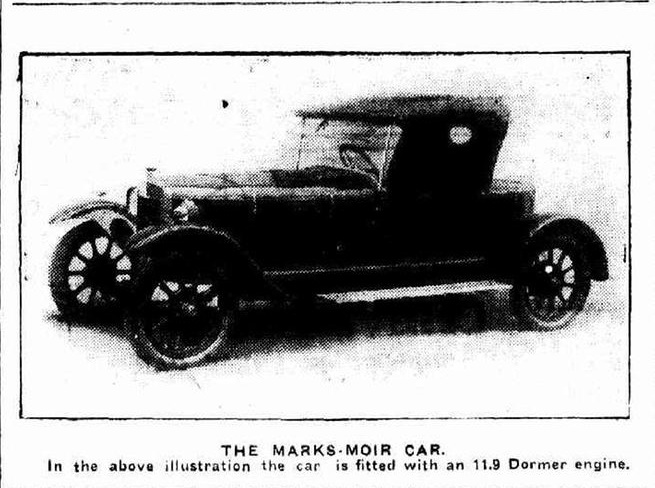
Marks-Moir car

The Marks-Moir car evolved through several iterations between 1921 and 1935. It was initially a collaboration between Dr A.R. Marks and W. Moir who designed an unconventional, chassis-less car to be manufactured in Australia. The original design was built in England in 1922. It was a two-seater that featured a body made of laminated wood. The motor, supplied by Wolsely, was mounted longitudinally behind the front seats. Two chains took the drive to the solid rear axle and differential action occurred within the rear wheel hubs. This increased ground clearance and minimized power loss compared to more orthodox driveline configurations. It was exhibited at Australia House in London for some months before Marks and Moir bought the prototype and some components to Australia.

After attempts to raise finance for further development, another car was built by Scienne's Engineering Company of Botany. This vehicle featured a front-mounted engine.

== Timeline ==
- In 1922 Prototype built in England.
- In 1928 James Stormonth attempted to produce the vehicle under license as the "Stormon".
- In 1930 Moir drove the "fourth" Marks-Moir to Canberra to meet with Cabinet Ministers in an effort to get backing for the venture.
- In 1932 the Marks Motor Construction Company was formed. It was a partnership between James Marks, the son of the original designer, William Foulis, builder of the "Roo" motorcar engine, Edward George Neaves, Stanley Stranger and George Hilliard.
- In 1933 Sir Charles Kingsford Smith became Chairman and the name of the design was changed to Southern Cross.

== See also ==
- Southern Cross (automobile)
