= Cowra Free Press =

Australian English language newspaper (1878–1937)

Cowra Free Press, front page, 7 January 1911

The Cowra Free Press was a semi-weekly English language newspaper published from 1878 to 1937 in Cowra, New South Wales, Australia.

== History ==
The Cowra Free Press was established in 1878 by proprietor Joseph Charles Ryall, who remained associated with the paper until he died, aged 91, in 1935. The first issues of the paper were published at the office of The Grenfell Record and Lachlan District Advertiser. After Ryall's death, the paper was published by family members, with his son, R. J. Ryall as manager and editor. In April 1937 the paper was sold to Earnest Rowland Moulten and Mr R. J. Neve. On 1 June 1937 the paper was renamed the Lachlan Leader "with which is incorporated the Cowra Free Press". The Lachlan Leader was absorbed by the Cowra Guardian in October 1943.

== Digitisation ==
The Cowra Free Press has been digitised as part of the Australian Newspapers Digitisation Program of the National Library of Australia.

== See also ==
- List of newspapers in New South Wales
