= The Old Bus =

- Promotional material
- Directed by: Jack Percival Junior
- Based on: The Old Bus biography (1932) by Sir Charles Kingsford Smith
- Produced by: Jack Percival Junior
- Starring: Sir Charles Kingsford Smith
- Edited by: Jack Percival Junior
- Distributed by: Universal Pictures (as Universal Pictures Corporation)
- Release date: 10 August 1934
- Country: Australia
- Language: English
- Box office: £1,650

The Old Bus is a 1934 Australian documentary film about Australian contributions to flying, focusing on aviator Sir Charles Kingsford Smith, and derived from his 1932 book of the same name. The film takes its title from his famous Fokker F.VII/3m monoplane aircraft, The Southern Cross, that Kingsford Smith nicknamed "The Old Bus".

== Synopsis ==
The Old Bus traces Australian contributions to flying from 1894 on, including the feats of Lawrence Hargrave, an early flight of Harry Houdini in 1910, W.E. Hart's flight from Sydney to Penrith, Guillaux's 1914 flight in Sydney, the work of Ross and Keith Smith, and Australian flying inventions.

The film then covers the personal story of Sir Charles Kingsford Smith and his aircraft, The Southern Cross, in particular, his circumnavigation of the world. Kingsford Smith recreates some of the famous flights in which he was involved. The Old Bus also touches on the development of the Australian postal air route.

== Production ==
The Old Bus was produced by Jack Percival Junior, the aviation correspondent of The Sydney Morning Herald under the supervision of Kingsford Smith. Percival was also a passenger on The Southern Cross for a flight Kingsford Smith made from Australia to New Zealand in January 1933. (Note: Jack Percival Junior gained fame, when he and his wife, and later, a son, were interned by the Japanese in Manila.)

Plans to make a documentary about Kingsford Smith were announced in August 1933. The project soon expanded to be a history of Australian aviation. Kingsford Smith shot footage of it all around the world. Shooting commenced around November 1933 and was completed by July 1934.

== Reception ==
The Old Bus achieved cinema release through Universal Pictures. Reviews were generally positive, the critic from The Sydney Morning Herald calling it "a plain, unassuming record of Australian achievements in aviation ... a comfortable feature of the film is that it contains no bombast. Indeed, it might be argued that the producers have been too modest, and have not emphasised enough the remarkable exploits of the 'Southern Cross' and its captain, and the importance of its flights in the wider history of aviation."

By December 1934, The Old Bus had earned an estimated £1,650 at the Australian box office with trade papers estimating this figure may reach £3,500. Because of the low production cost it is likely the film made a profit.

Percival later said he wished to make a feature film called Outposts set in the Northern Territory, Broome, Java, Sumatra, and New Guinea, starring Captain Patrick Gordon Taylor. This film was not made.
