= Charles Kingsford Smith =

Australian aviator (1897–1935)

Sir Charles Kingsford Smith MC AFC
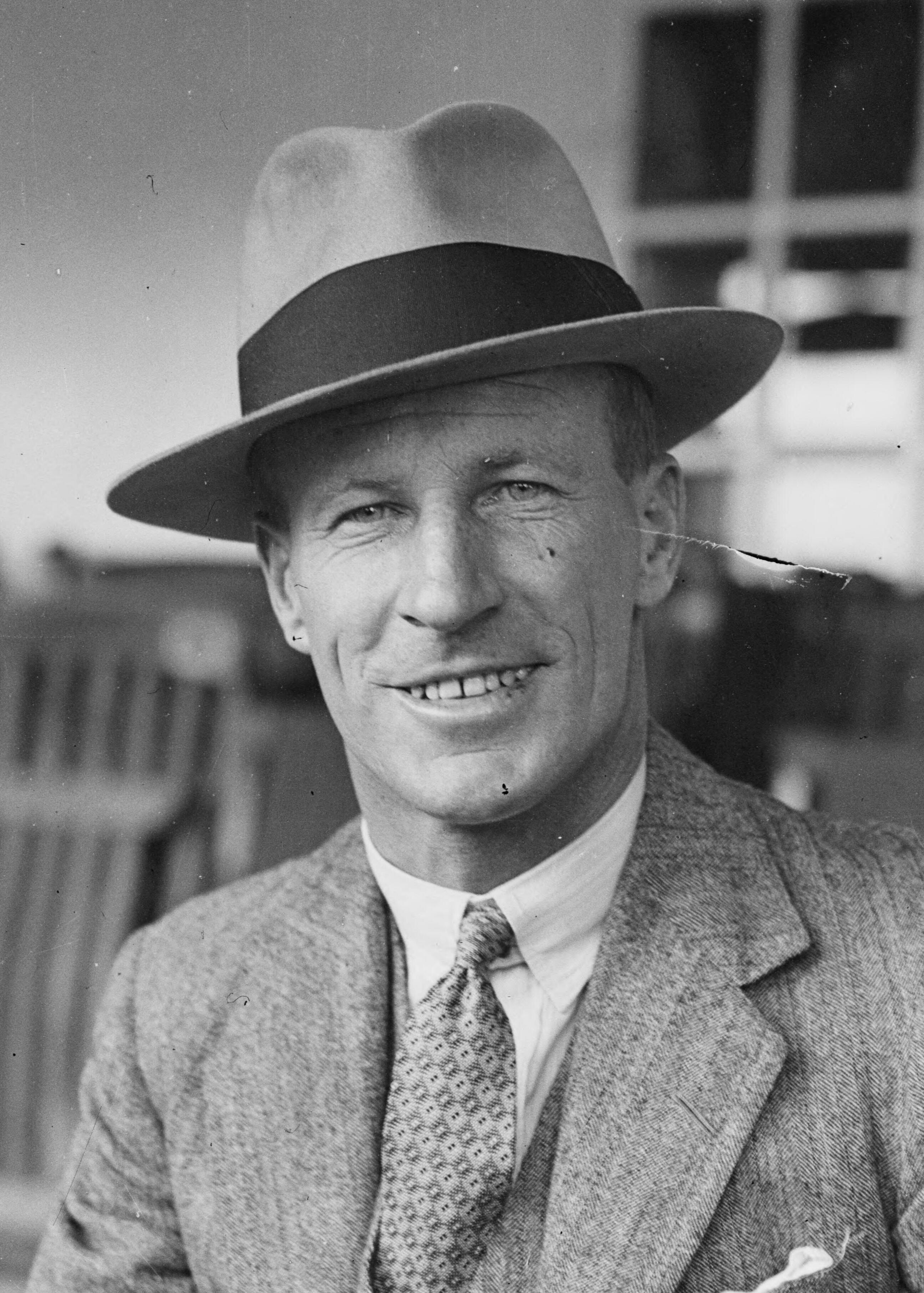
- Kingsford Smith in 1932
- Born: Charles Edward Kingsford Smith; 9 February 1897; Brisbane, Colony of Queensland
- Died: 8 November 1935 (aged 38); Andaman Sea
- Cause of death: Crashed in the sea off Burma
- Other name: Smithy
- Known for: First non-stop crossing of the Australian mainland; Trans-Pacific flight; England to Australia air race
- Awards: Knight Bachelor; Military Cross; Air Force Cross; Segrave Trophy
- Aviation career
- Air force: Australian Flying Corps; Royal Flying Corps; Royal Air Force
- Battles: World War I; Gallipoli campaign; Western Front
- Rank: Captain (substantive); Air commodore (honorary)

Sir Charles Edward Kingsford Smith MC AFC (9 February 1897 – 8 November 1935), nicknamed Smithy, was an Australian aviation pioneer. He piloted the first transpacific flight and the first flight between Australia and New Zealand.

Kingsford Smith was born in Brisbane. He grew up in Sydney, leaving school at the age of 16 and becoming an engineering apprentice. He joined the Australian Army in 1915 and was a motorcycle despatch rider on the Gallipoli campaign. He later transferred to the Royal Flying Corps and was awarded the Military Cross in 1917 after being shot down. After the war's end, Kingsford Smith worked as a barnstormer in England and the United States before returning to Australia in 1921. He subsequently joined West Australian Airways as one of the country's first commercial pilots.

In 1928, Kingsford Smith completed the first transpacific flight, a three-leg journey from California to Brisbane via Hawaii and Fiji. He and his co-pilot Charles Ulm became celebrities, together with crew members James Warner and Harry Lyon. In the same year he and Ulm completed the first non-stop flight across Australia from Melbourne to Perth and the first non-stop flight from Australia to New Zealand. They subsequently established Australian National Airways, but the airline and Kingsford Smith's other business ventures failed to achieve commercial success. He continued to participate in air races and to attempt other aviation feats.

In 1935, Kingsford Smith and his co-pilot Tommy Pethybridge disappeared over the Andaman Sea while attempting to break the Australia–England speed record. He was fêted as a national hero during the Great Depression and received numerous honours during his lifetime. After his death Sydney's primary airport was named in his memory and he was featured on the Australian twenty-dollar note for several decades.

== Early and personal life ==
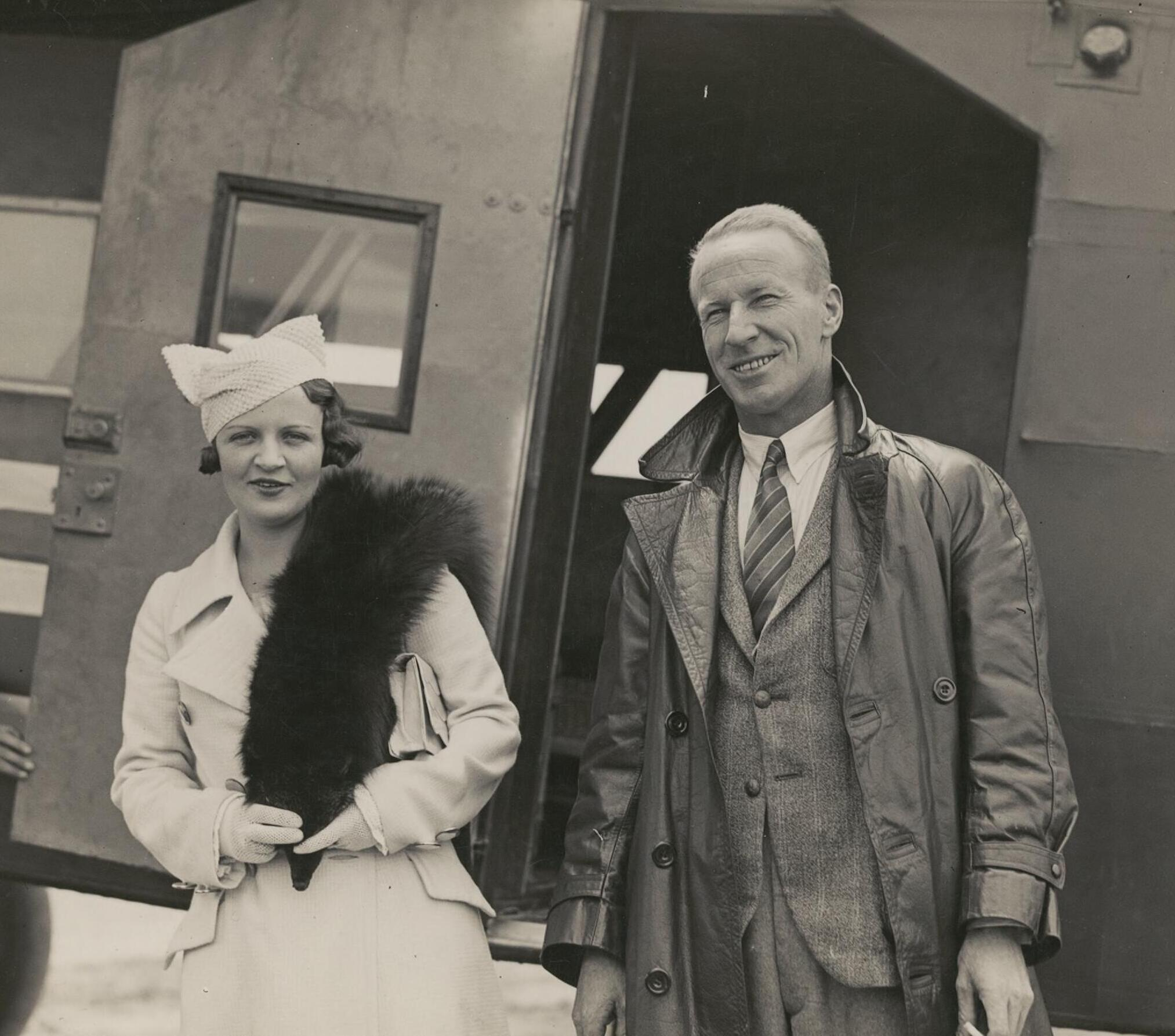
Kingsford Smith and his second wife Mary in Wellington, New Zealand

Charles Edward Kingsford Smith was born on 9 February 1897 at Riverview Terrace, Hamilton in Brisbane, Colony of Queensland, the son of William Charles Smith and his wife Catherine Mary (née Kingsford, daughter of Richard Ash Kingsford, a Member of the Queensland Legislative Assembly and mayor in both Brisbane and Cairns municipal councils). His birth was officially registered and announced in the newspapers under the surname Smith, which his family used at that time. The earliest use of the surname Kingsford Smith appears to be by his older brother Richard Harold Kingsford Smith, who used the name at least informally from 1901, although he married in New South Wales under the surname Smith in 1903.

In 1903, his parents moved to Canada where they adopted the surname Kingsford Smith. They returned to Sydney in 1907.

Kingsford Smith first attended school in Vancouver, Canada. From 1909 to 1911, he was enrolled at St Andrew's Cathedral School, Sydney, where he was a chorister in the school's cathedral choir, and then at Sydney Technical High School, before becoming an engineering apprentice with the Colonial Sugar Refining Company at 16.

=== Childhood swimming accident ===
On 2 January 1907, Smith was swept out to sea by a strong undertow at Bondi Beach and nearly drowned. He was pulled ashore by lifeguards and revived by a nurse who happened to be around.

=== Marriage ===
Kingsford Smith married Thelma Eileen Hope Corboy in 1923. They divorced in 1929. He married Mary Powell in December 1930.

=== New Guard ===
Shortly after his second marriage he joined the New Guard, a radical monarchist, anti-communist, and fascist-inspired organisation.

== World War I and early flying experience ==
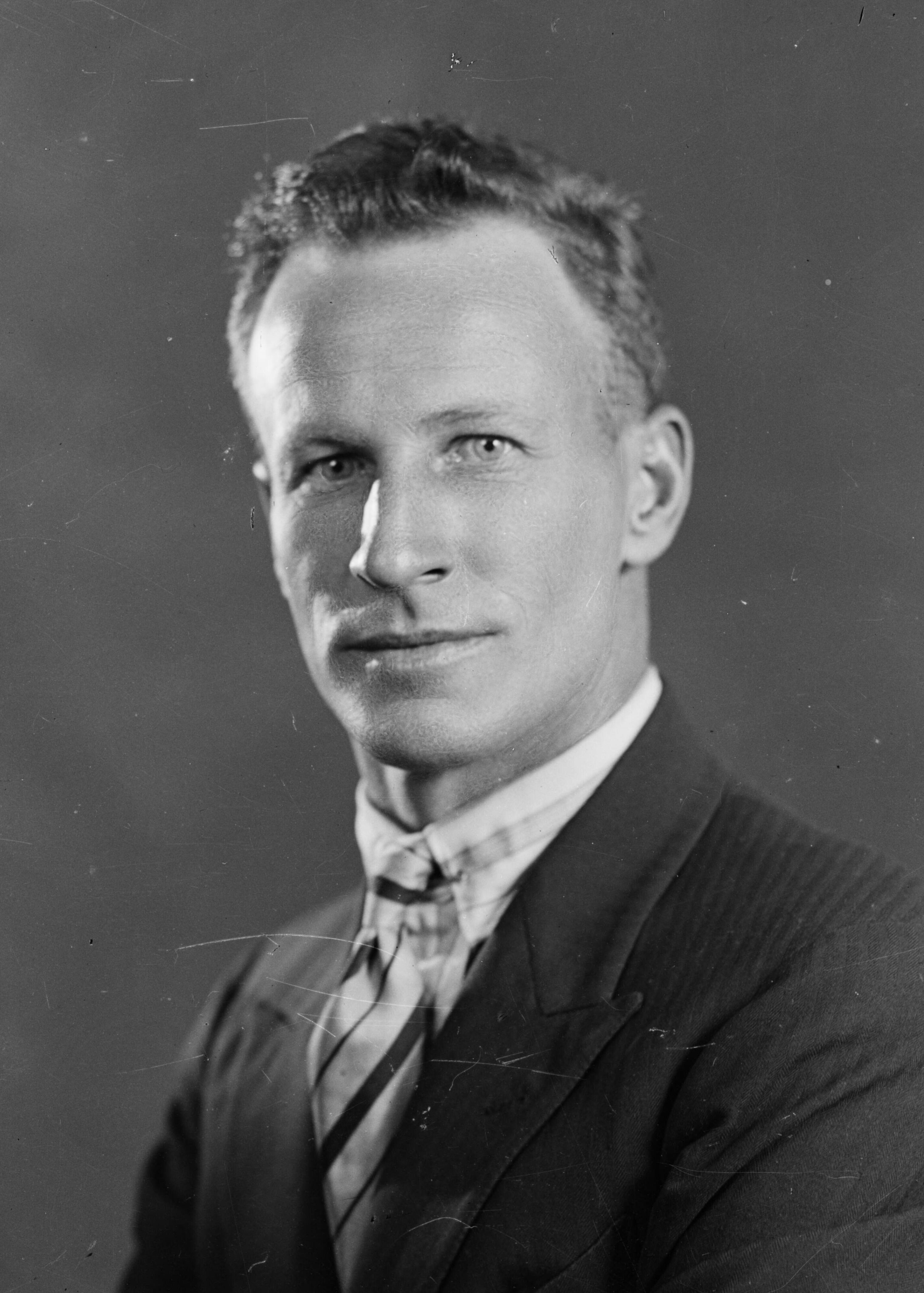
Kingsford Smith c. 1920

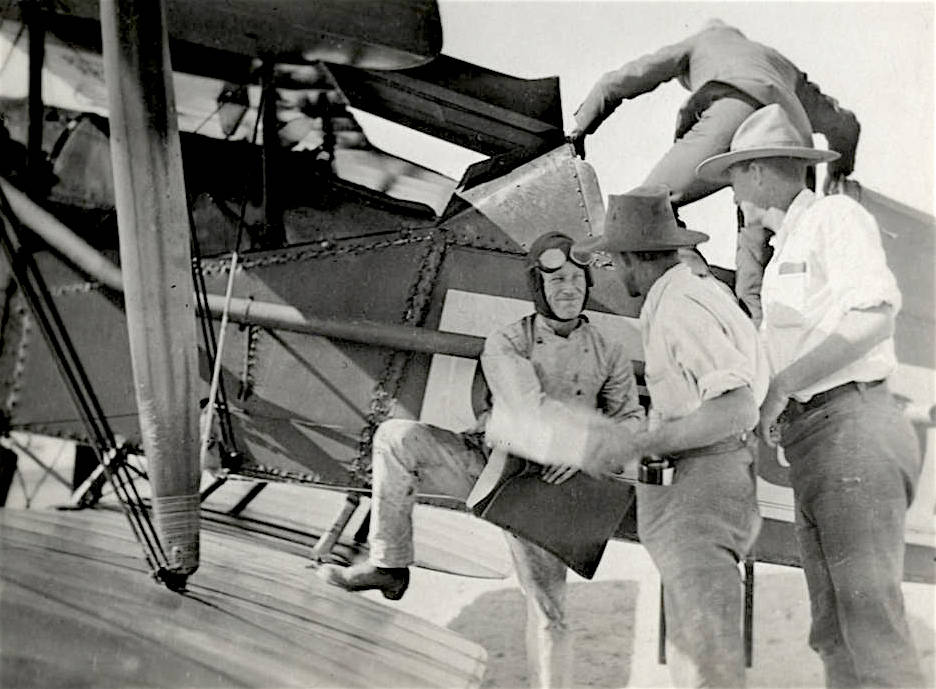
Kingsford-Smith at Wallal

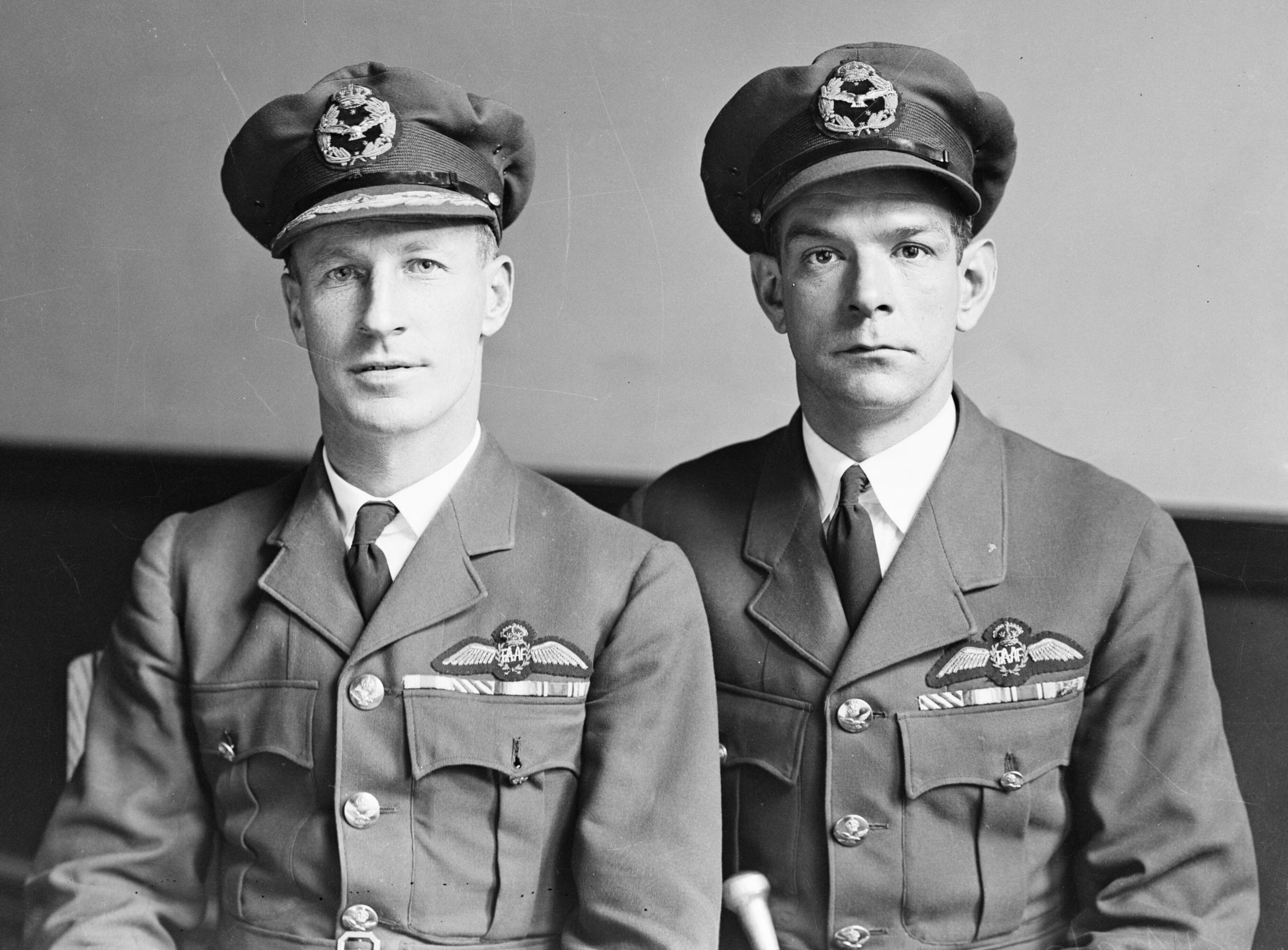
Kingsford Smith and Charles Ulm in RAAF uniform

In 1915, he enlisted for duty in the 1st AIF (Australian Army) and served at Gallipoli. Initially, he performed duty as a motorcycle dispatch rider, before transferring to the Royal Flying Corps, earning his pilot's wings in 1917.

In August 1917, while serving with No. 23 Squadron, Kingsford Smith was shot down and received injuries which required amputation of two toes. He was awarded the Military Cross for his gallantry in battle. As his recovery was predicted to be lengthy, Kingsford Smith was permitted to take leave in Australia where he visited his parents. Returning to England, Kingsford Smith was assigned to instructor duties and promoted to Captain.

On 1 April 1918, along with other members of the Royal Flying Corps, Kingsford Smith was transferred to the newly established Royal Air Force. On being demobilised in England, in early 1919, he joined Tasmanian Cyril Maddocks, to form Kingsford Smith, Maddocks Aeros Ltd, flying a joy-riding service mainly in the North of England, during the summer of 1919, initially using surplus DH.6 trainers, then surplus B.E.2s. Later Kingsford Smith worked as a barnstormer in the United States before returning to Australia in 1921.

Applying for a commercial pilot's licence on 2 June 1921, he gave his name as "Charles Edward Kingsford-Smith".

The Cowra Free Press told how Kingsford Smith flew under the Lachlan road bridge at Cowra, New South Wales, with local "crack motorist" Ken Richards. It went on to recount how Kingsford Smith was preparing to also fly under the nearby railway bridge, but was warned by Richards of telegraph wires just in time to prevent a catastrophe. Richards, they added, was a mate of Kingsford Smith, and had flown with him several times in France. In this version of events, the feat was accomplished "just after the Armistice" (11 November 1918), but may have been in July 1921, when Kingsford Smith was hosting "joy flights" there, in an aircraft owned by the Diggers' Cooperative Aviation Company. Later accounts have embellished the story.

He became one of Australia's first airline pilots when he was chosen by Norman Brearley to fly for the newly formed West Australian Airways, and piloted their Bristol Type 28 Coupe Tourers plane (G-AUDF) that made bi-weekly mail drops to the astronomers during the 1922 Solar Eclipse expedition at Wallal, Western Australia. Around this time he began to plan his record-breaking flight across the Pacific.

== 1927 Circumnavigation of Australia ==
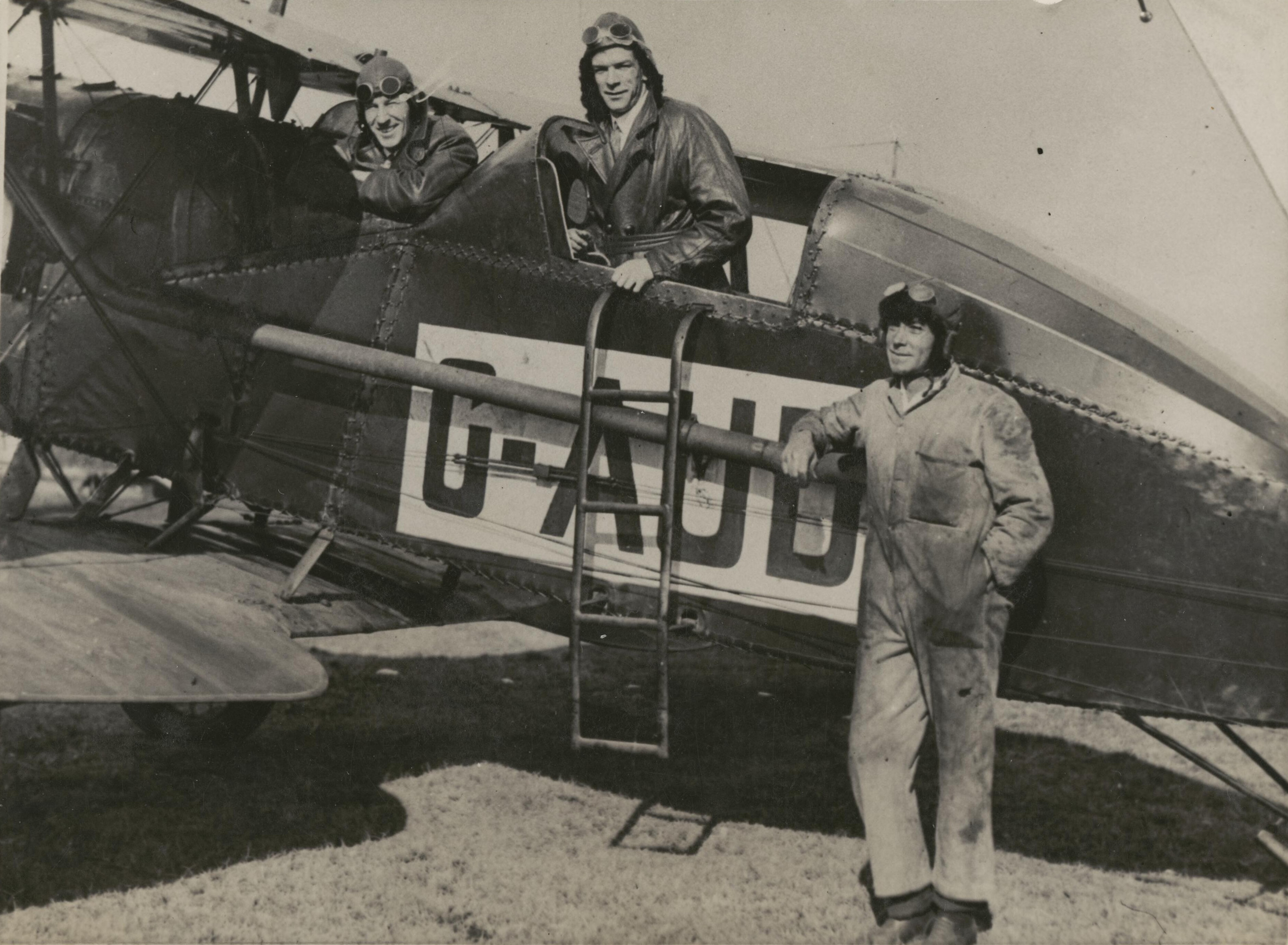
Charles Kingsford Smith, and Charles Ulm with the Bristol Tourer G-AUDJ in 1927, photographed with Bob Hitchcock who flew a separate round-Australia flight.

In June 1927, Kingsford Smith and Charles Ulm circumnavigated the Australian continent in ten days and five hours, beating the previous record by 12 days, in a Bristol Tourer plane.

In parallel with Kingsford Smith's record-setting flight, pilot Keith Anderson and mechanic Bob Hitchcock undertook a separate round-Australia journey in a Bristol Tourer, departing Brisbane on 25 June 1927, and taking 14 days.

== 1928 Trans-Pacific flight ==
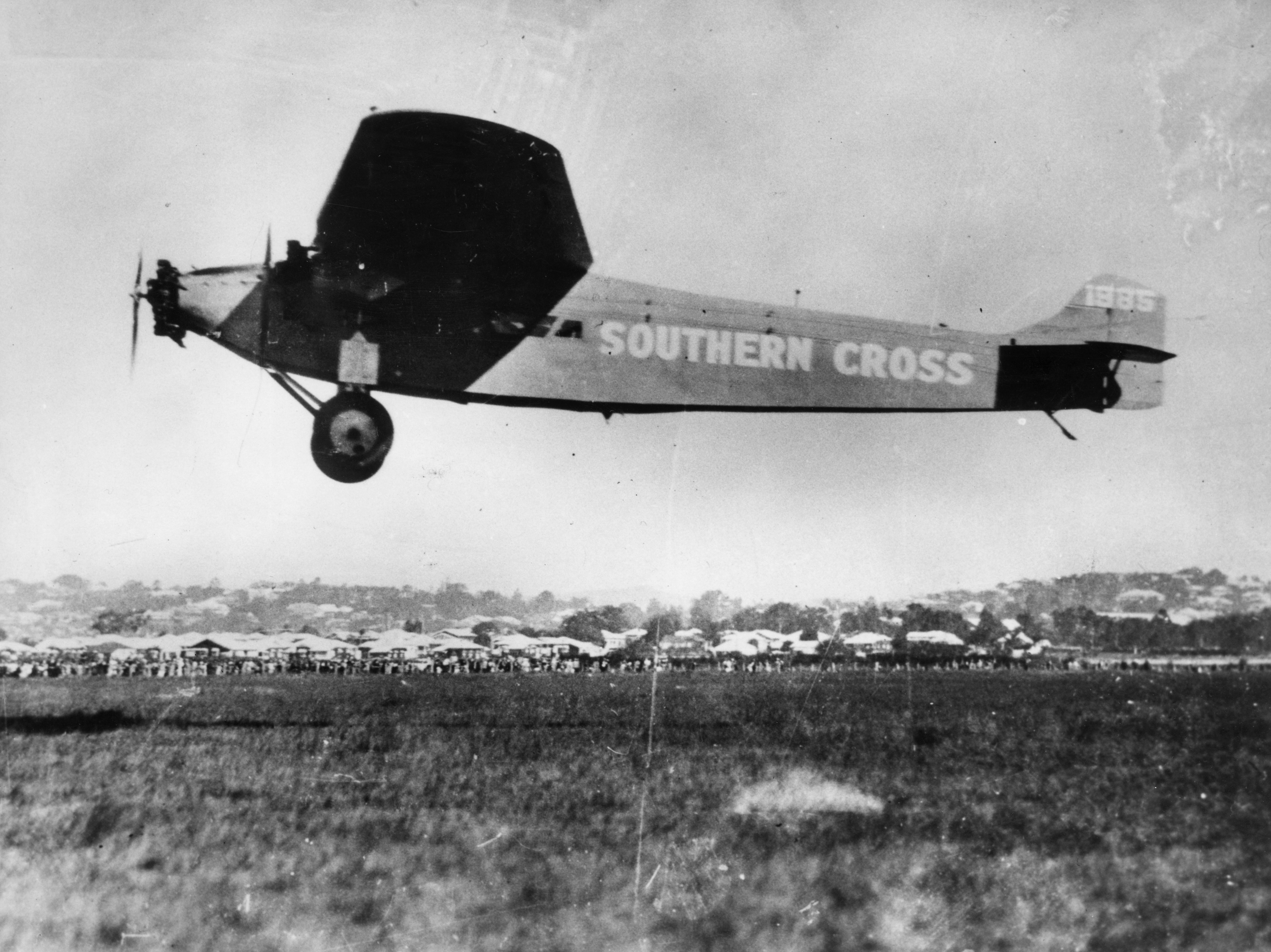
Southern Cross 1928

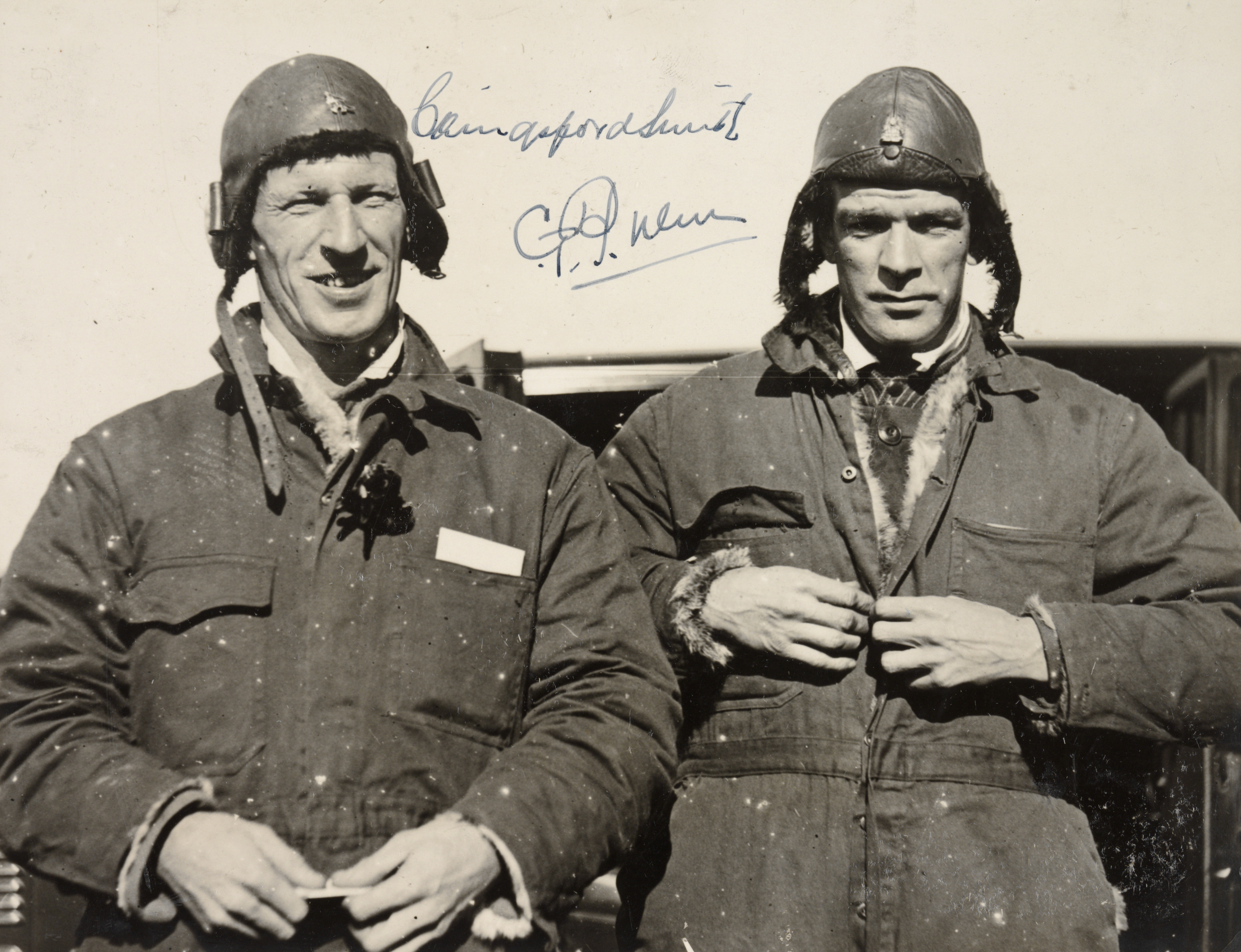
Charles Kingsford-Smith and Charles Ulm, on landing after the first trans-Pacific flight, Mascot, 10 June 1928

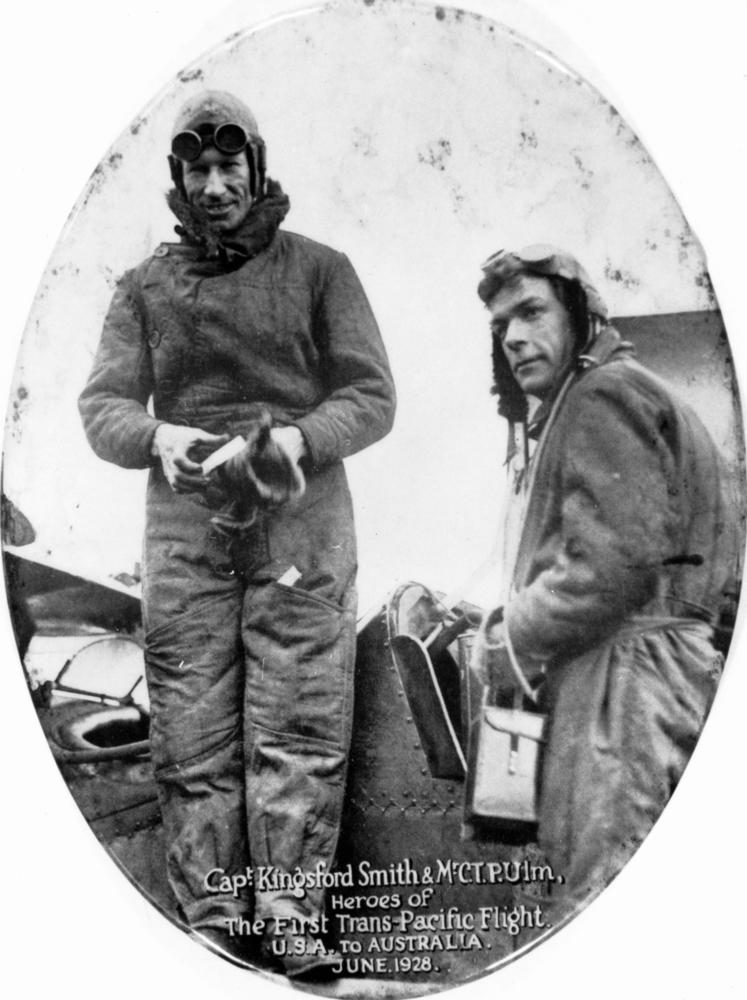
A photograph commemorating the first trans-Pacific flight.

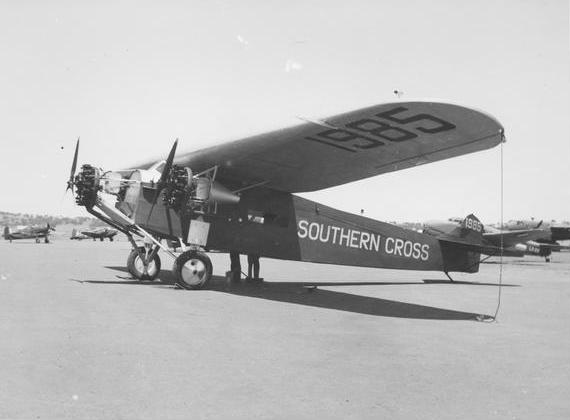
The Southern Cross at an RAAF base near Canberra in 1943.

In 1928, Kingsford Smith and Charles Ulm arrived in the United States and began to search for an aircraft. Famed Australian polar explorer Sir Hubert Wilkins sold them a Fokker F.VII/3m monoplane, which they named the Southern Cross.

At 8:54 a.m. on 31 May 1928, Kingsford Smith and his 4-man crew left Oakland, California, to attempt the first trans-Pacific flight to Australia. The flight was in three stages. The first, from Oakland to Wheeler Army Airfield, Hawaii, was 3,870 kilometres (2,400 mi), taking an uneventful 27 hours 25 minutes (87.54 mph). They took off from Barking Sands on Mana, Kauai, since the runway at Wheeler was not long enough. They headed for Suva, Fiji, 5,077 kilometres (3,155 mi) away, taking 34 hours 30 minutes (91.45 mph). This was the most demanding portion of the journey, as they flew through a massive lightning storm near the equator. The third leg was the shortest, 2,709 kilometres (1,683 mi) in 20 hours (84.15 mph), and crossed the Australian coastline near Ballina before turning north to fly 170 kilometres (110 mi) to Brisbane, where they landed at 10.50 a.m. on 9 June. The total flight distance was approximately 11,566 kilometres (7,187 mi). Kingsford Smith was met by a huge crowd of 26,000 at Eagle Farm Airport, and was welcomed as a hero. Australian aviator Charles Ulm was the relief pilot. The other crewmen were Americans radio operator James Warner and navigator and engineer Harry Lyon.

The National Film and Sound Archive of Australia has a film biography of Kingsford Smith, called An Airman Remembers, and recordings of Kingsford Smith and Ulm talking about the journey.

Stamp sheet, released in Australia in 1978 in commemoration of the 50th anniversary of the first Trans-Pacific flight

A stamp sheet and stamps, featuring the Australian aviators Kingsford Smith and Ulm, were released by Australia Post in 1978, commemorating the 50th anniversary of the flight.

A young New Zealander named Jean Batten attended a dinner in Australia featuring Kingsford Smith after the trans-Pacific flight and told him "I'm going to learn to fly." She later convinced him to take her for a flight in the Southern Cross and went on to become a record-setting aviator, following his example instead of his advice ("Don't attempt to break men's records – and don't fly at night", he told her in 1928 and remembered wryly later).

== 1928 Trans-Tasman flight ==
After making the first non-stop flight across Australia from Point Cook near Melbourne to Perth in Western Australia in August 1928, Kingsford Smith and Ulm registered themselves as Australian National Airways (see below). They then decided to attempt the Tasman Sea crossing to New Zealand not only because it had not yet been done, but also in the hope the Australian Government would grant Australian National Airways a subsidised contract to carry scheduled mail regularly. The Tasman had remained unflown after the failure of the first attempt in January 1928, when New Zealanders John Moncrieff and George Hood had vanished without a trace.

Kingsford Smith's flight was planned for take off from Richmond, near Sydney, on Sunday 2 September 1928, with a scheduled landing around 9:00 a.m. on 3 September at Wigram Aerodrome, near Christchurch, the principal city in the South Island of New Zealand. This plan drew a storm of protest from New Zealand churchmen about the "sanctity of the Sabbath being set at naught."

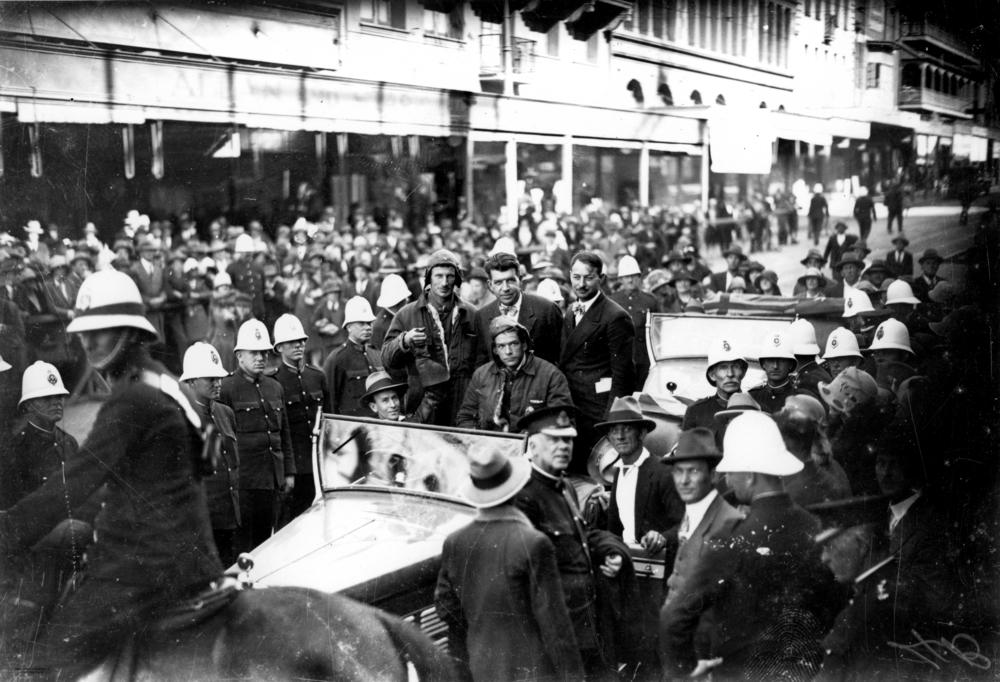
People lined up along a Brisbane street to see Sir Charles Kingsford Smith, 1928

The mayor of Christchurch supported the churchmen and cabled a protest to Kingsford Smith. As it happened, unfavourable weather developed over the Tasman and the flight was deferred, so it is not known whether or how Kingsford Smith would have heeded the cable.

Accompanied by Ulm, navigator Harold Arthur Litchfield, and radio operator Thomas H. McWilliams, a New Zealander made available by the New Zealand Government, Kingsford Smith left Richmond in the evening of 10 September, planning to fly overnight to a daylight landing after a flight of about 14 hours. The 2,600 kilometres (1,600 mi) planned route was only just over half the distance between Hawaii and Fiji. After a stormy flight, at times through icing conditions, the Southern Cross made landfall in much improved weather near Cook Strait, the passage between New Zealand's two main islands. At an estimated 241 kilometres (150 mi) out from New Zealand, the crew dropped a wreath in memory of the two New Zealanders who had disappeared during their attempt to cross the Tasman Sea earlier that year.

There was a tremendous welcome in Christchurch, where the Southern Cross landed at 0922 after a flight of 14 hours and 25 minutes. About 30,000 people made their way to Wigram, including many students from state schools, who were given the day off, and public servants, who were granted leave until 11 a.m. The event was also broadcast live on radio.

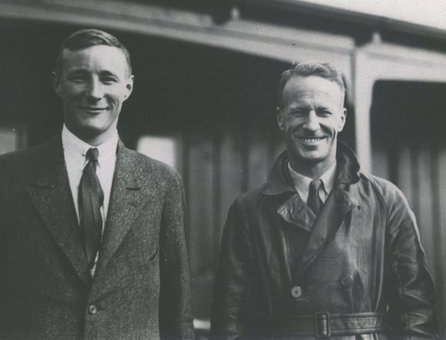
Charles Kingsford Smith (right) with Southland aerodrome founder John Howard Marcus Smith (left) at Invercargill, New Zealand (1933)

While the New Zealand Air Force overhauled the Southern Cross free of charge, Kingsford Smith and Ulm were taken on a triumphant tour of New Zealand, flying in Bristol Fighters.

The return to Sydney was made from Blenheim, a small city at the north of the South Island. Hampered by fog, severe weather and a minor navigational error, the flight to Richmond took over 23 hours; on touchdown, the aircraft had enough fuel for only another 10 minutes flying.

== 1929 "Coffee Royal" tragedy ==
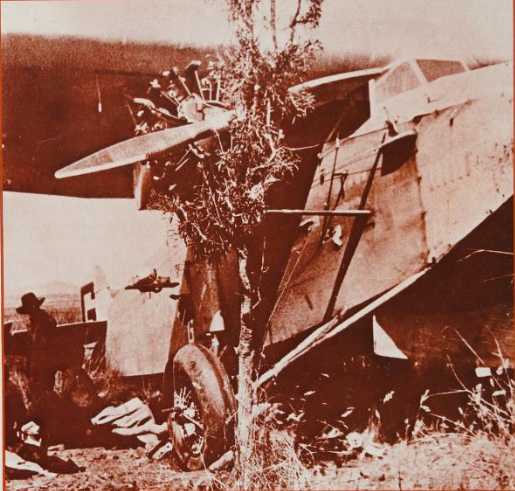
The Southern Cross following rescue from Coffee Royal in 1929.

Kingsford Smith, Charles Ulm, Harold A. Litchfield (navigator), and Thomas McWilliams (wireless operator) took off in the Southern Cross from Richmond airfield for Wyndham, Western Australia on 30 March 1929, the first leg of an intended flight to London. They lost their way in a rainstorm, ran low on fuel, and around midday, 31 March, radioed that they were putting down some 150 miles (240 km) short of their objective, on an area later dubbed "Coffee Royal" by the aviators.

By 3 April, four or five planes had been deployed in the search for the missing airmen, made difficult with very little information on their whereabouts. These planes only had a cruising range of four hours and found no trace of the missing crew.

A former business partner of Kingsford Smith, Keith Anderson, together with mechanic Henry Smith 'Bobby' Hitchcock joined the search for the Southern Cross. On 7 April they took off from Richmond airstrip in their aeroplane 'Kookaburra', but never returned. Kingsford Smith and his crew were all rescued five days later, but Anderson and Hitchcock were still missing. They and their plane were eventually found in the Tanami desert on 23 April, both men having perished from thirst whilst trying to clear a runway for take-off

== Australian National Airways ==
In partnership with Ulm, Kingsford Smith established Australian National Airways in 1929. The passenger, mail and freight service commenced operations flying between Sydney, Brisbane and Melbourne, in January 1930, with five aircraft but closed after crashes in March and November the next year.

== Later flights, the MacRobertson Air Race, the 1934 Pacific Flight ==
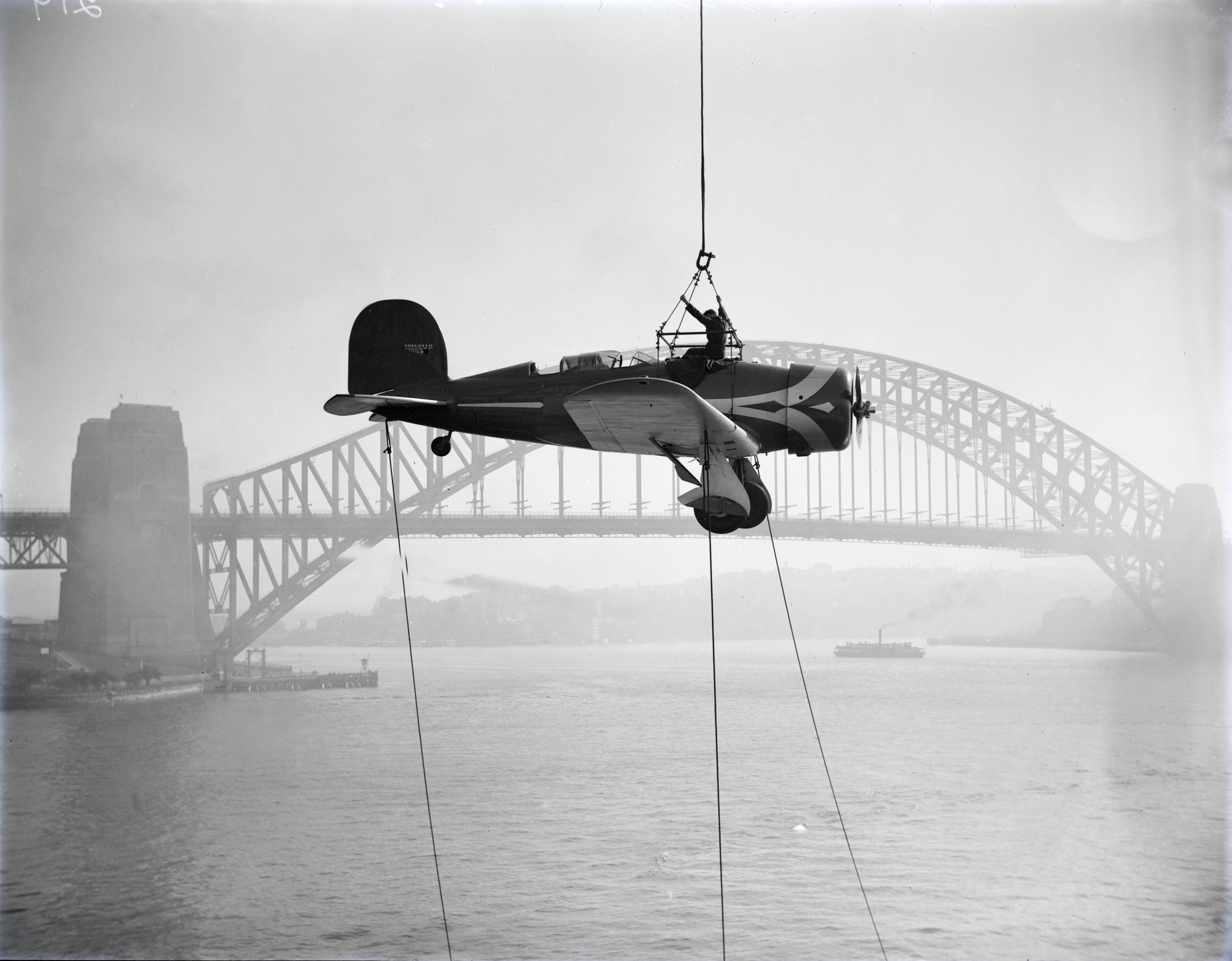
Smithy's Lockheed Altair, Sydney, 17 July 1934

After collecting his 'old bus', Southern Cross, from the Fokker aircraft company in the Netherlands where it had been overhauled, in June 1930 he achieved an east–west crossing of the Atlantic from Ireland to Newfoundland in 31 1/2 hours, having taken off from Portmarnock Beach (The Velvet Strand), just north of Dublin. New York gave him a tumultuous welcome. The Southern Cross continued on to Oakland, California, completing a circumnavigation of the world, begun in 1928. In 1930, he competed in an England to Australia air race, and, flying solo, won the event taking 13 days. He arrived in Sydney on 22 October 1930.

In 1931, he purchased an Avro Avian he named the Southern Cross Minor, to attempt an Australia-to-England flight. He later sold the aircraft to Captain W.N. "Bill" Lancaster who vanished on 11 April 1933 over the Sahara Desert; Lancaster's remains were not found until 1962. The wreck of the Southern Cross Minor is now in the Queensland Museum. In the early 1930s, Smith began developing the Southern Cross automobile as a side project.

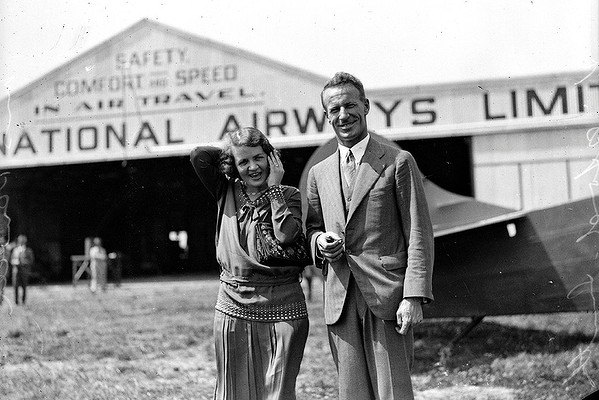
Kingsford Smith in 1933

In 1933, Seven Mile Beach, New South Wales, was used by Kingsford Smith as the runway for the first commercial flight between Australia and New Zealand.

In 1934, he purchased a Lockheed Altair, the Lady Southern Cross, with the intention of competing in the MacRobertson Air Race.

== Disappearance and death ==
Kingsford Smith and co-pilot John Thompson 'Tommy' Pethybridge were flying the Lady Southern Cross overnight from Allahabad (modern Prayagraj), India, to Singapore, as part of their attempt to break the England-Australia speed record held by C. W. A. Scott and Tom Campbell Black, when they disappeared over the Andaman Sea in the early hours of 8 November 1935. Aviator Jimmy Melrose claimed to have seen the Lady Southern Cross fighting a storm 150 miles (240 km) from shore and 200 feet (61 m) over the sea with fire coming from its exhaust. Despite a search for 74 hours over the Bay of Bengal by one person, British pilot Eric Stanley Greenwood, OBE, their bodies were never recovered.

Kingsford Smith was survived by his wife, Mary, Lady Kingsford Smith, and their three-year-old son Charles Jnr. Kingsford Smith's autobiography, My Flying Life, was published posthumously in 1937 and became a best-seller.

Eighteen months after the disappearance, Burmese fishermen found an undercarriage leg and wheel, with its tyre still inflated, which had been washed ashore at Aye Island in the Gulf of Martaban, 3 km (2 mi) off the southeast coastline of Burma, some 137 km (85 mi) south of Mottama (formerly known as Martaban). Lockheed confirmed the undercarriage leg to be from the Lady Southern Cross. Botanists who examined the weeds clinging to the undercarriage leg estimated that the aircraft lies not far from the island at a depth of approximately 15 fathoms (90 ft; 27 m). The undercarriage leg is now on public display at the Powerhouse Museum in Sydney, Australia.

In 2009, filmmaker and explorer Damien Lay stated he was certain he had found the Lady Southern Cross. The location of the claimed find was widely misreported as "in the Bay of Bengal". However, the 2009 search was in fact at the same location where the landing gear had been found in 1937, at Aye Island in the Andaman Sea.

Following The Joint Australian Myanmar Lady Southern Cross Search Expedition II (LSCSEII) in 2009, Lay conducted a total of ten further expeditions to Myanmar to recover wreckage from the site. In 2011, Lay claimed to have found the wreckage, but that claim has been widely disputed, and no evidence confirming the claim has been forthcoming. The location of the site, approximately 1.8 miles off the coast of Myanmar, has never been publicly released.

Lay has worked closely with both the Kingsford Smith and Pethybridge families since 2005. The privately funded project was supported by the government and people of Myanmar. In December 2017 Lay was still searching for parts of the Lady Southern Cross. In 2025, he published Of Air and Men, an account of the disappearance and his search.

== Honours and legacy ==
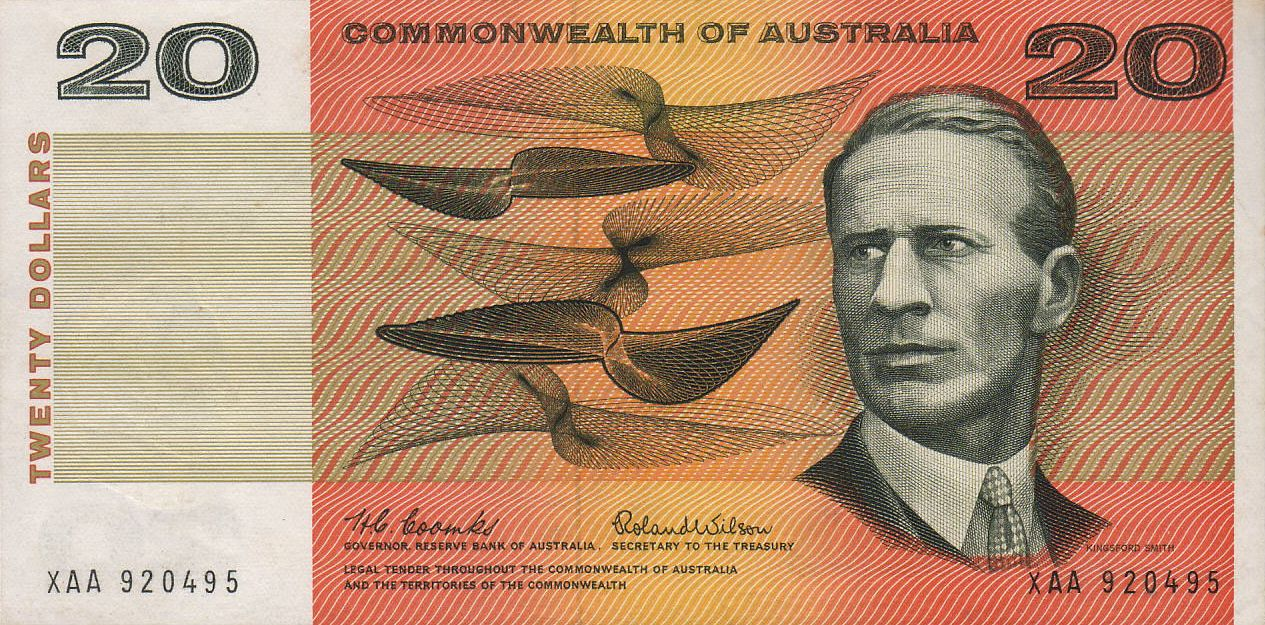
Kingsford Smith on the 20 Australian dollar banknote (1966–1994)

In 1929, Kingsford Smith was honoured by the Australian Aero Club Federal Council with the Oswald Watt Gold Medal (Australia's highest aviation award) for his record-breaking 12 day and 18 hour flight from Derby, Western Australia to Croydon, London. The following year, Kingsford Smith was again honoured with the Oswald Watt Gold Medal for his 1930 England to Australia and Trans-Atlantic flights.

In 1930, Kingsford Smith was the inaugural recipient of the Segrave Trophy, awarded for "Outstanding Skill, Courage and Initiative on Land, Water [or] in the Air".

Kingsford Smith was knighted in the 1932 King's Birthday Honours List as a Knight Bachelor. He received the accolade on 3 June 1932 from His Excellency Sir Isaac Isaacs, the Governor-General of Australia, for services to aviation and later was appointed honorary Air Commodore of the Royal Australian Air Force.

In 1986, Kingsford Smith was inducted into the International Air & Space Hall of Fame at the San Diego Air & Space Museum.

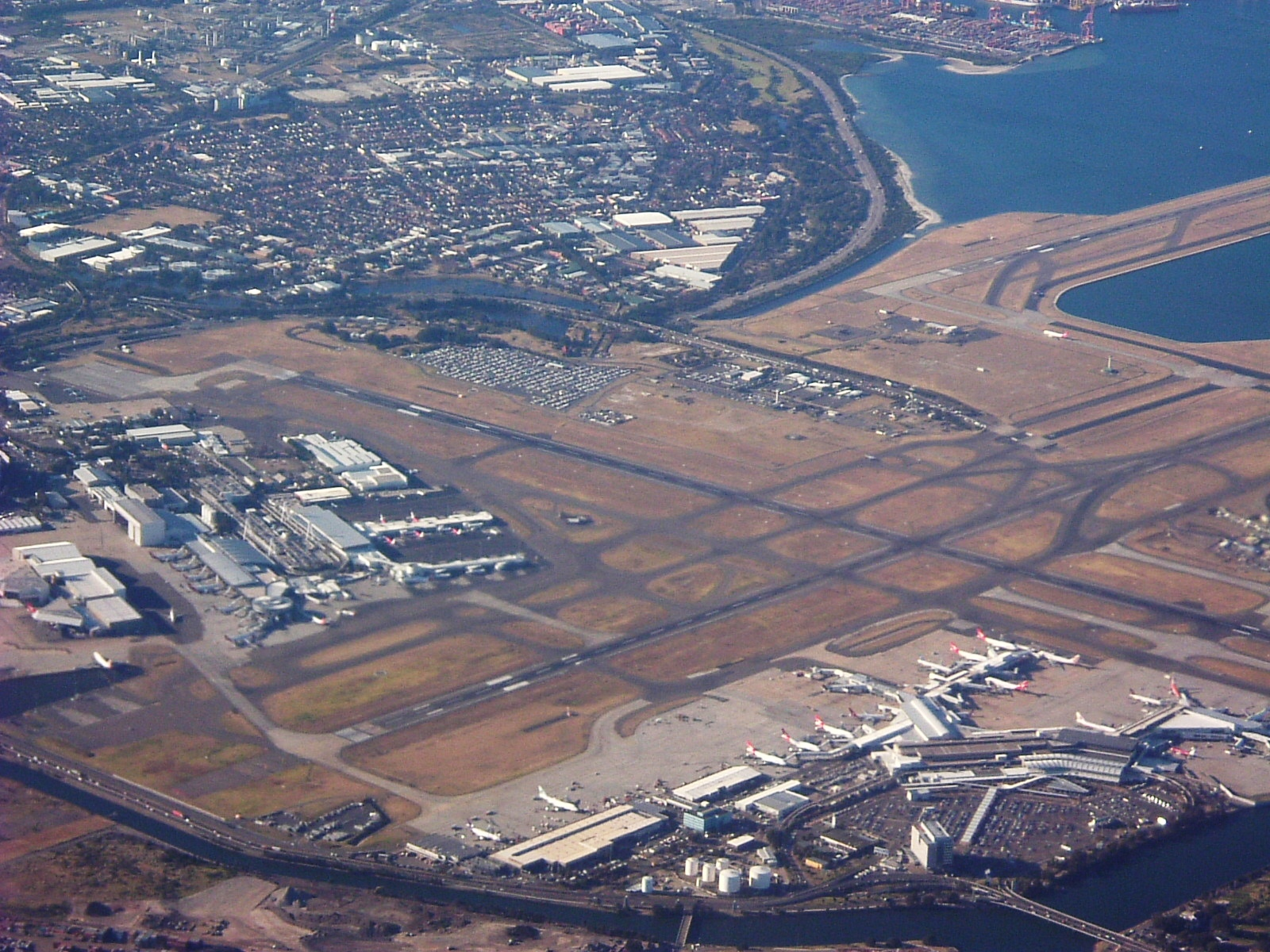
Kingsford Smith International Airport

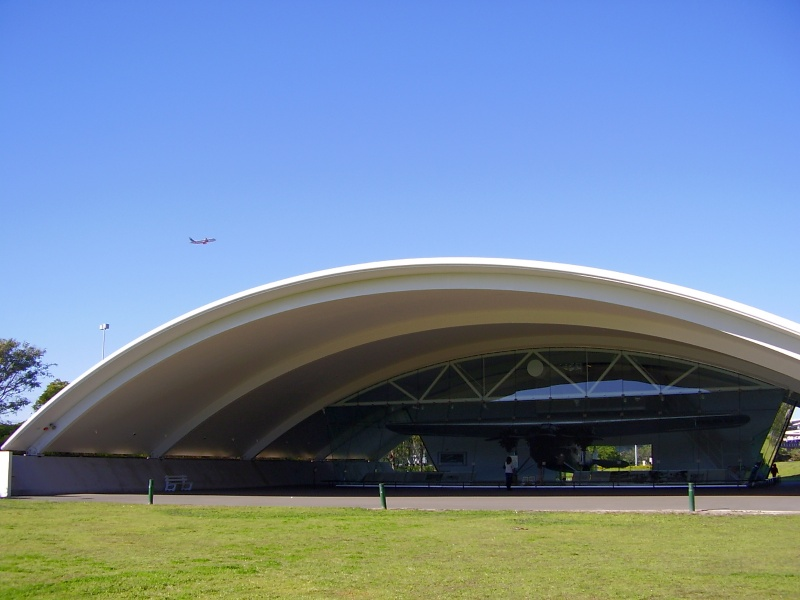
The Kingsford Smith Memorial, housing the Southern Cross, at Brisbane's International Airport

The major airport of Sydney, located in the suburb of Mascot, was named Kingsford Smith International Airport in his honour. The federal electorate surrounding the airport is named the Division of Kingsford Smith, and includes the suburb of Kingsford.

His most famous aircraft, the Southern Cross, is now preserved and displayed in a purpose-built memorial to Kingsford Smith near the International Terminal at Brisbane Airport. Kingsford Smith sold the plane to the Australian Government in 1935 for £3000 so it could be put on permanent display for the public. The plane was carefully stored for many years before the current memorial was built.

Kingsford Smith Drive in Brisbane passes through the suburb of his birth, Hamilton. Another Kingsford Smith Drive, which is located in the Canberra district of Belconnen, intersects with Southern Cross Drive.

Opened in 2009, Kingsford Smith School in the Canberra suburb of Holt was named after the famous aviator, as was Sir Charles Kingsford-Smith Elementary School in Vancouver, British Columbia, Canada.

He was pictured on the Australian $20 paper note (in circulation from 1966 until 1994, when the $20 polymer note was introduced to replace it), to honour his contribution to aviation and his accomplishments during his life. He was also depicted on the Australian one-dollar coin of 1997, the centenary of his birth.

Albert Park in Suva, where he landed on the trans-Pacific flight, now contains the Kingsford Smith Pavilion.

A memorial stands at Seven Mile Beach in New South Wales commemorating the first commercial flight to New Zealand.

Qantas named its sixth Airbus A380 (VH-OQF) after Kingsford Smith.

KLM named one of its Boeing 747s (PH-BUM) after Kingsford Smith.

A trans-Encke propeller moonlet, an inferred minor body, of Saturn is named after him.

Australian aviation enthusiast Austin Byrne was part of the large crowd at Sydney's Mascot Aerodrome in June 1928 to welcome the Southern Cross and its crew following their successful trans-Pacific flight. Witnessing this event inspired Byrne to make a scale model of the Southern Cross to give to Kingsford Smith. After the aviator's disappearance, Byrne continued to expand and enhance his tribute with paintings, photographs, documents, and artworks he created, designed or commissioned. Between 1930 and his death in 1993, Byrne devoted his life to creating and touring his Southern Cross Memorial.

== In popular culture ==
- Kingsford Smith made a cameo appearance as himself in the feature film Splendid Fellows (1934)
- A documentary was made about his life: The Old Bus (1934)
- The 1946 Australian film Smithy was based on his life, with Ron Randell as Kingsford Smith and John Tate as Ulm
- His life was dramatised in the 1966 radio play Boy on an Old Bus by Richard Lane.
- The 1985 Australian television mini-series A Thousand Skies, has John Walton as Kingsford Smith and Andrew Clarke as Ulm
- New Zealand author and documentarian Ian Mackersey's 1998 biography Smithy: The Life of Sir Charles Kingsford Smith (hardback ISBN 0 316 64308 4, paperback ISBN 0 7515 2656 8
- Bill Bryson details Kingsford Smith's life in his book Down Under.
- Australian author Peter FitzSimons's book Charles Kingsford Smith and Those Magnificent Men explores Smithy's life and aviation history (published by Harper Collins, Australia. 2009; (ISBN 978 0 7322 8819 8)
- The songs "Kingsford Smith, Aussie is Proud of You" and "Smithy" (1928) by Len Maurice
- The songs "Smithy" and "Heroes of the Air" (1928) by Fred Moore
- The songs "Smithy The King of the Air" and "The Southern Cross Monologue" by Clement Williams
- The song "Charles Kingsford Smith" by Don McGlashan is on his Lucky Star album
- Kingsford's disappearance was the topic of episode 22, series 1, of the TV series Vanishings! on Story Television titled "Disappearance of Charles Kingsford Smith" first aired 25 October 2003.
- In a comic book story produced in Australia, The Phantom finds the wreckage of the Lady Southern Cross in Burma. ("The Search for Byron", The Phantom #1131, published in 1996)

== See also ==
- History of Aviation
- List of firsts in aviation
- List of people who disappeared mysteriously at sea

== Notes ==
An aircraft similar to the Southern Cross, the Bird of Paradise, had made the first flight over (though not across) the Pacific, from California to Hawaii for the United States Army Air Corps, in 1927.

== Sources ==
- Blainey, Ann (2018), King of the Air: The Turbulent Life of Charles Kingsford Smith, Carlton, Vic: Black Inc. ISBN 978-1-7606-4107-8* Grant, James Ritchie. "Anti-Clockwise: Australia the Wrong Way". Air Enthusiast, No. 82, July–August 1999, pp. 60–63. ISSN 0143-5450
- Howard, Frederick (1983). "Kingsford Smith, Sir Charles Edward (1897–1935)". Australian Dictionary of Biography. National Centre of Biography, Australian National University. ISBN 978-0-522-84459-7. ISSN 1833-7538. OCLC 70677943.
- Kingsford-Smith, Eric (1928), "Captain Kingsford-Smith", The Dubbo Liberal and Macquarie Advocate, (Friday, 6 July 1928), p. 9.
- Serle, Percival (1949). "Smith, Charles Edward Kingsford". Dictionary of Australian Biography. Sydney: Angus & Robertson.
