= Cowra Guardian =

Newspaper in New South Wales, Australia

The Cowra Guardian, also published as The Guardian, The Cowra Gobbler, Cowra Guardian, Canowindra Star, The Canowindra Star and Eugowra News, Cowra Guardian and Lachlan Agricultural Recorder is a weekly newspaper published in Cowra, New South Wales, Australia, since 1885.

== History ==
The Cowra Guardian began as the Cowra Guardian and Lachlan Agricultural Recorder (1885–1943), a provincial newspaper and rural guide, published by S. A. Stevenson. It continued as the Cowra Guardian (1943–1980). It was renamed Cowra Gobbler from 1980 to 1984 before reverting to the Cowra Guardian. The Cowra Guardian absorbed a number of papers including the Lachlan Leader on 22 Oct 1943 and the Canowindra Star on 4 February 1972. The Canowindra Star was published from [1900] to 1971. It was named The Canowindra Star and Eugowra News from 1903 to 1925 before reverting to the Canowindra Star.

Provincial newspapers were an important outlet for the concerns of rural communities. In 1919 the proprietor of the Cowra Guardian, J. J. Sullivan articulated the needs of rural families at the annual conference of the NSWCPA.

The Cowra Guardian was acquired by Macquarie Publications in the 1980s.

== See also ==
- List of newspapers in Australia
- List of newspapers in New South Wales
