= Ian Mackersey =

New Zealand historian (1925–2015)

- Born: Ian Mackersey; 14 October 1925
- Died: 28 April 2015 (aged 89); Auckland

Ian Mackersey (14 October 1925 – 28 April 2015) was a New Zealand documentarian and author, who specialised in aviation history.

== Biography ==
Mackersey's professional career began in New Zealand where he worked as newspaper reporter. He then worked in London, UK, before spending time in Hong Kong, and Rhodesia, before returning to London. In 1983 Mackersey returned to New Zealand, settling in Auckland, and worked to produce television documentaries and to write biographies. He had published biographies on Tom Holt, Jean Batten, Sir Charles Kingsford Smith, and on the Wright brothers.

== Publications ==
=== Non-fiction ===
- — (1954). Rescue Below Zero. London, UK: Robert Hale.
- — (1956). Into the Silk: True Stories of the Caterpillar Club. London, UK: Robert Hale.
- — (1985). Tom Rolt and the Cressy Years. London, UK: M & M Baldwin. ISBN 0947712011.
- — (1991). Jean Batten: The Garbo of the Skies. London, UK: Macdonald. ISBN 0356195732.
- — (1998). Smithy: The Life of Sir Charles Kingsford Smith. London, UK: Warner Books. ISBN 0751526568.
- — (2003). The Wright Brothers: The Remarkable Story of the Aviation Pioneers Who Changed the World. London, UK: Time Warner Paperbacks. ISBN 0751533688.
- — (2012). No Empty Chairs: The Short and Heroic Lives of the Young Aviators Who Fought and Died in the First World War. London, UK: Weidenfeld & Nicolson. ISBN 9780297859949.

=== Fiction ===
- — (1955). Crusader Fox King. London, UK: Robert Hale.
- — (1974). Long Night's Journey. London, UK: Robert Hale. ISBN 070914346X.
