= Grenfell Record and Bland Advertiser =

Newspaper published in New South Wales, Australia

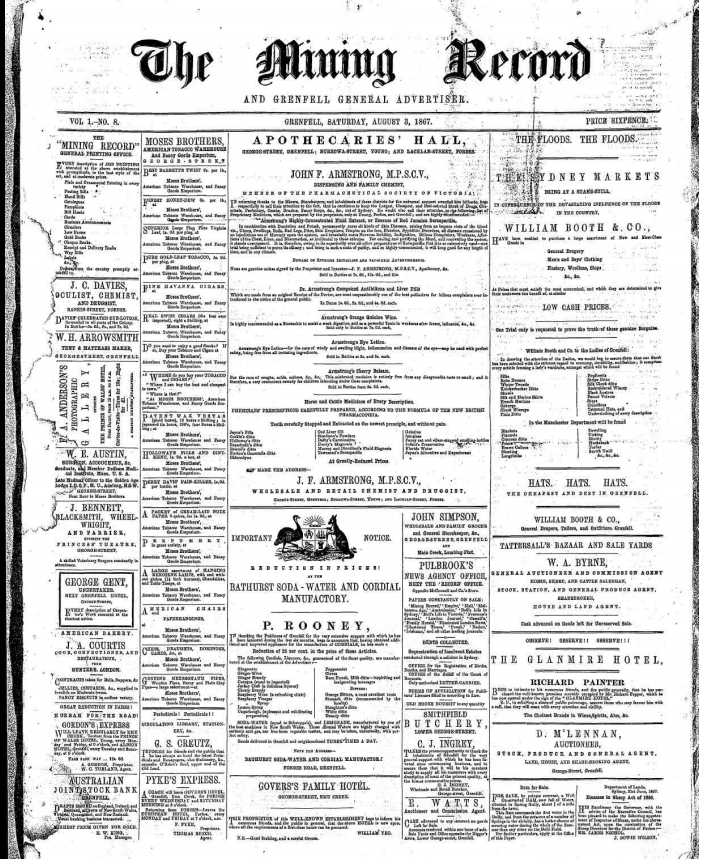
The front page of The Mining Record and Grenfell General Advertiser on 3 August 1867

The Grenfell Record and Bland Advertiser is an English language newspaper published in Grenfell, New South Wales, Australia. The newspaper has run continuously under various titles since June 1867 when it began as The Mining Record and Grenfell General Advertiser.

== History ==
The Mining Record and Grenfell General Advertiser was first published on 15 June 1867 by William Barnby Howarth, appearing every Saturday. The newspaper changed its name to The Grenfell Record and Lachlan District Advertiser on 27 April 1876. In June 1842 The Grenfell Record absorbed The Grenfell Observer, formerly The Vedette, and became The Grenfell Record and Bland Advertiser.

== Digitisation ==
Parts of the paper have been digitised as part of the Australian Newspapers Digitisation Program project of the National Library of Australia.

== See also ==
- List of newspapers in Australia
- List of newspapers in New South Wales
