= Southern Cross (automobile) =

Australian automobile (1931–1935)

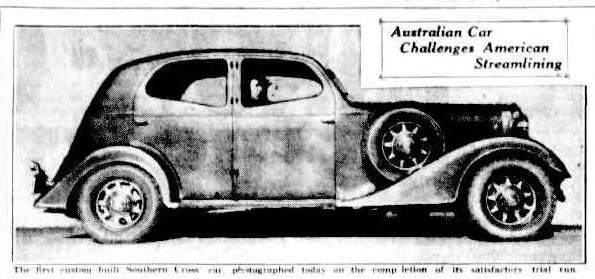
- Southern Cross sedan

Overview
- Manufacturer: Marks Motor Construction Company
- Production: 1931–1935

Powertrain
- Engine: 2340 cc flat-four

Dimensions
- Wheelbase: 120 in (3,048.0 mm)
- Kerb weight: 9 long cwt (457 kg; 1,008 lb)

Chronology
- Predecessor: Marks-Moir car

The Southern Cross was an Australian automobile produced between 1931 and 1935. Built by the Marks Motor Construction Company it was intended to retail for under 300 pounds. Volume production of the "Airline" Sedan was planned for 1935 but the marque died with the Chairman, Sir Charles Kingsford Smith.

Kingsford Smith was in the process of raising additional capital at the time of his disappearance over the Bay of Bengal.

The first experimental Southern Cross was an open tourer with a body constructed by the Beale Piano works. Several enclosed sedans were built for test and development purposes. The car featured a monocoque chassis and body along similar lines to the Marks-Moir car that had been in development since 1922. It was crafted from thin sheets of Queensland pine and walnut glued under pressure with aircraft casein glue. This "plywood" was moulded into shape during the curing process. Doors were precision cut from the body side and mounted back into place with metal hinges.

Assemblies such as engine, gearbox and suspension were mounted on steel frames bolted to the body. The engine, a locally produced flat-four of 2340 cc, eventually developed 60 bhp (45 kW) at 3200 rpm. It was designed by William Foulis who had designed and built the two cylinder motor of the 1917 "Roo" car.

The car weighed 19 long cwt (2,100 lb; 970 kg) and rode a 120 inches (300 cm) wheelbase. The combination of a small engine and light weight provided good performance and economy for the times.

Two of the cars built used an early form of automatic transmission developed in Australia. This was described as a frictionless system of centrifugal control in which the torque was developed by balanced weights brought into action by planetary gears without need of a clutch or gear lever.

Suspension was provided through very thin semi-elliptic leaf springs (18 for the front and 24 for the rear). Each alternate spring was interlocked. This system, combined with the flexibility afforded by chassis-less construction, enabled the vehicle to be built without shock absorbers.

The company put a proposal to the Federal Government to lease machinery and buildings at the Lithgow Small Arms Factory to build mechanical components on a large scale.

Production records are unclear but more than four and probably fewer than 10 Southern Cross cars were built.

The open Tourer, which was christened by Lady Kingsford Smith at Mascot Aerodrome in 1933, was sold to a resident of Parramatta, NSW, in 1936. It was probably destroyed in a fire during the 1970s. No Southern Cross cars survive.

== See also ==
- Marks-Moir car
