= Qantas =

Flag carrier airline of Australia

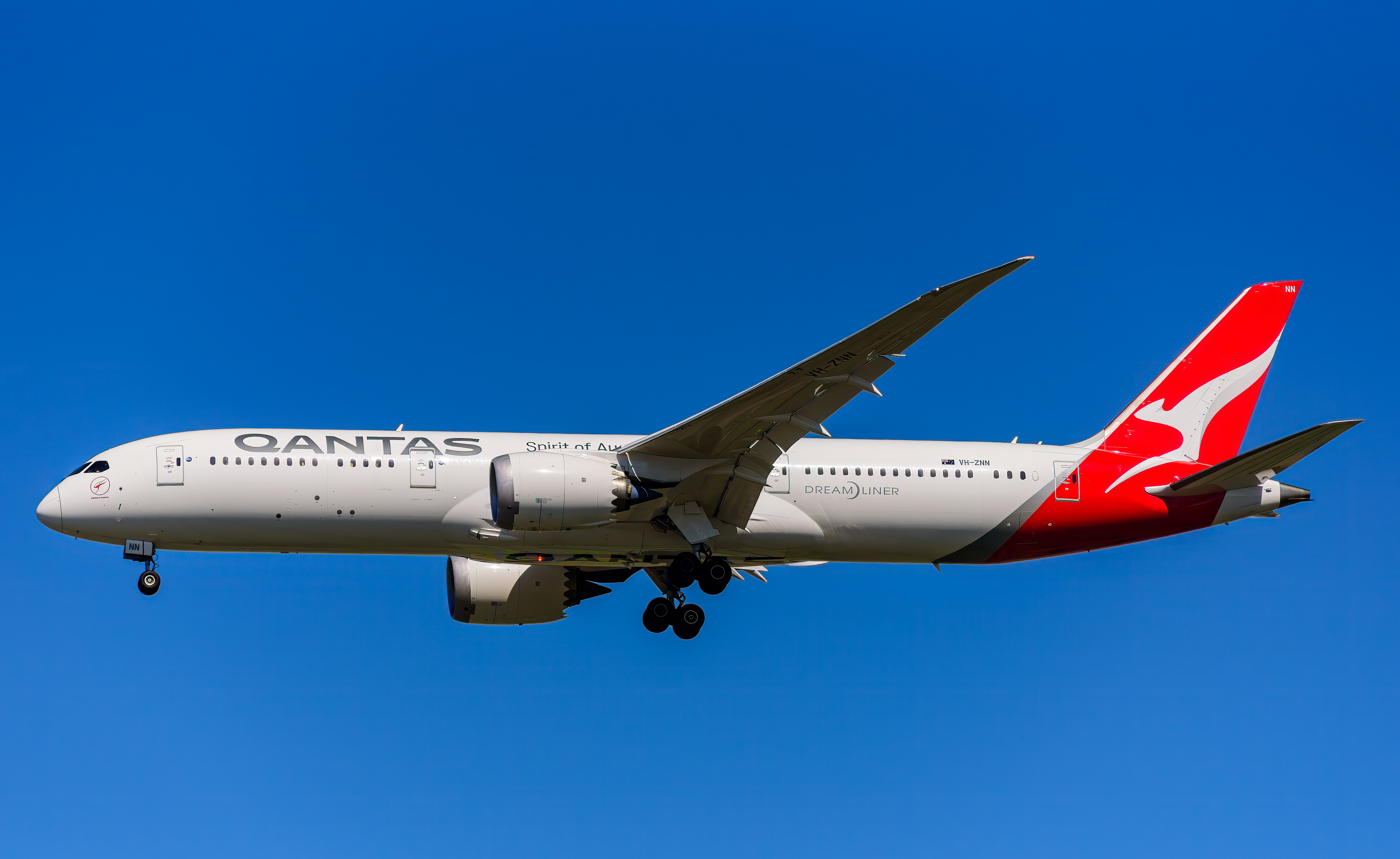
- Qantas Boeing 787-9
IATA	ICAO	Call sign
QF	QFA	QANTAS
- Founded: 16 November 1920; 106 years ago Winton, Queensland, Australia
- Commenced operations: 2 November 1922; 104 years ago
- AOC #: CASA.AOC.0001
- Hubs: Brisbane; Melbourne; Perth; Sydney
- Focus cities: Adelaide; Cairns; Canberra; Darwin; Hobart
- Frequent-flyer program: Qantas Frequent Flyer
- Alliance: Oneworld
- Subsidiaries: Jetstar; QantasLink; Qantas Freight; TripADeal; Qantas Loyalty: Qantas Frequent Flyer; Qantas Business Rewards; Qantas Hotels; Qantas Holidays; Qantas Shopping; Qantas Wine; Qantas Money; Qantas Insurance; Qantas Wellbeing
- Fleet size: 132
- Destinations: 104
- Parent company: Qantas Airways Limited
- Traded as: ASX: QAN; S&P/ASX 200 component; Majority Australian-owned under Australian Government legislation (Note: The Qantas Sale Act 1992 requires the majority of Qantas shares to be held by Australian investors)
- Headquarters: Mascot, New South Wales, Australia
- Key people: John Mullen (chairman); Vanessa Hudson (CEO)
- Founders: Hudson Fysh; Paul McGinness; Fergus McMaster
- Revenue: ▲ A$25.52 billion (FY25–26)
- Operating income: ▲ A$1.83 billion (FY25–26)
- Total assets: ▲ A$25.4 billion (FY25–26)
- Total equity: ▲ A$1.5 billion (FY25–26)
- Employees: ▲29,175 (2026)
- Website: qantas.com

Qantas Airways Limited (/ˈkwɒntəs/ KWON-təs), doing business as QANTAS or Qantas, is the flag carrier airline of Australia, and the largest airline by fleet size, international flights, and international destinations in Oceania. A founding member of the Oneworld airline alliance, it is the only airline in the world that flies to all seven continents, with it operating flights to Africa, Antarctica, (Note: Qantas operates dedicated 'flightseeing' services to Antarctica. These flights, using a Boeing 787 Dreamliner, depart Sydney, Melbourne, Brisbane, and Perth and provide a guided aerial tour of Antarctica before returning to Australia. These flights are about thirteen hours in total.) Asia, Europe, North America, and South America from its hubs in Sydney, Perth, Melbourne, and Brisbane. It also flies 60 to 65 domestic destinations across Australia.

Qantas is one of the world's oldest airlines still in operation, originally founded in November 1920. Qantas is an acronym of the airline's original name, Queensland And Northern Territory Aerial Services, as it originally served Queensland and the Northern Territory. Since then, the airline has undergone several changes, including nationalisation in 1947 and privatisation as a new company in 1967. It is popularly nicknamed "The Flying Kangaroo" and has the official slogan "Spirit of Australia".

Qantas is based in the Sydney suburb of Mascot, adjacent to its main hub at Sydney Airport. As of March 2023, Qantas Group had a 60.8% share of the Australian domestic market. Various subsidiary airlines operate to regional centres and on some trunk routes within Australia, as well as some short haul international flights under the QantasLink banner. Qantas owns Jetstar, a low-cost airline that operates both international services from Australia and domestic services within Australia and New Zealand. It holds stakes in a number of other Jetstar-branded airlines in Asia, as well as Alliance Airlines and Fiji Airways.

== History ==
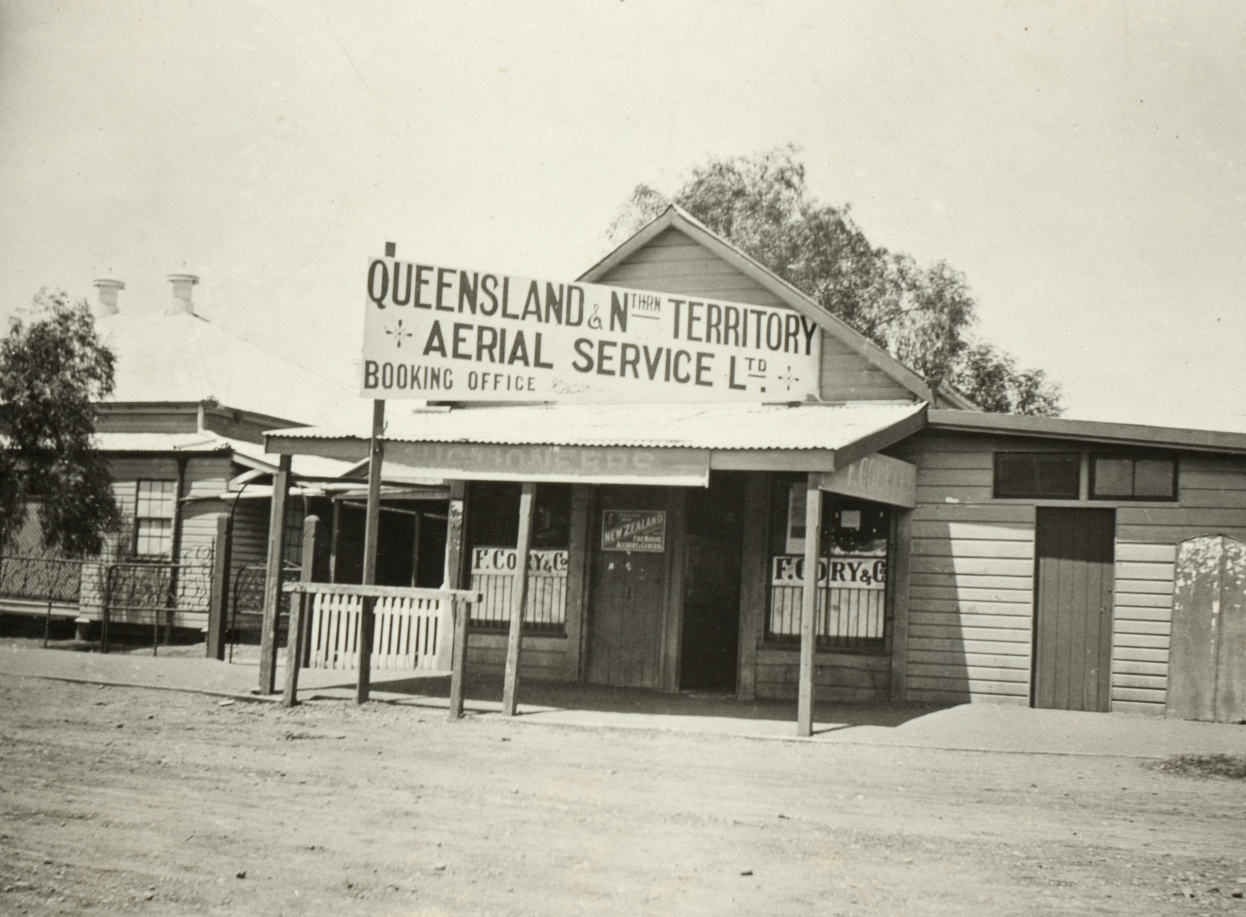
The original QANTAS office in Longreach, Queensland, 1921

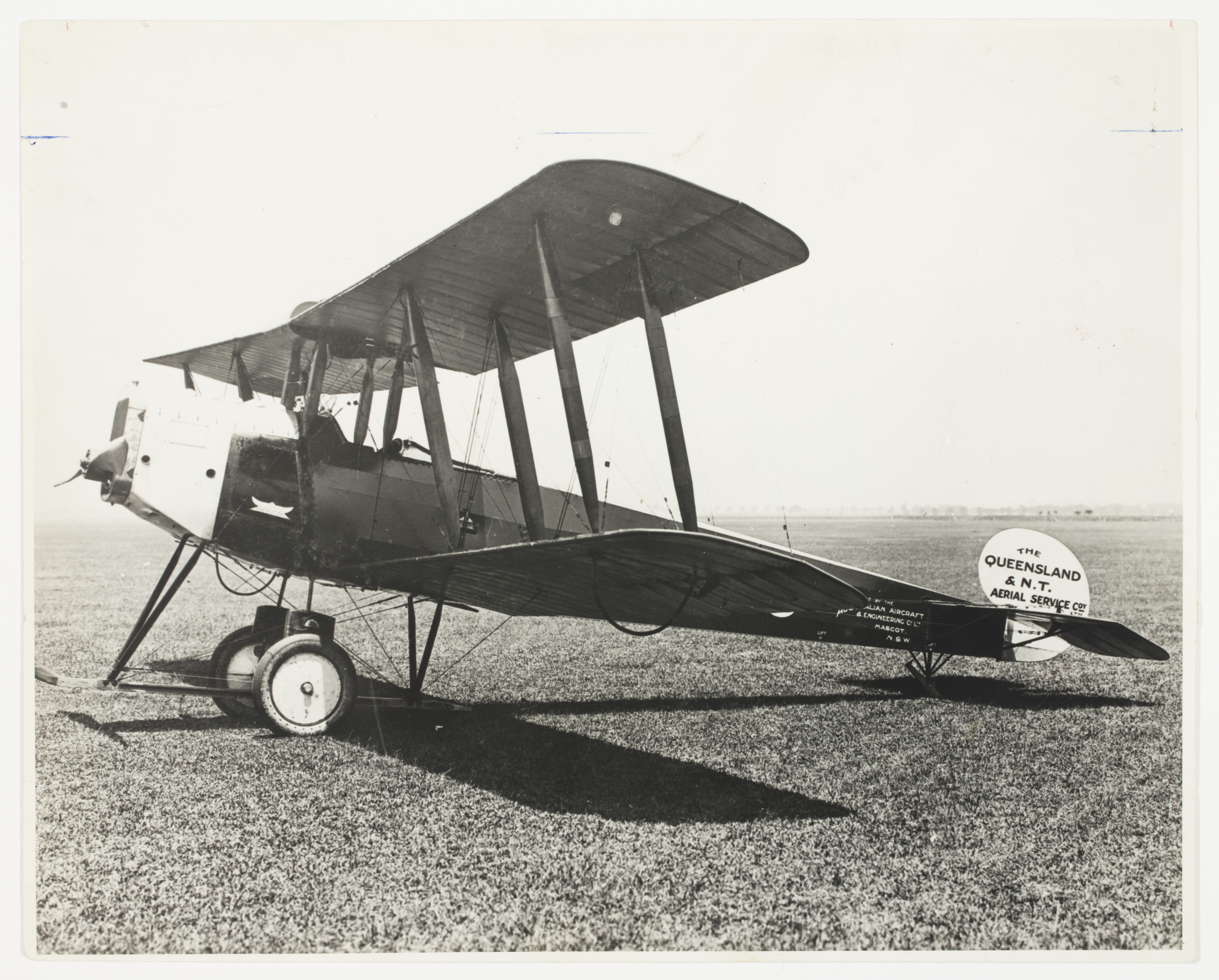
QANTAS Avro 504K Dyak, 1921

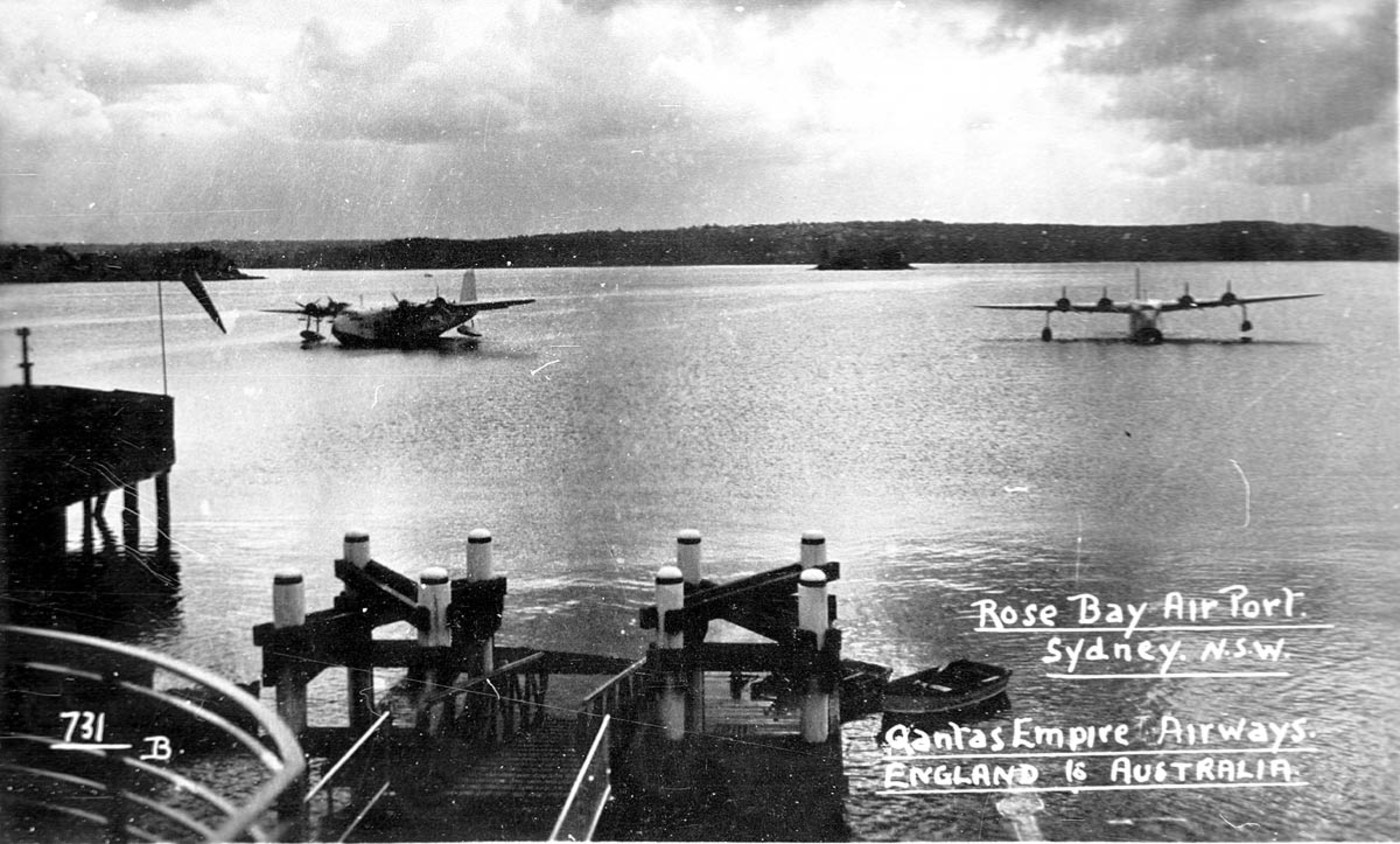
Qantas Empire Airways Short Empire flying boats at Rose Bay in Sydney Harbour, 1939

=== Q.A.N.T.A.S. ===
Qantas was founded in Winton, Queensland on 16 November 1920 by Hudson Fysh, Paul McGinness and Fergus McMaster as Queensland and Northern Territory Aerial Services Limited (Q.A.N.T.A.S.), beginning its operations with the Avro 504K, the airline's first aircraft. Q.A.N.T.A.S. eventually moved its headquarters to Longreach, Queensland in 1921, then to Brisbane, Queensland in 1930.

=== QEA era ===
In 1934, QANTAS and Britain's Imperial Airways, a forerunner of British Airways, formed a new company, Qantas Empire Airways Limited (QEA). In December 1934, the new airline began operations, flying between Brisbane and Darwin. QEA flew internationally from May 1935, when the service from Darwin was extended to Singapore. Imperial Airways operated the rest of the service through to London. When World War II began, enemy action and accidents destroyed half of the fleet of ten. Most of the fleet was taken over by the Australian Government for war service.

In 1943, flying boat services resumed, with flights between the Swan River at Crawley in Perth, Western Australia and Koggala Lake in Ceylon, now Sri Lanka. This linked up with the British Overseas Airways Corporation, BOAC, the successor airline to Imperial Airways, service to London. Qantas' kangaroo logo was first used on the "Kangaroo Route", commencing in 1944, from Sydney to Karachi, where BOAC crews took over for the rest of the journey to the UK.

In 1947, QEA was nationalised by the Australian government led by Labor Prime Minister Ben Chifley. QANTAS Limited was then wound up. After nationalisation, Qantas' remaining domestic network, in Queensland, was transferred to the nationally owned Trans-Australia Airlines, leaving Qantas with a purely international network. Shortly after nationalisation, QEA began its first services outside the British Empire, to Tokyo. Services to Hong Kong began around the same time. In 1957, a head office, Qantas House, opened in Sydney.

=== Jet age ===
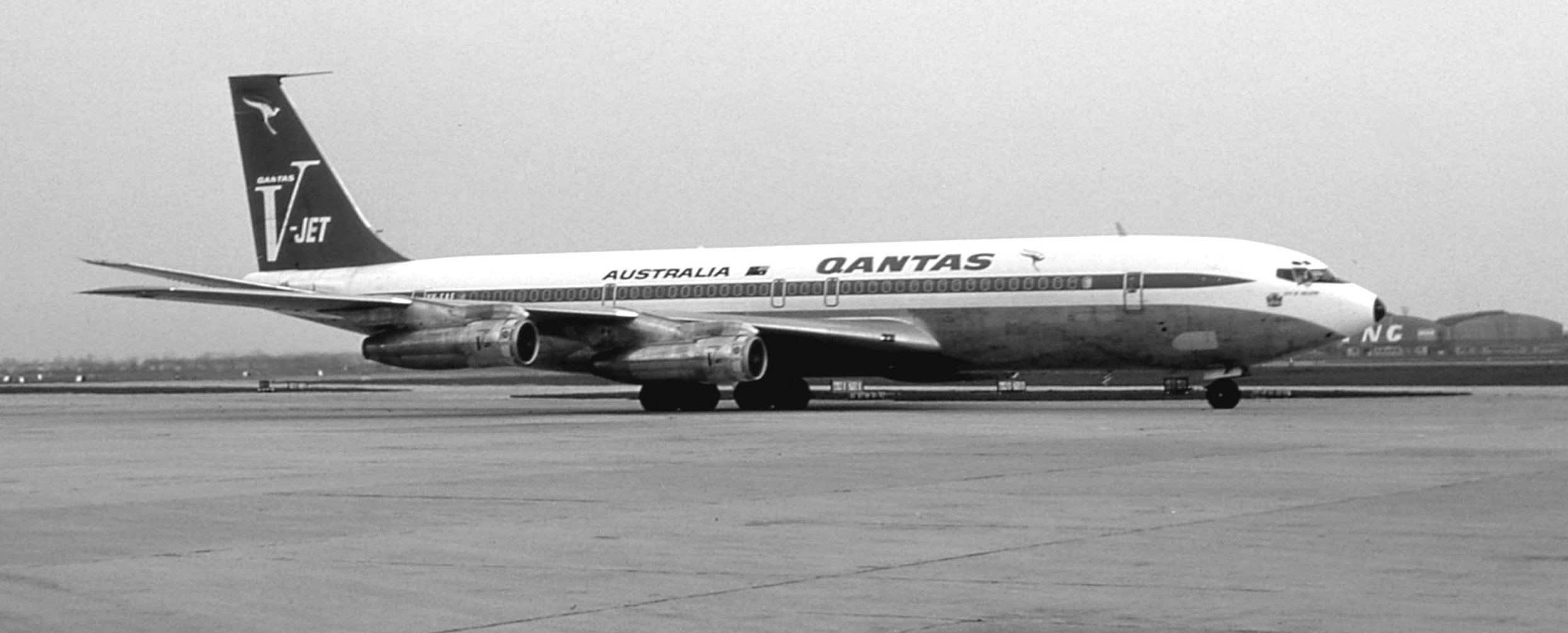
Qantas Boeing 707, Heathrow Airport, London, 1969

In June 1959, Qantas entered the jet age when the first Boeing 707-138 was delivered. The current parent company, Qantas Airways Limited, was incorporated in 1967. On 14 September 1992, Qantas merged with nationally owned domestic airline, Australian Airlines, renamed from Trans-Australia Airlines in 1986. Australian Airlines's aircraft started to be rebranded as Qantas aircraft in 1993. Qantas was gradually privatised between 1993 and 1997.

=== Oneworld and Jetstar ===
In 1998, Qantas co-founded the Oneworld alliance with American Airlines, British Airways, Canadian Airlines, and Cathay Pacific, with other airlines joining subsequently.

With the entry of new discount airline Virgin Blue (now Virgin Australia) into the domestic market in 2000, Qantas' market share fell. Qantas created the budget Jetstar in 2001 to compete. The main domestic competitor to Qantas, Ansett Australia, collapsed in September 2001.

Qantas briefly revived the Australian Airlines name as a short-lived international budget airline between 2002 and 2006. This subsidiary was shut down in favour of expanding Jetstar internationally, including to New Zealand. In 2004, the Qantas group expanded into the Asian budget airline market with Jetstar Asia, in which Qantas owns a minority stake. In 2007, a similar model was used for an investment into Jetstar Pacific, headquartered in Vietnam, and Jetstar Japan, launched in 2012.

In December 2006, Qantas was the subject of a failed bid from a consortium calling itself Airline Partners Australia. In 2008, merger talks with British Airways did not proceed to an agreement. In 2011, industrial relations dispute between Qantas and the Transport Workers Union of Australia resulted in the grounding of all Qantas aircraft and a lock-out of the airline's staff for two days.

On 25 March 2018, a Qantas Boeing 787 flew non-stop between Australia and Europe, connecting the two continents by air for the first time, with the arrival in London of Flight 9 (QF9). QF9 was a 17-hour, 14,498 km (9,009-mile) journey from Perth Airport in Western Australia to London Heathrow.

On 20 October 2019, Qantas Airways flew from New York City to Sydney using a Boeing 787-9 Dreamliner in 19 hours and 20 minutes, the longest commercial flight at the time.

=== COVID-19 ===
On 19 March 2020, Qantas suspended about 60% of domestic flights, put two thirds of its employees on leave, suspended all international flights, and grounded more than 150 of its aircraft from the end of March until at least 31 May 2020, following expanded COVID-19 pandemic government travel restrictions. To survive the pandemic, Qantas axed 6,000 jobs and announced a plan to raise A$1.9 billion in new capital. Qantas offloaded its 30% stake in Jetstar Pacific to Vietnam Airlines, retiring the Jetstar brand in Vietnam.

In July 2020, Qantas retired its last Boeing 747-438ER, after almost 49 years of continuous operation of the type—the first 747-238B was introduced in August 1971. All twelve Airbus A380s were placed in storage, ten at Mojave Air & Space Port and two at Los Angeles International Airport, for a minimum of three years. The pilots of the last Boeing 747 flight to Mojave Desert via Los Angeles traced the shape of the iconic Qantas logo in the flight path before the jet continued on its journey.

In November 2020, Qantas issued a public statement expressing their intention to require passengers traveling overseas to provide proof of COVID-19 inoculation. As per the statement made by Alan Joyce, the airline's CEO, the presence of a COVID-19 vaccine would be considered indispensable for the purpose of travel. Joyce expressed their intention to potentially modify the terms and conditions, to specify that anyone traveling internationally must have a vaccination before embarking. Qantas also announced the outsourcing of 2,000 ground staff roles to reduce costs. This decision was later found to have been illegal adverse action in order to prevent industrial action, and the airline was fined $90m in addition to agreeing to pay $120m compensation to affected staff.

In August 2021, Qantas required all of its 22,000 employees to be fully vaccinated against the virus.

In May 2022, Qantas ordered twelve A350-1000 aircraft from Airbus, to be used in non-stop flights from Sydney to London in late 2025. In the same month, Qantas agreed terms to purchase Alliance Airlines. In April 2023, the Australian Competition & Consumer Commission (ACCC) opposed the takeover.

By April 2024 Qantas had returned ten of its original twelve A380s to service, with all serviceable aircraft having undergone major refurbishment work to enhance the onboard soft furnishings.

=== Non-stop flight routes ===
In August 2022, Qantas Airways announced plans to compete in June 2023 with Air New Zealand on the non-stop Auckland–New York route. Qantas flights would originate in Sydney, before flying in 2026 on a non-stop Sydney–New York route, as part of Project Sunrise. Qantas aims to eliminate the "tyranny of distance" by developing non-stop flight routes connecting Australian cities to New York City, and to London. In February 2023, Qantas announced profits of A$1.7bn for the second half of 2022, after experiencing losses due to COVID. In a development described by ABC News as a "mammoth protest vote", on 3 November 2023 nearly 83% of Qantas shareholders voted against the airline's remuneration report.

== Destinations, routes and codeshare agreements ==
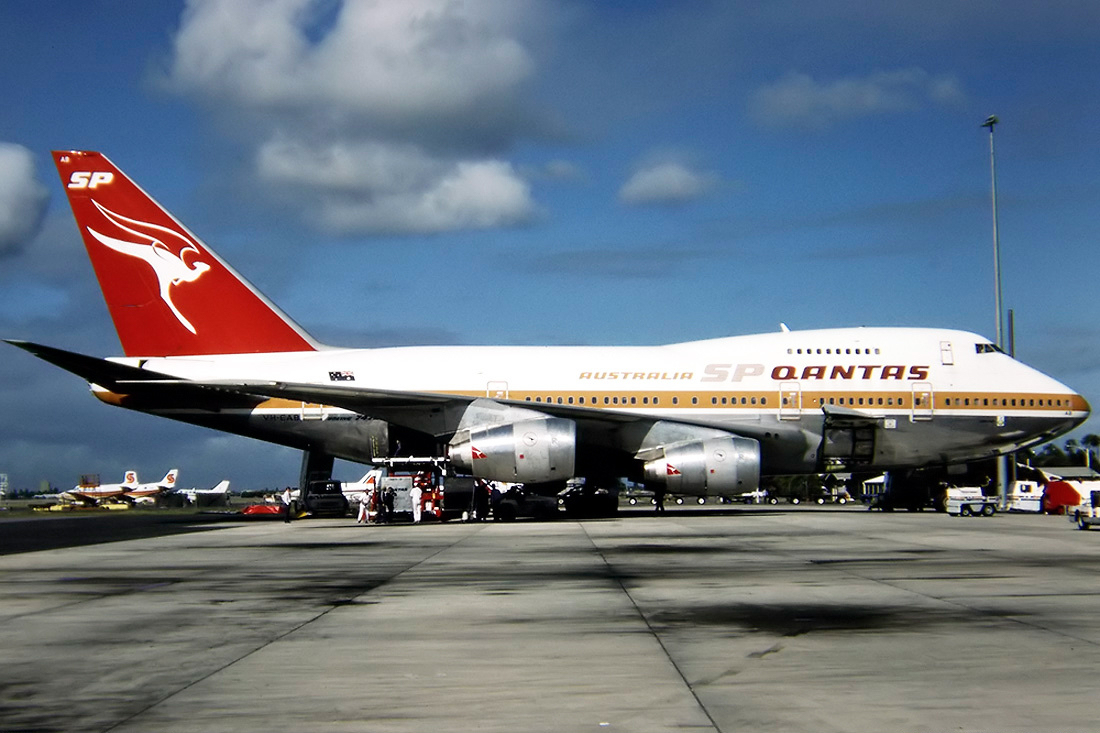
Qantas Boeing 747SP (VH–EAB) at Adelaide Airport, 1986

=== Destinations ===
Qantas operates regular services from Australia to destinations in Africa, Asia, Europe, North America and South America. Its domestic network serves all Australian states, along with the Australian Capital Territory, Northern Territory and the external territory of Norfolk Island. In addition, Qantas also operates 'flightseeing' charters to Antarctica from Sydney, Melbourne, Brisbane and Perth, and formerly from Adelaide, Canberra, and Hobart, in partnership with Melbourne-based company Antarctica Flights. It first flew these Antarctic flightseeing trips in 1977. They were suspended for a number of years due to the crash of Air New Zealand Flight 901 on Mount Erebus in 1979. Qantas restarted the flights in 1994. Although these flights do not touch down, they require specific polar operations and crew training due to factors like sector whiteout, which contributed to the 1979 Air New Zealand disaster.

=== Fifth-freedom routes ===
As of 2024, Qantas operated the following fifth-freedom flight services between the following cities:

- Auckland and New York–JFK (part of flights QF4 and QF3 from/to Sydney). This is the fifth-longest scheduled flight in the world.
- Singapore and London–Heathrow (part of flights QF2 and QF1 from/to Sydney)

=== 'International' domestic routes to and from Perth ===
Qantas uses Perth as a transit point for its European services between Sydney and Paris (QF33 and QF34), as well as for a seasonal service between Sydney and Rome (QF5 and QF6). These flights depart and arrive at the international terminal at Sydney Airport despite the Sydney–Perth segment of these flights being domestic. As Qantas is an Australian airline, it is permitted to carry, and sells tickets for domestic passengers intending to fly solely between Sydney and Perth. Qantas issues domestic passengers on these flights with an orange 'D' sticker that allows them to bypass customs and immigration, and passports are not necessary for these passengers.

=== Codeshare agreements ===
As of June 2025, Qantas had codeshare agreements with the following airlines:

- Air France
- Air New Zealand (ends 7 April 2027)
- Air Tahiti Nui
- Aircalin
- Airlink
- Airnorth
- Alaska Airlines
- American Airlines (Joint Venture Partner)
- Bangkok Airways
- British Airways
- Cathay Pacific
- China Airlines
- China Eastern Airlines
- China Southern Airlines
- El Al
- Emirates (Joint Venture Partner)
- Fiji Airways
- Finnair
- Hawaiian Airlines
- IndiGo
- Japan Airlines
- Jetstar
- Jetstar Japan
- KLM
- LATAM Chile
- Malaysia Airlines
- Oman Air
- Skytrans
- SriLankan Airlines
- WestJet

=== Interline agreements ===
Qantas has interline agreements with the following airlines:

- Starlux Airlines

== Fleet ==
=== Current fleet ===
As of November 2024, the Qantas Group and its subsidiaries operate 308 aircraft, including 85 aircraft by Jetstar Airways; 90 by the various QantasLink-branded airlines and eight by Express Freighters Australia (on behalf of Qantas Freight).

The group also has over 150 narrow-body and 36 wide-body aircraft firm orders as of August 2024, across the Airbus A220, Airbus A320neo, Airbus A321neo, Airbus A350 and Boeing 787 families to replace the existing fleet over the following decade, with these aircraft being distributed amongst Qantas, QantasLink and Jetstar.

== Cabin ==
=== International ===
==== First ====
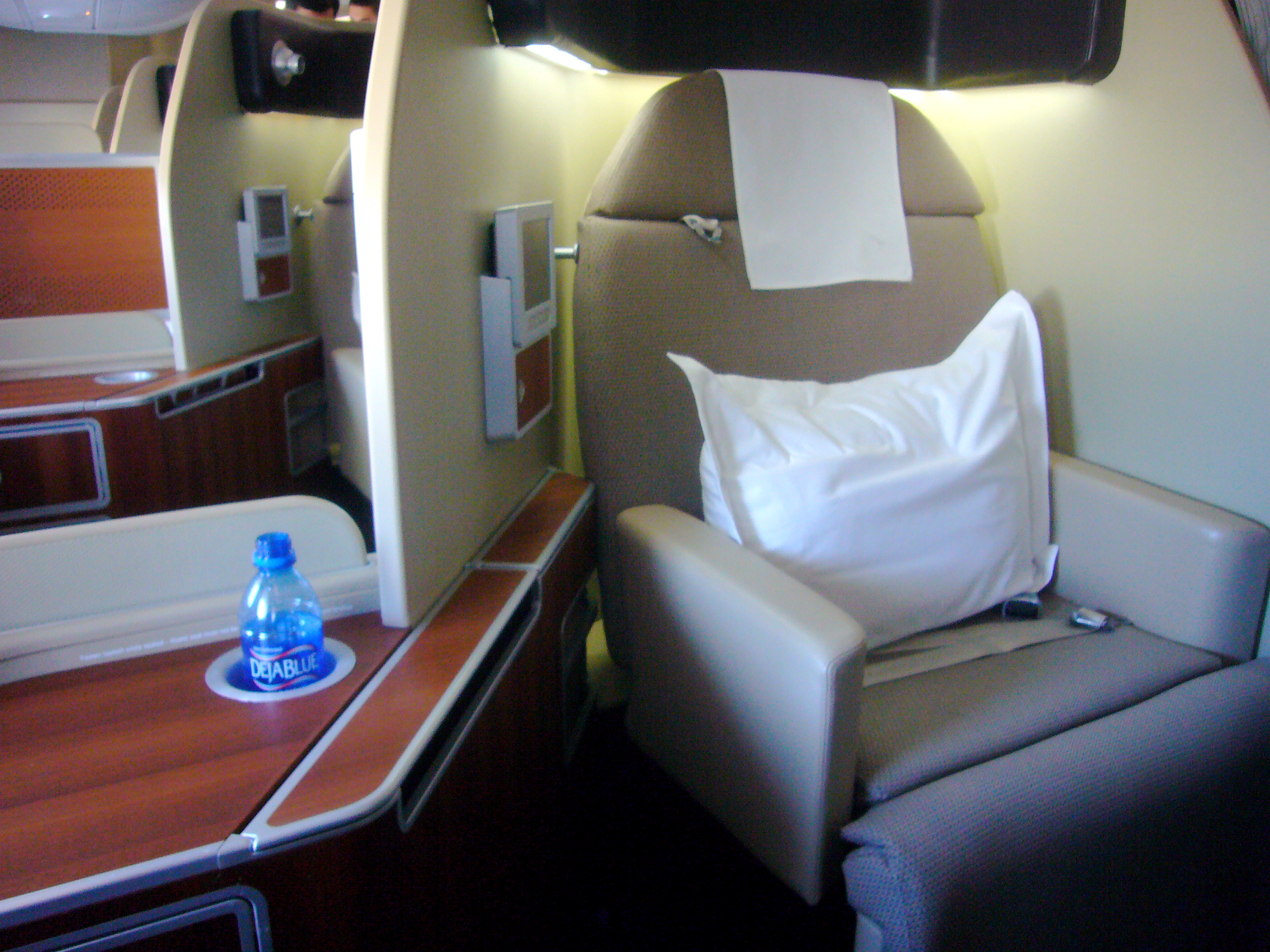
A Qantas first-class suite on the Airbus A380

First class is available on the Airbus A380 and future A350s.

It offers 14 individual suites in a 1–1–1 layout. The seats face forward for takeoff, but can rotate to the side for sleeping and dining with 83.5in seat pitch (extending to a 212 cm fully flat bed) and a width of 74 cm (29 in). Each suite contains a 43 cm (17 in) widescreen monitor. In addition to AC power outlets, USB ports are also offered. Passengers are also able to utilise the lounge on the upper deck. Complimentary access to both the first class and business class lounges (or affiliated lounges) is offered as well.

Updated versions of this seat were fitted to the airline's refurbished Airbus A380 aircraft from late 2019. The seat features refreshed cushioning and larger entertainment screens compared to the older version.

==== Business ====
===== Business Suites =====
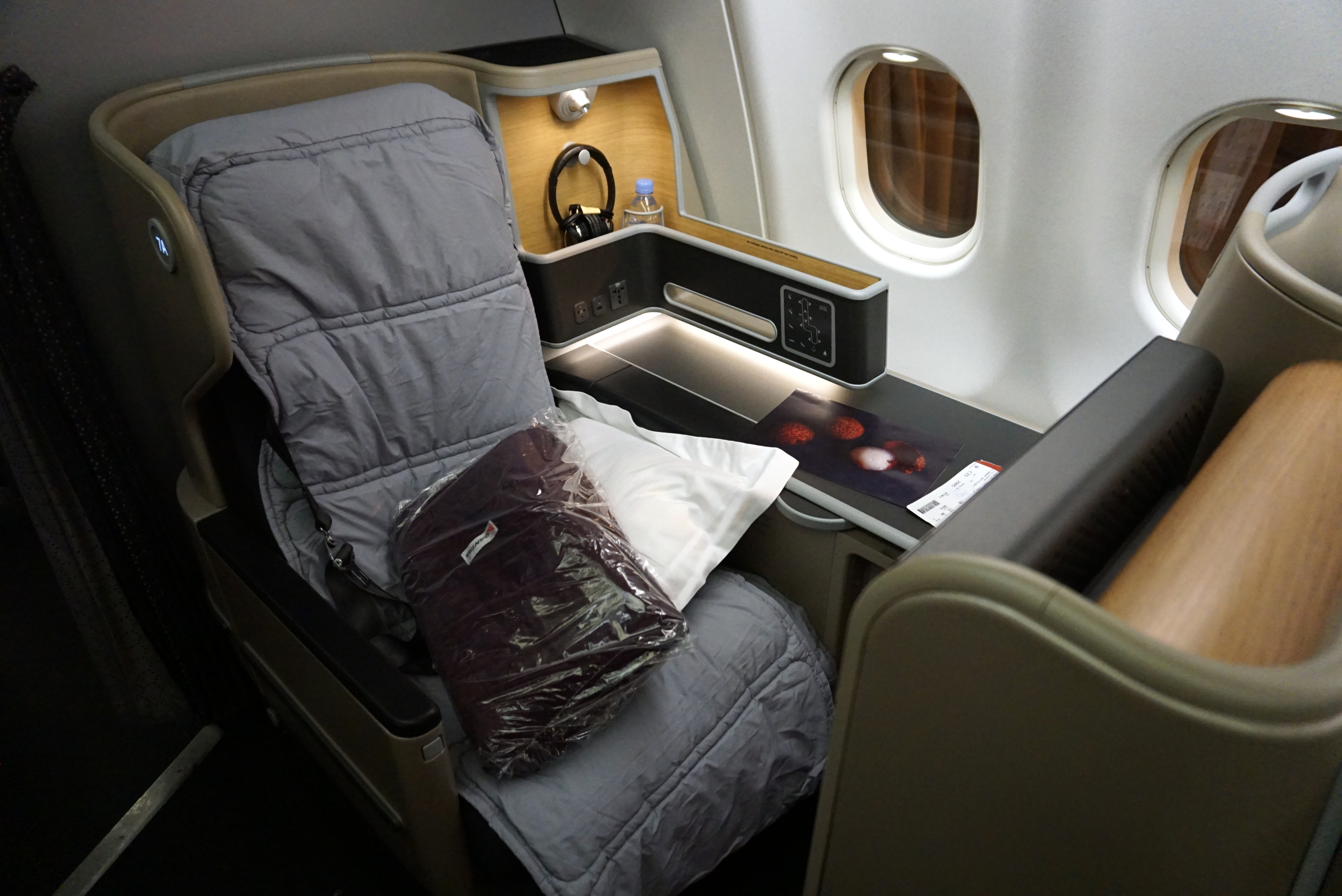
Qantas Business Suite on all Boeing 787, Airbus A330 and selected Airbus A380 aircraft

Business Suites are available on all Boeing 787, Airbus A330, and selected Airbus A380 aircraft.

These seats are lie-flat and are in a 1–2–1 configuration. The Business Suite was introduced on the A330 in October 2014, and includes a Panasonic touchscreen eX3 system. By the end of 2016, the business class seats of Qantas' entire Airbus A330 fleet were refitted. Airbus A330 Business Suites are available on Asian routes, transcontinental routes across Australia and selected routes to New Zealand.

Updated versions of this seat were fitted to the airline's new Boeing 787 fleet from late 2017.

==== Premium Economy ====
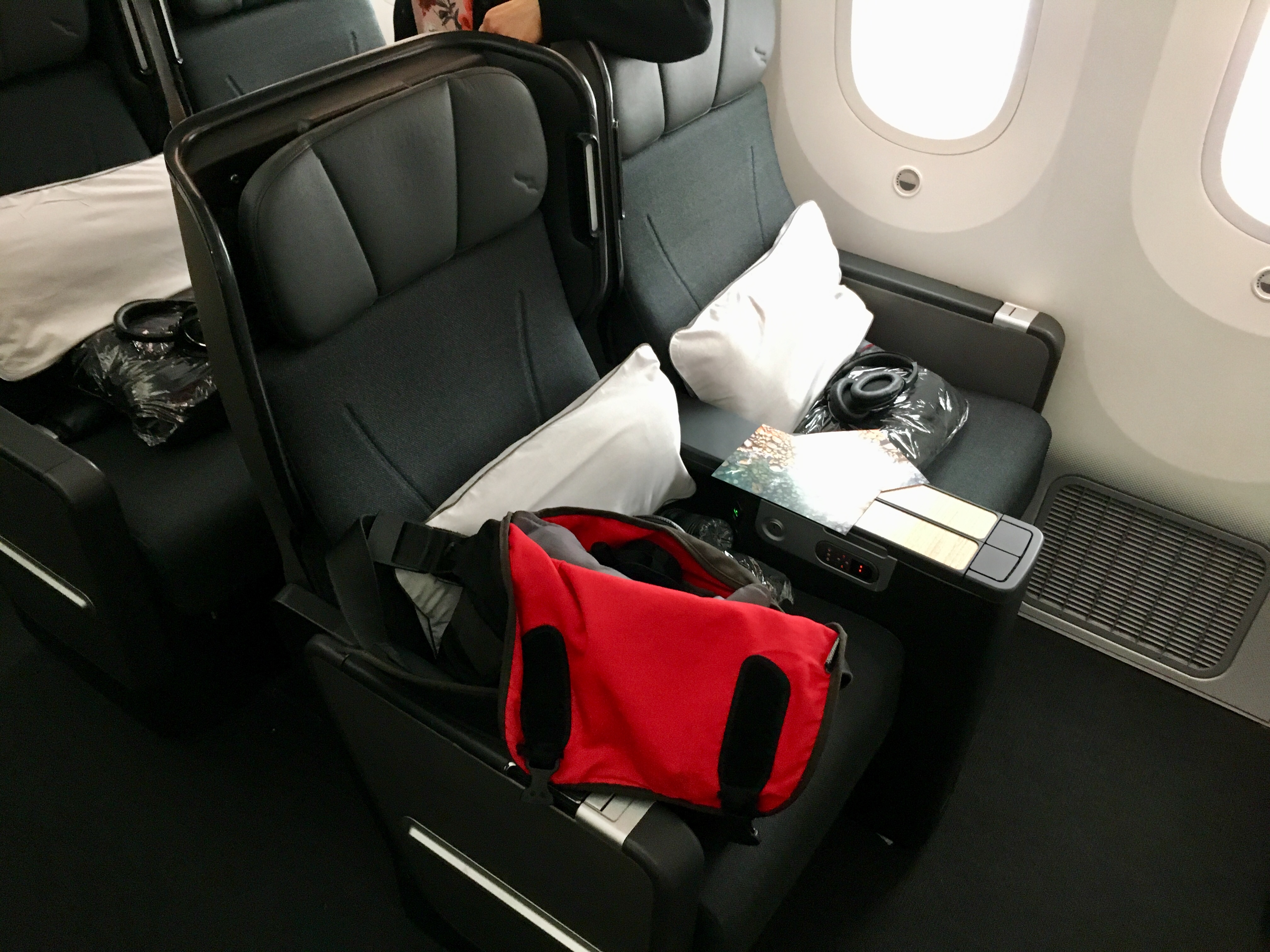
A Qantas Premium Economy seat on the Boeing 787

Premium economy class is offered on all Airbus A380 and Boeing 787-9 aircraft.

On the Airbus A380, the seat pitch ranges from 97 to 107 cm (38 to 42 in), with a width of 50 cm (19 1/2 in). On the Boeing 787, it is configured in a 2–3–2 seating arrangement, whereas it is in a 2–3–2 seating arrangement at the rear of the upper deck on the A380. The total number of seats depends on the aircraft type, as A380s have 35–60 seats, (depending on the configuration) and 787s have 28 seats.

In 2019, Qantas began retrofitting its Airbus A380 aircraft with new Premium Economy seats, as offered on Boeing 787 aircraft. The new cabin will gain 25 premium economy seats compared to the previous configuration.

==== Economy ====
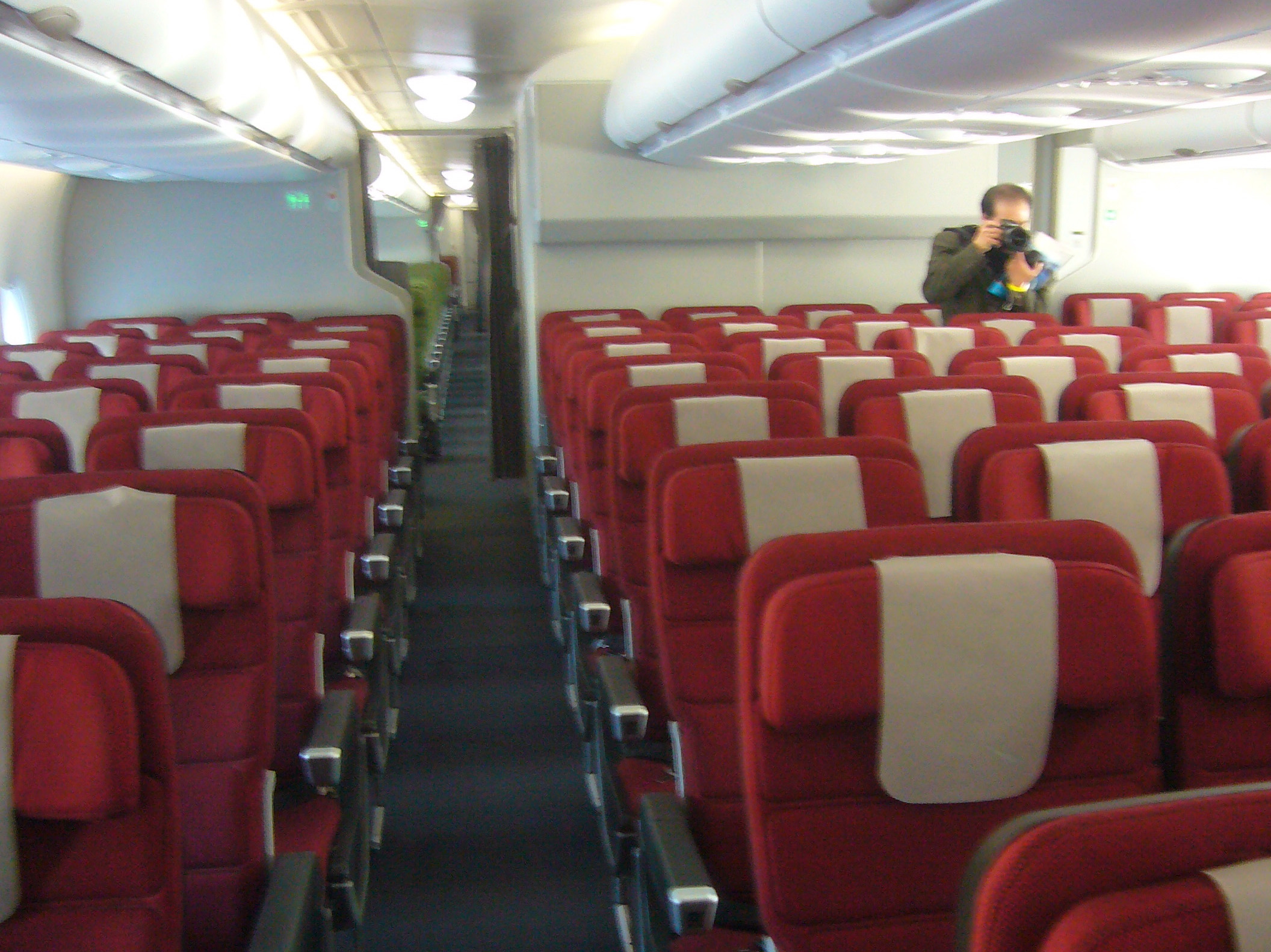
Qantas international economy cabin on the Airbus A380

International Economy class is available on all Qantas mainline passenger aircraft.

Seat pitch is usually 79 cm (31 in) and seat width ranges from 43 to 44 cm (17 to 17 1/2 in). Layouts are 3–3 on the 737, 2–4–2 on the A330, and 3–3–3 on the B787-9. On the A380, the layout is 3–4–3 and there are four self-service snack bars located in between cabins.

In 2019, Qantas began retrofitting its Airbus A380 aircraft with new Economy seats containing new seat cushions and improved inflight entertainment, as offered on Airbus A330 and Boeing 787 aircraft. The new aircraft will have fewer economy seats compared to the previous configuration due to an increase in the number of premium seats.

=== In-flight entertainment ===
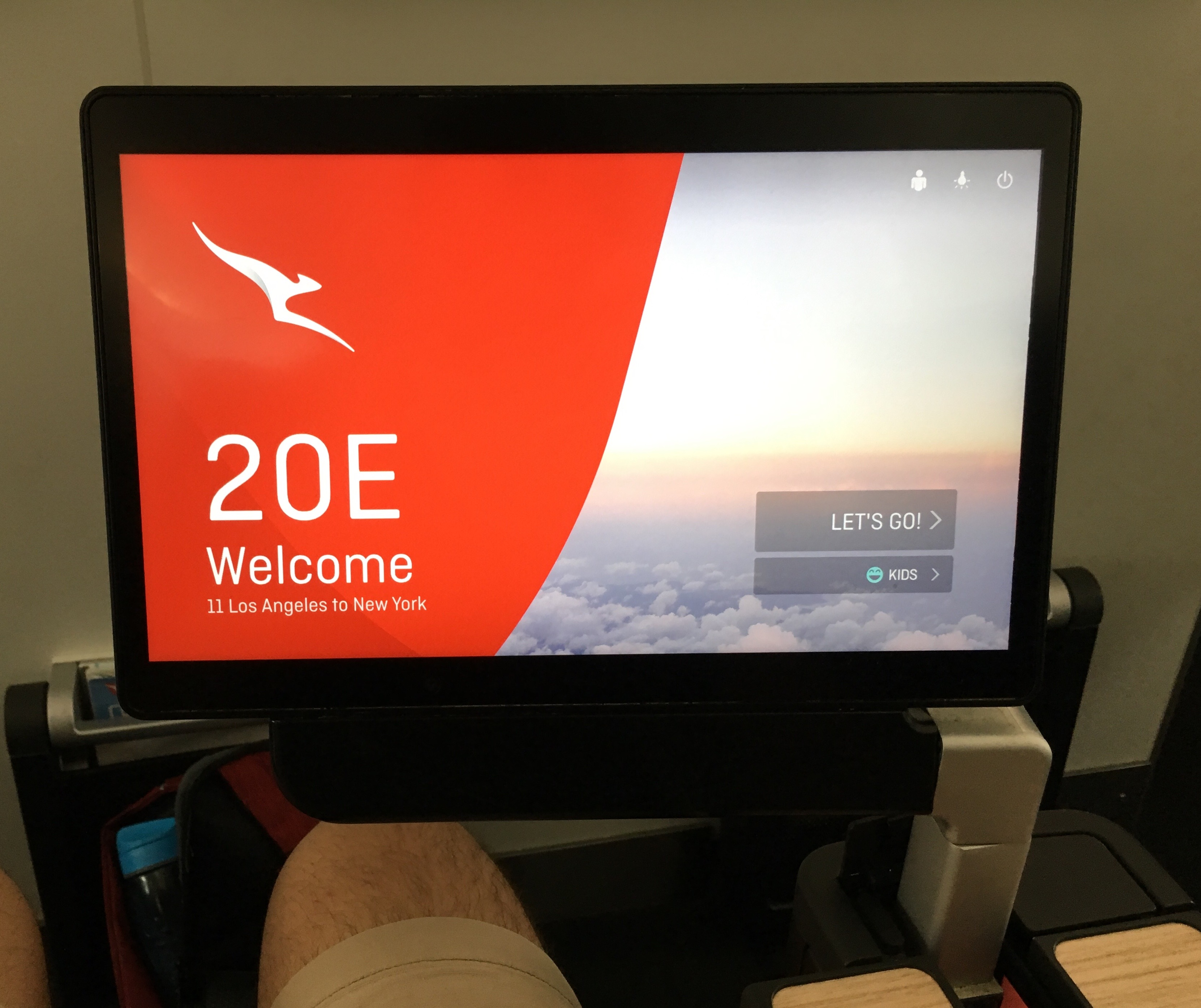
Qantas' current in-flight entertainment (IFE) system in Premium Economy

All Qantas mainline aircraft contain some form of video and audio entertainment. Qantas has several types of in-flight entertainment (IFE) systems installed on its aircraft.

==== Audio-video entertainment systems ====
The "Total Entertainment System" by Rockwell Collins was available on selected domestic and international aircraft between 2000 and 2019. This AVOD system included personal LCD screens in all classes, located in the seat back for economy and business class, and in the armrest for premium economy and first class.

The Mainscreen System is available on selected Boeing 737-800 aircraft. This entertainment system, introduced gradually between 2002 and 2011, has overhead video screens as the main form of entertainment. Movies are shown on the screens on longer flights and TV programmes on shorter flights. A news telecast will usually be shown at the start of each flight. Audio options are less varied than on Q, iQ or the Total Entertainment System.

The "iQ" inflight entertainment system by Panasonic Avionics Corporation is available on selected Airbus A380 and Boeing 737-800 aircraft. This AVOD experience, introduced in 2008, is based on the Panasonic Avionics system and features expanded entertainment options, touch screens and new communications-related features such as Wi-Fi and mobile phone functionality, as well as increased support for electronics (such as USB and iPod connectivity).

The "Q" inflight entertainment system by Panasonic Avionics Corporation is available on all Airbus A330-300, A330-200, Boeing 787 and selected Airbus A380 aircraft. This audio video on demand (AVOD) experience, introduced in 2014 and updated in 2018 on selected aircraft, is based on the Panasonic eX3 system and features extensive entertainment options; enhanced touch screens; and communications-related features such as Wi-Fi and mobile phone functionality; as well as increased support for electronics (such as USB and iPod connectivity). The "my flight" feature offers access to maps, playlists, and a service timeline showing when drinks and meals will be served and the best time for resting on long-haul flights.

In 2024, Qantas selected Panasonic's OLED 4K 'Astrova' seatback screen to be equipped on its Airbus A350 fleet to be delivered from 2026. The entertainment system will feature "high-fidelity multi-channel spatial audio technology" and Bluetooth connectivity allowing for passengers to connect their personal wireless earbuds or headphones. The Astrova IFE system will also deliver 100 W of mobile device and laptop fast-charging via USB-C, available through all phases of flight.

==== Wireless entertainment systems and Wi-Fi ====
Q Streaming is an in-flight entertainment system in which entertainment is streamed to iPads or personal devices available in all classes on selected aircraft. A selection of movies, TV, music, and a kids' choice are available.

In 2007, Qantas conducted a trial for use of mobile telephones with AeroMobile, during domestic services for three months on a Boeing 767. During the trial, passengers were allowed to send and receive text messages and emails but were not able to make or receive calls.

In July 2015, Qantas signed a deal with American cable network HBO to provide over 120 hours of television programming in-flight from the network on its aircraft, as well as original lifestyle and entertainment programming from both Foxtel and the National Geographic Channel. In August 2022, it was announced that the airline had partnered with Network 10 owner Paramount to launch the Paramount+ service on its in-flight entertainment systems.

In 2017, Qantas began offering complimentary Wi-Fi on its domestic aircraft. The services utilises NBN Co Sky Muster satellites to deliver higher speeds than generally offered by onboard Wi-Fi. Previously, in July 2007, Qantas announced that Wi-Fi would be available on its long haul A380s and 747-400s although that system ultimately did not proceed following trials.

In 2023, Qantas began offering complimentary Wi-Fi on select international flights. Qantas aims to have complimentary Wi-Fi on all of its international aircraft by 2026. The Wi-Fi will be available to all customers free of charge, regardless of class, ticket or frequent flyer tier, as is the case with the airline's domestic Wi-Fi.

==== News media ====
Until 2014, the Australian Nine Network provided a news bulletin for Qantas entitled Nine's Qantas Inflight News, which was the same broadcast as Nine's Early Morning News, however Nine lost the contract to Sky News Australia in 2014. In 2022, Qantas ended its contract with Sky News and signed an agreement with the Australian Broadcasting Corporation's ABC News to provide inflight digital news services for Qantas passengers.

==== Inflight magazine ====
Qantas: The Australian Way is the airline's in-flight magazine. In mid-2015, the magazine ended a 14-year publishing deal with Bauer Media, switching its publisher to Medium Rare.

== Services ==
=== Qantas Frequent Flyer ===

The Qantas frequent-flyer program is aimed at rewarding customer loyalty. It is Australia's largest loyalty program, with 16.4 million members as of June 2024. The program is long-standing, although the date of the actual inception has been a matter that has generated some commentary. Qantas state the program launched in 1987 although other sources claim what is the current program was launched in the early 1990s, with a Captain's Club program existing before that.

=== Lounges ===
==== International First Lounge ====
Qantas operates international First Lounges in Auckland, Melbourne, Singapore, Sydney and Los Angeles. A London First Lounge is currently under construction and will open in 2025. Compared to international Business lounges the First Lounges generally offer superior food and beverage. Access is available to First Class, Qantas Platinum, Platinum One, and Oneworld Emerald frequent flyers travelling on a Qantas, Jetstar or Oneworld flight. Qantas Chairmans Lounge Members are permitted access when travelling on any airline.

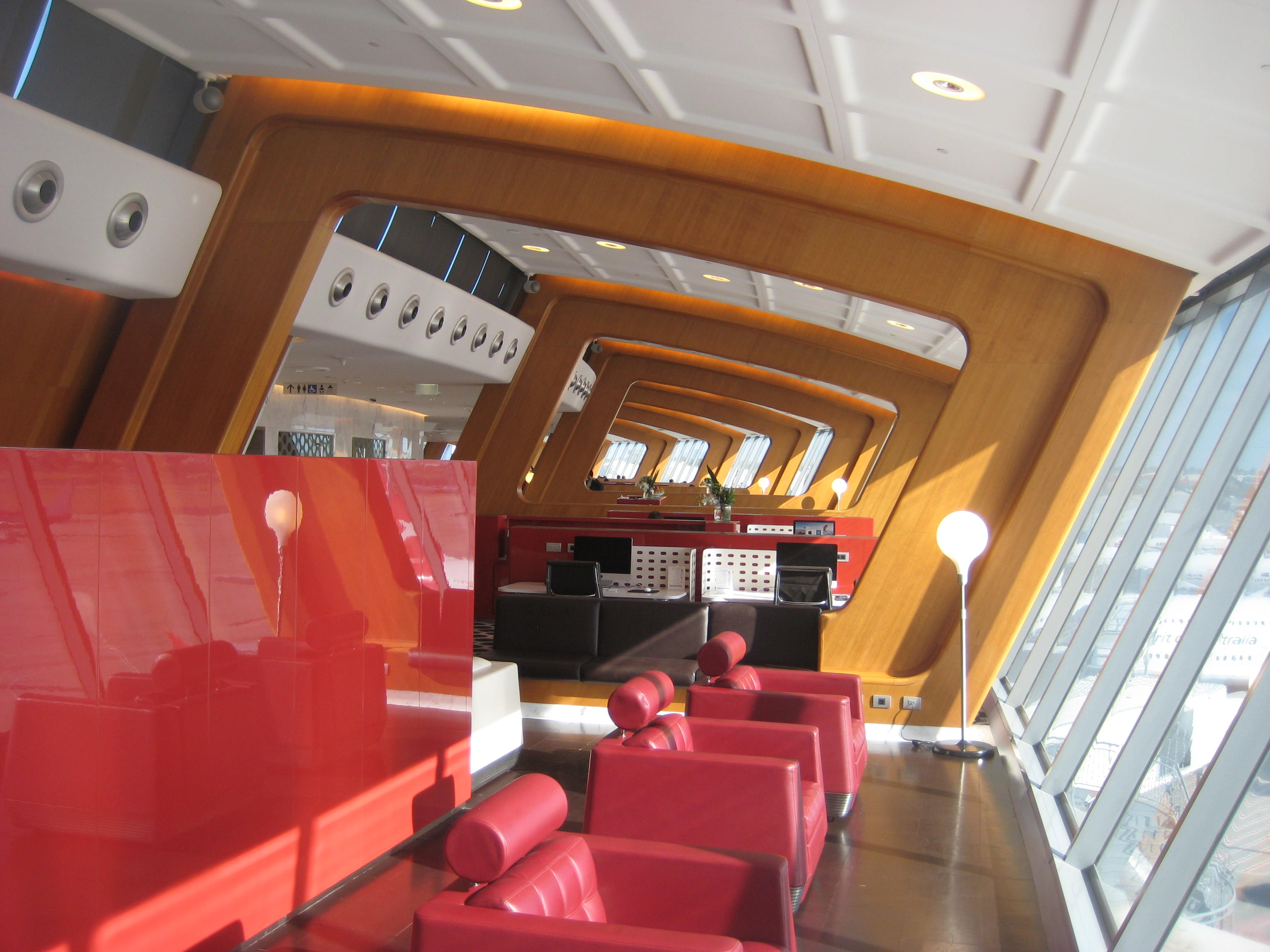
The Qantas First Lounge at Sydney Airport

==== International Business Lounge ====
Qantas operates international Business Lounges in Auckland, Brisbane, Hong Kong, Honolulu, London, Los Angeles, Melbourne, Perth, Singapore, Sydney and Wellington. Access is available to international Business Class, First Class, Qantas Club Members, Qantas Gold, Platinum, Platinum One, OneWorld Sapphire and Emerald frequent flyers when travelling on a Qantas, Jetstar or Oneworld flight. These International lounges replaced the formerly separate first and business class lounges in these locations. These new lounges provide similar service to what is currently offered by Sofitel in the flagship First lounges in Sydney and Melbourne and a dining experience featuring Neil Perry's Spice Temple inspired dishes and signature cocktails.

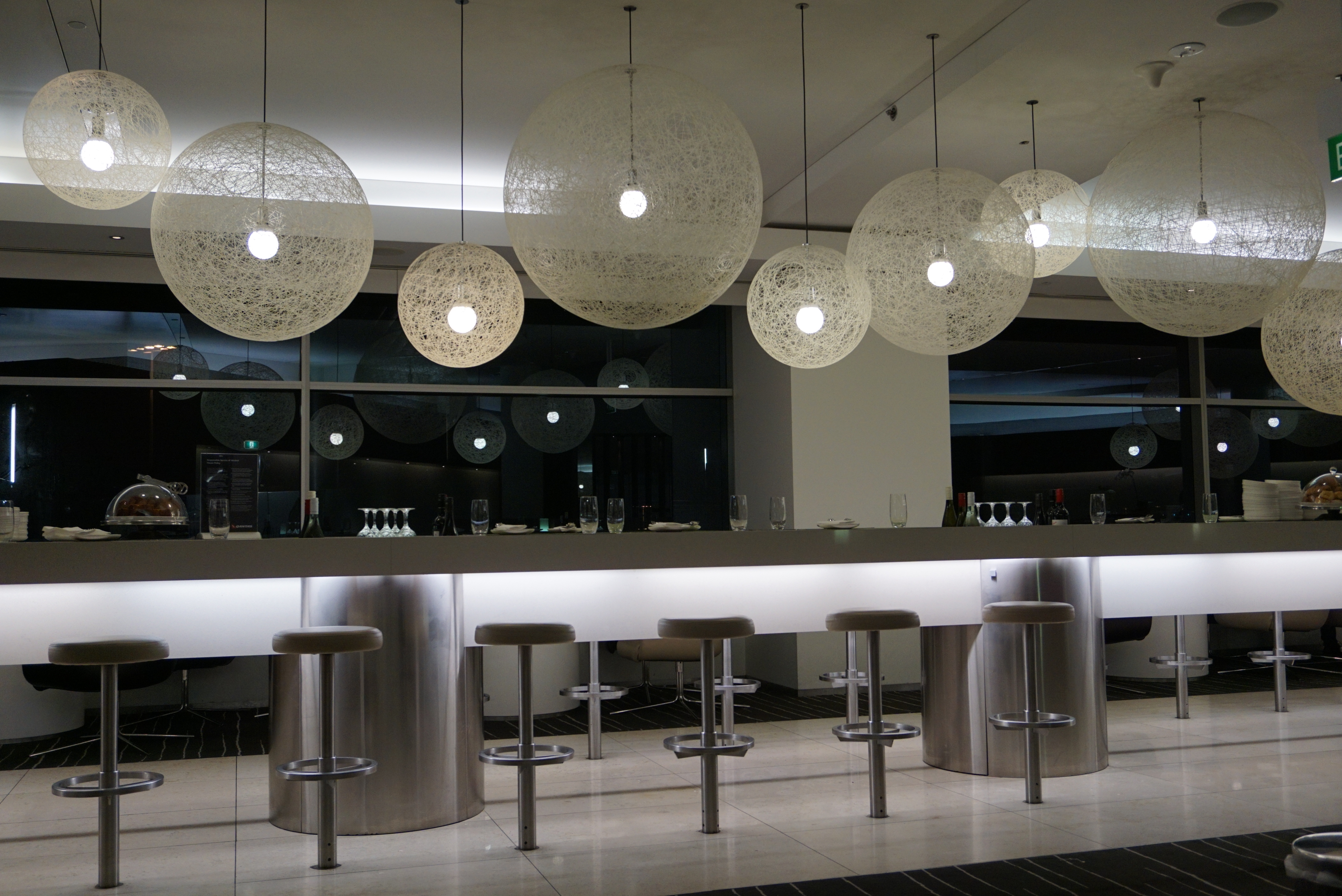
The Qantas International Business Lounge at Sydney Airport

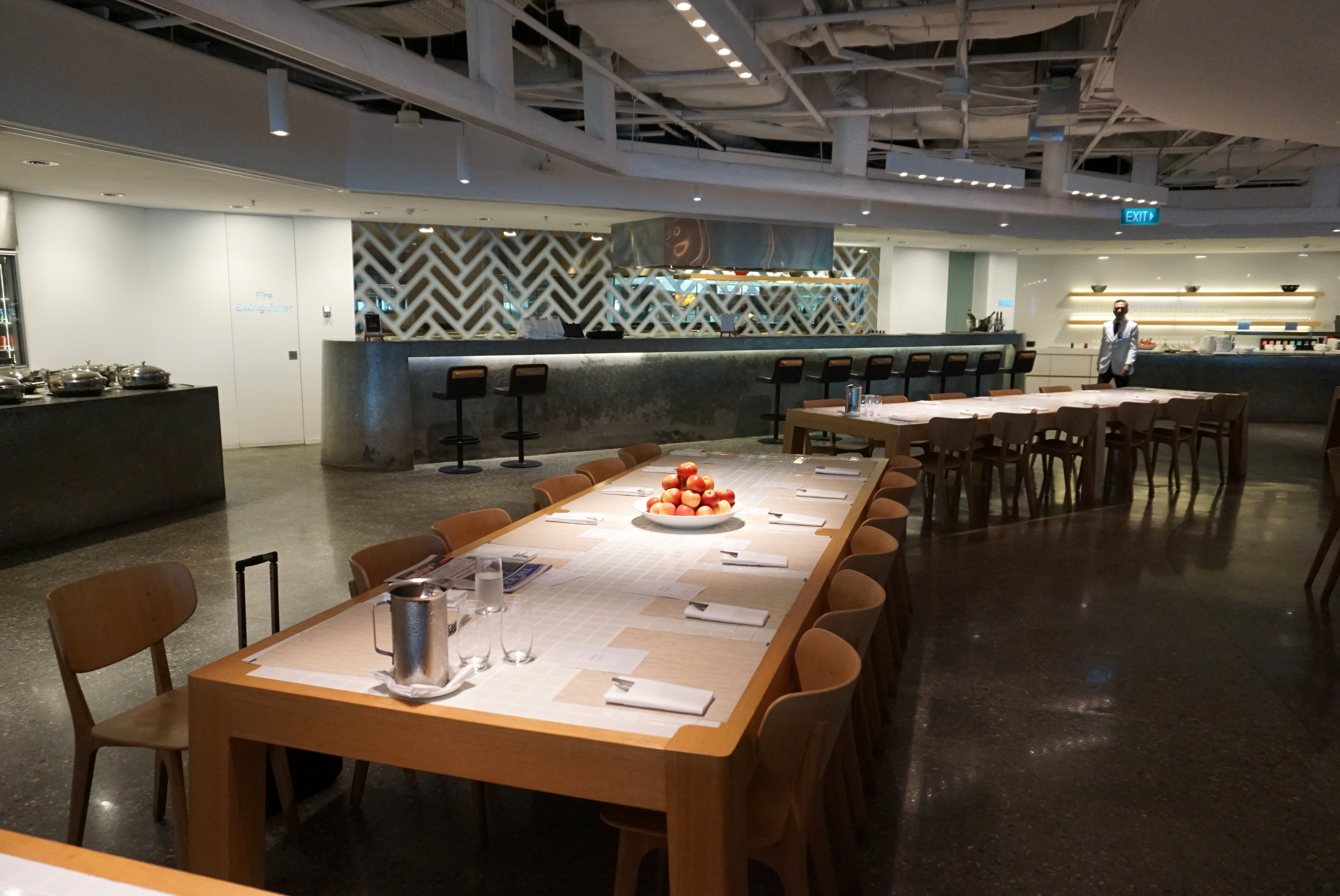
The Qantas International Business Lounge at Singapore Changi Airport

==== Chairman's Lounge ====
Qantas operates domestic Chairman's Lounges in Adelaide, Brisbane, Canberra, Melbourne, Perth and Sydney. Compared to domestic Qantas club and Business lounges the Chairman's Lounge offers superior food and beverage. Access is only available to Qantas Chairman's Lounge Members which is via invitation-only. Chairman's Lounge Memberships are often given to Australian politicians, celebrities, high-profile members of the media and company executives that hold major corporate travel accounts with Qantas.

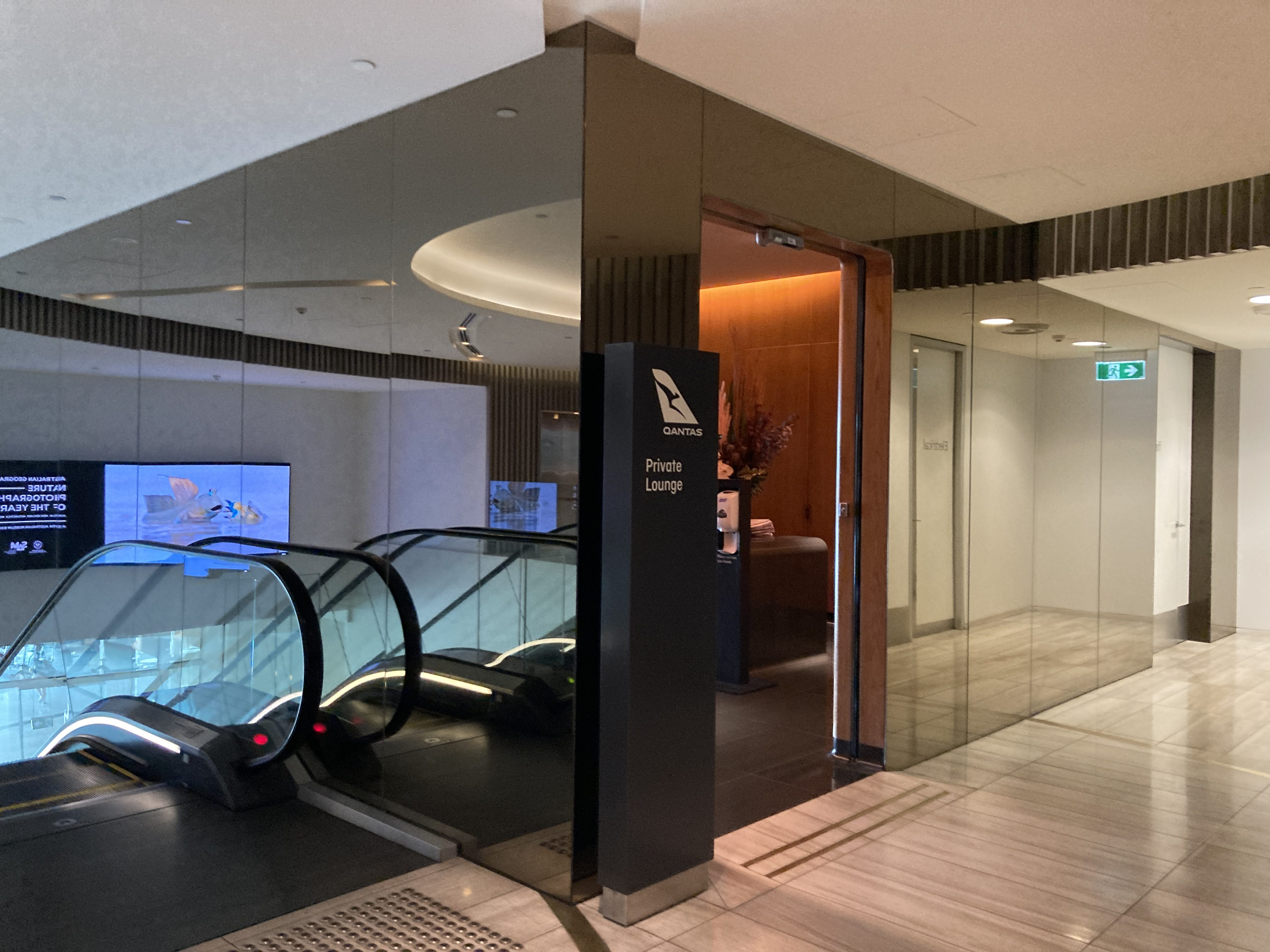
Entrance to the Qantas Chairman's Lounge at Canberra Airport

==== Domestic Business Lounge ====
Qantas operates domestic Business Lounges in Brisbane, Canberra, Melbourne, Perth and Sydney. A new Adelaide business lounge is currently under construction and will open in mid-2025. Access is available to domestic Business Class, Qantas Platinum, Platinum One, and Oneworld Emerald frequent flyers travelling on a Qantas, Jetstar or Oneworld flight. Compared to Qantas Club lounges the Business Lounges generally offer superior food and beverage.

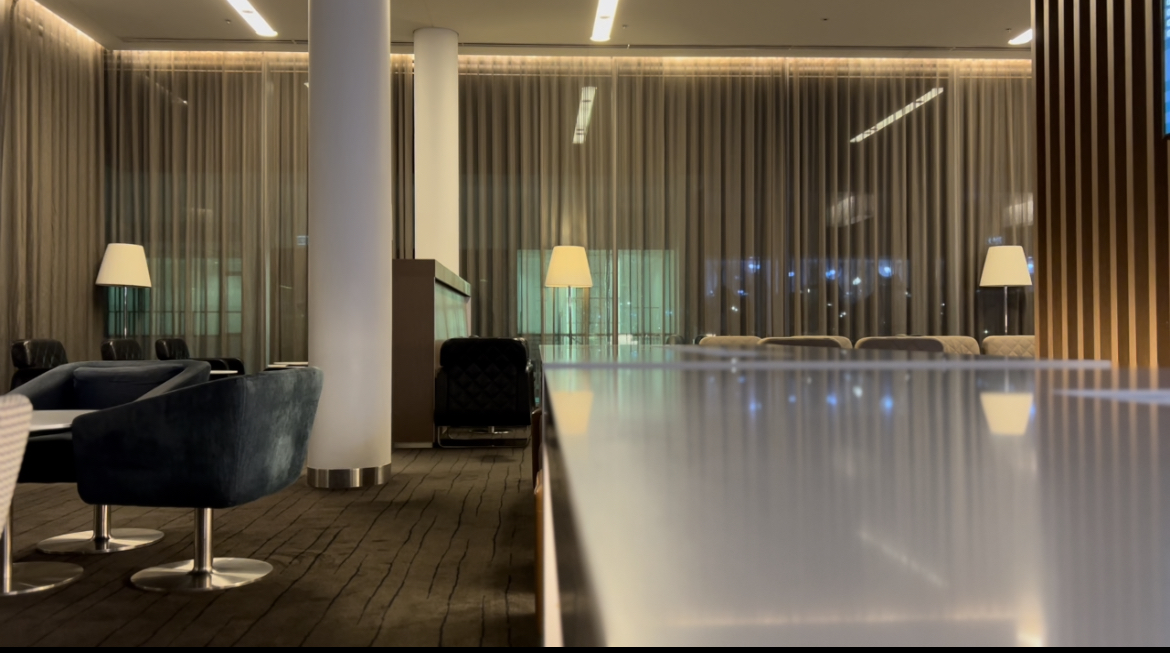
The Qantas Domestic Business Lounge at Canberra Airport

==== The Qantas Club ====
Qantas operates 12 domestic Qantas Club lounges across Australia. Access is available to Qantas domestic Business Class travellers, Qantas Club Members, Qantas Gold, Platinum and Platinum One, Oneworld Sapphire and Emerald frequent flyers when travelling on a Qantas, Jetstar or Oneworld flight.

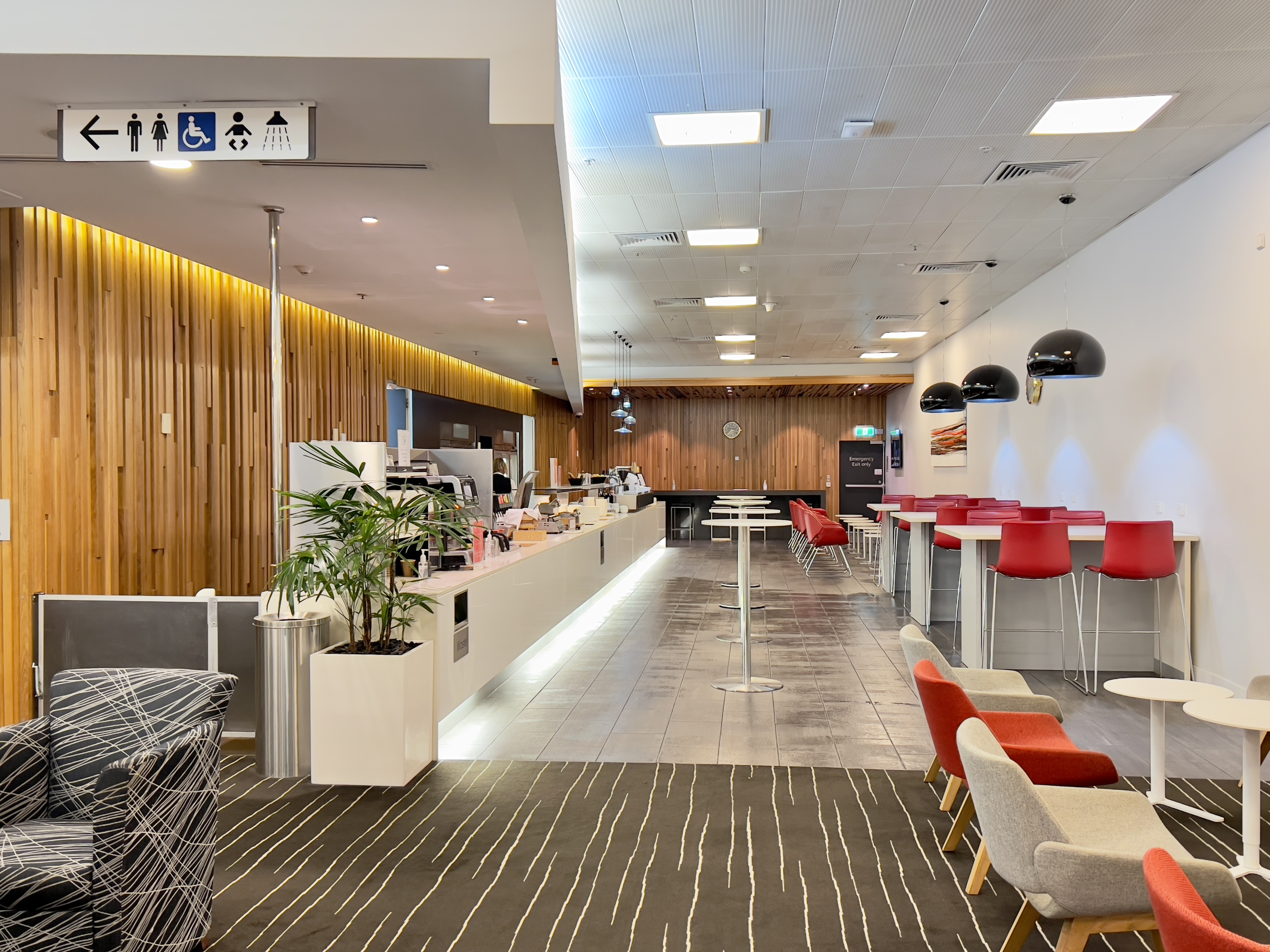
The Qantas Club Lounge at Gold Coast Airport

==== Regional lounges ====
Qantas operates 'regional' lounges in Broome, Coffs Harbour, Devonport, Emerald, Gladstone, Kalgoorlie, Karratha, Launceston, Mackay, Port Hedland, Rockhampton, Tamworth and Townsville. Access requirements are identical to those of the Qantas Club.

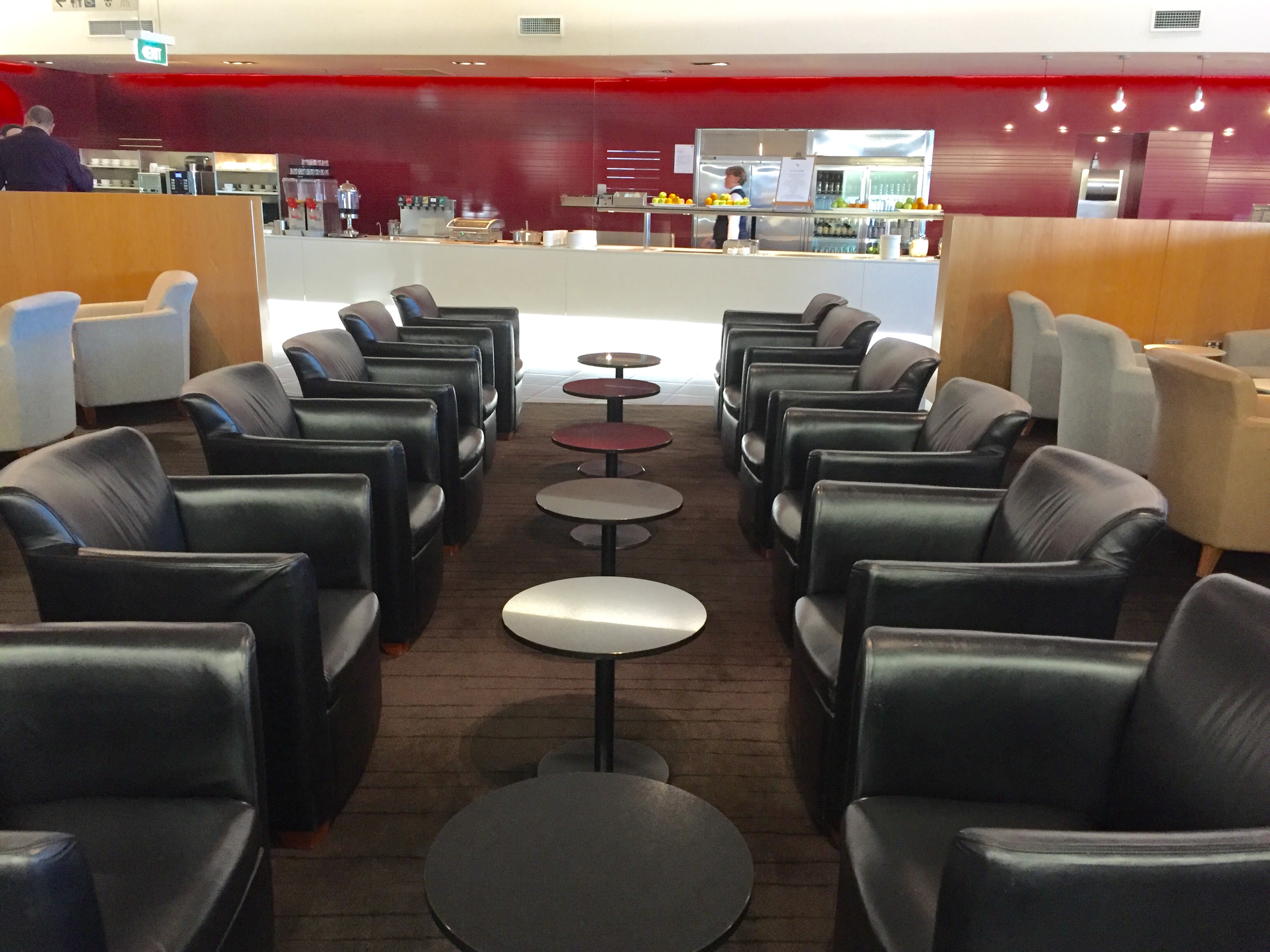
The Qantas Regional Lounge at Townsville Airport

The upgrades are intended to provide improved comfort and a more contemporary design, with refreshed interiors, new furniture, and upgraded technology.

==== Lounge access ====
Qantas Club Members, Gold Frequent Flyers, and Oneworld Sapphire holders are permitted to enter domestic Qantas Clubs when flying on Qantas or Jetstar flights along with one guest who must be travelling. Platinum and Oneworld Emerald Members are permitted to bring in two guests who must be travelling. Internationally, members using Qantas International Business Class lounges (or the Oneworld equivalent). Guests of the member must be travelling to gain access to international lounges. When flying with American Airlines, members have access to Admirals Club lounges and when flying on British Airways, members have access to British Airways' Terraces and Galleries Lounges. Travellers holding Oneworld Sapphire or Emerald status are also allowed in Qantas Club lounges worldwide.

Access to Qantas First lounges is open to passengers travelling on internationally operated Qantas or Oneworld first-class flights, as well as Qantas platinum and Oneworld emerald frequent flyers. Emirates first-class passengers are also eligible for access to the Qantas first lounges in Sydney and Melbourne.

The Qantas Club also offers membership by paid subscription (one, two, or four years) or by achievement of Gold or Platinum frequent flyer status. Benefits of membership include lounge access, priority check-in, priority luggage handling and increased luggage allowances.

== Design, hospitality, and lifestyle ==
=== Design ===
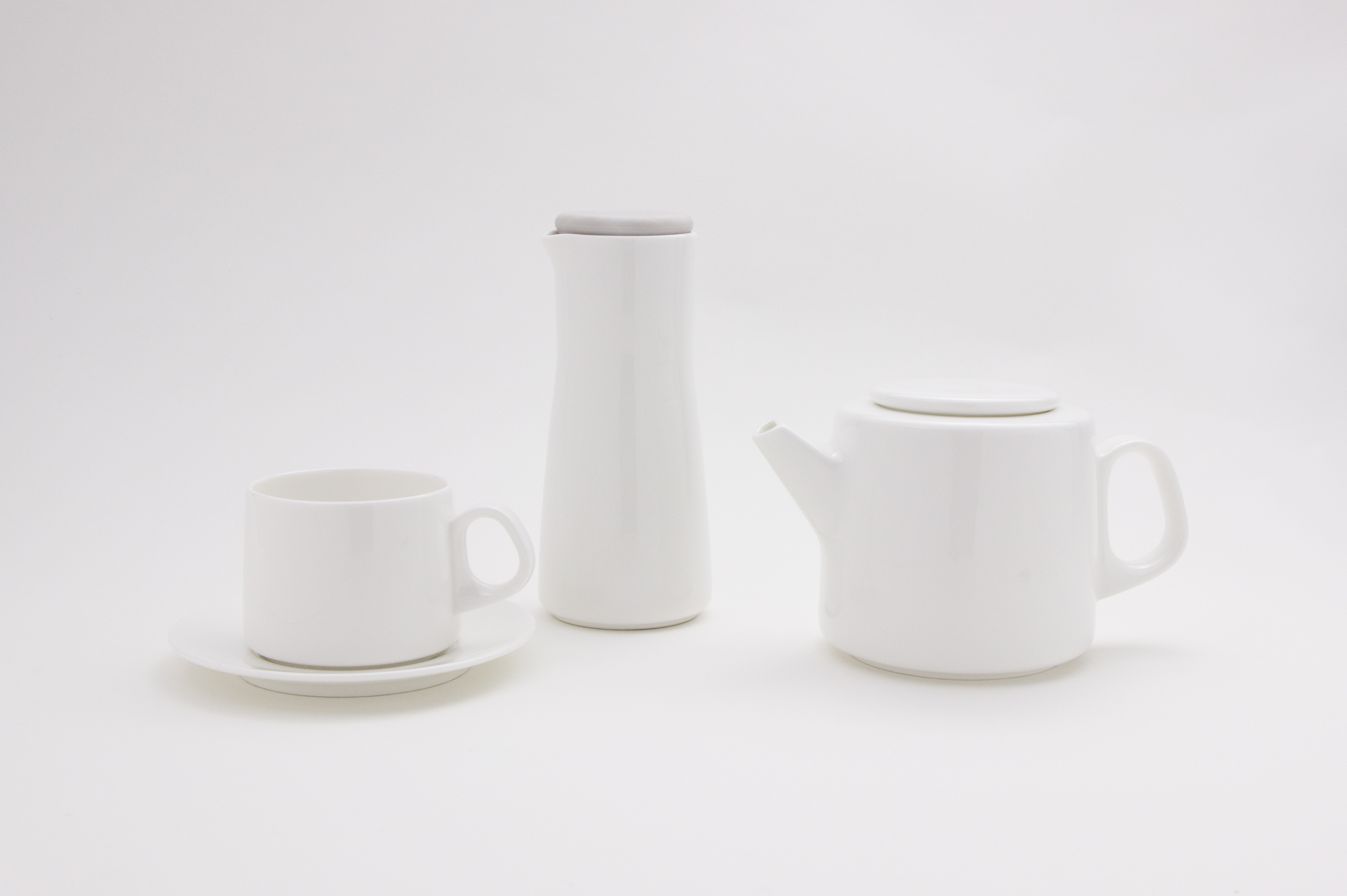
Noritake for Qantas Tableware by David Caon

Beginning in the early 2000s, Qantas began working with industrial designer Marc Newson on cabin interiors, product design and first-class lounges. This collaboration resulted in the introduction of the Skybed business class seat in 2003. The design won several important awards and has been described as "the crown jewel of a $385 million modernization process" which led to the designer being named as the first Creative Director of Qantas in 2006. Newson was later responsible for the design of the Qantas A380 fleet which first entered service in 2008, as well as the Sydney first class lounge.

Newson protégé David Caon, since 2016, has been enlisted by Qantas for product design. Caon has designed the cabins of current Qantas Boeing 787, A380 and A220 aircraft, as well as upcoming Airbus A350 and Airbus A321neo aircraft. Caon has also designed new international first and business lounges, domestic business and club lounges, regional lounges, furniture, and accessories. Furniture featured in Qantas first-class lounges and onboard has been manufactured by companies such as Poltrona Frau, Cappellini, Alessi, Tai Ping and Noritake. Qantas has also worked with Sydney's Charles Perkins Centre to conduct research to determine optimal lighting conditions to reduce jetlag on long-haul flights and improve comfort and health "before, during and after long-haul flights".

Qantas has received various awards for design.

Qantas aesthetic luggage tags, launched in 2024 and given to members of Qantas Frequent Flyer based on their tier

=== Catering ===
Australian chef and entrepreneur Neil Perry has been responsible for the onboard and ground based culinary offerings of the airline since becoming the director of food, beverage, and service in 1997, and currently Qantas' catering operations are supplied by dnata. In 2022, to celebrate the 25-year collaboration with Perry, Qantas reintroduced a selection of his most popular inflight and lounge dishes. Qantas is currently the only airline in Australia to offer complimentary meals, snacks and beverages on all domestic flights, including regional QantasLink services.

=== Uniform and grooming ===
Paris-based Australian designer Martin Grant is responsible for the current Qantas uniforms that were unveiled on 16 April 2013. These were to replace the previous uniforms, dubbed colloquially as "Morrissey" by staff after the designer, Peter Morrissey. The new outfits feature a colour palette of black, red and fuchsia pink. Qantas chief executive Alan Joyce stated that the new design "speaks of Australian style on the global stage" at the launch event that involved employees modelling the uniforms. Grant consulted with Qantas staff members over the course of one year to finalise the 35 styles that were eventually created. Not all employees were happy with the new uniform, however, with one flight attendant saying "The uniforms are really tight and they are simply not practical for the very physical job we have to do." In 2020 Grant also designed a Qantas branded athleisure-wear collection.

Qantas declared in 2023 that it had ended uniform rules based on gender. Female flight attendants are no longer required to wear high heels, male flight attendants can wear makeup, and flight attendants of any gender can wear the same type of jewelry and have long hair in a ponytail or bun. At the end of January 2025, Qantas announced plans to refresh the uniforms for its onboard crews. The airline says that they will now engage with several Australian designers to review the requirements and undertake a selection process for what will become the eleventh uniform in its history. The next uniform designer will be announced in the coming months with Qantas planning to debut the new design in 2027 alongside Qantas’ huge fleet renewal program. Additionally, Qantas will start surveying its uniformed workforce to assist in developing the new outfits.

== Liveries ==
=== Indigenous art liveries ===
Two Qantas aircraft are currently painted in an Indigenous Australian art scheme. One aircraft, a Boeing 737-800 registered as VH-XZJ, wears a livery called Mendoowoorrji, which was revealed in November 2013. The design was drawn from the late West Australian Aboriginal artist Paddy Bedford. The second, a Boeing 787 registered VH-ZND, is adorned in a paint scheme inspired by the late Emily Kame Kngwarreye's 1991 painting Yam Dreaming. The adaptation of Yam Dreaming to the aircraft, led by Balarinji, a Sydney-based and Aboriginal-owned design firm, incorporates the red Qantas tailfin into the design, which includes white dots with red and orange tones. The design depicts the yam plant, an important and culturally significant symbol in Kngwarreye's Dreaming stories, and a staple food source in her home region of Utopia. The design was applied to the aircraft during manufacture, prior to its delivery in March 2018 to Alice Springs Airport, situated 230 kilometres southeast of Utopia, where the aircraft was met by Kngwarreye's descendants, the local community, and Qantas executives. The aircraft would later operate Qantas' inaugural nonstop services between Perth and London Heathrow, and between Melbourne and San Francisco, scheduled with Boeing 787 aircraft.

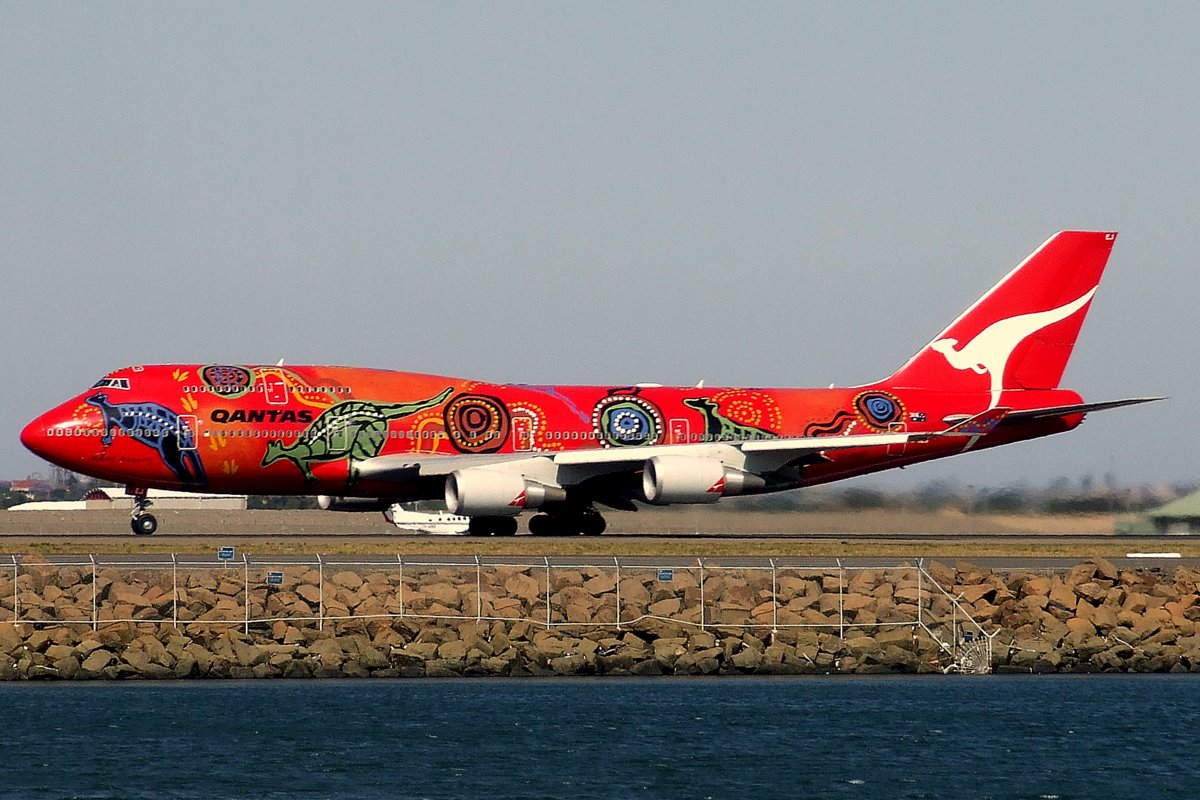
A Boeing 747-400ER in 2006 wearing the Wunala Dreaming livery. From 2003 to 2012, it was the second aircraft to carry the colour scheme.

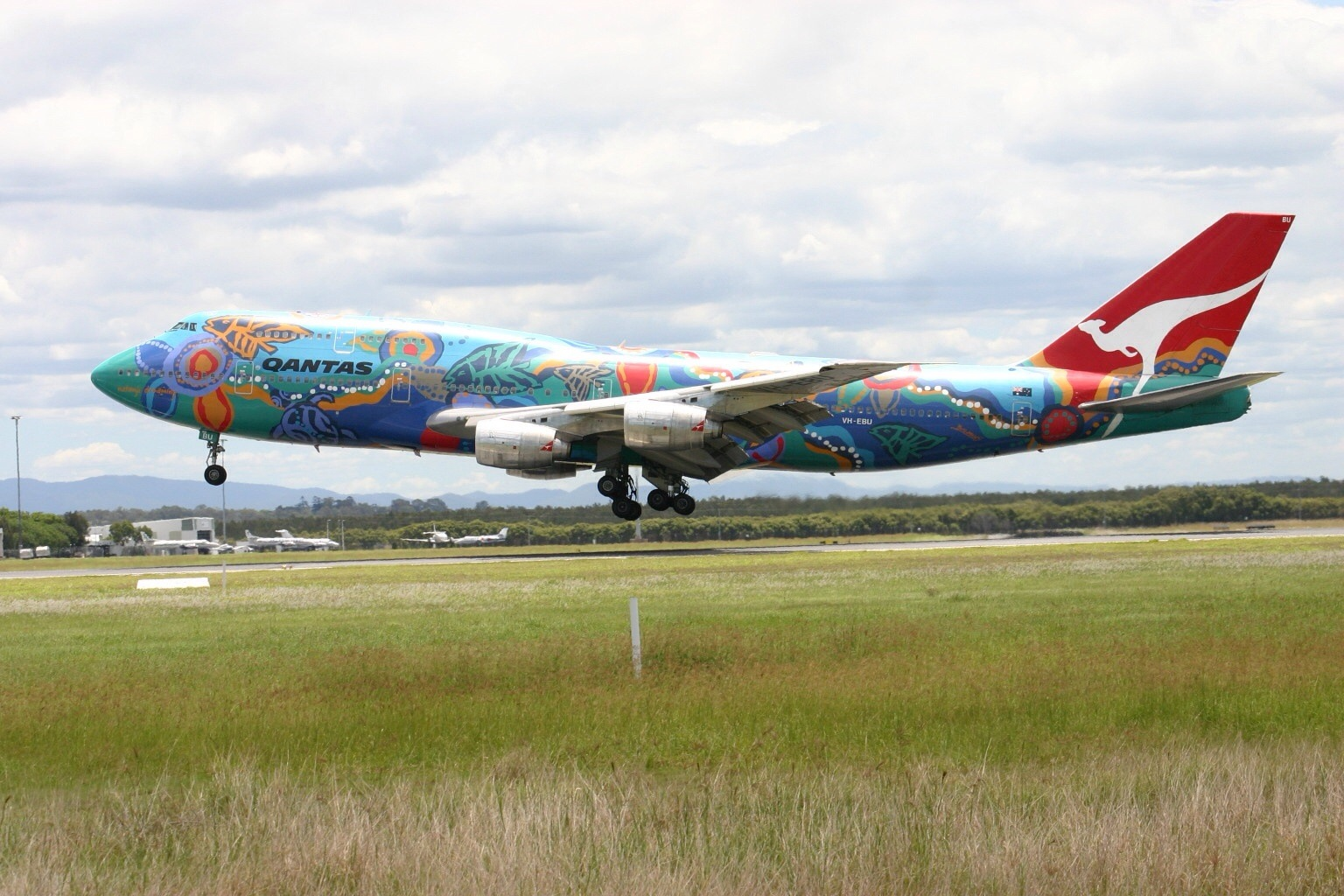
A Boeing 747-300 in 2004 wearing the Nalanji Dreaming livery. The aircraft carried the colour scheme from 1995 to 2005.

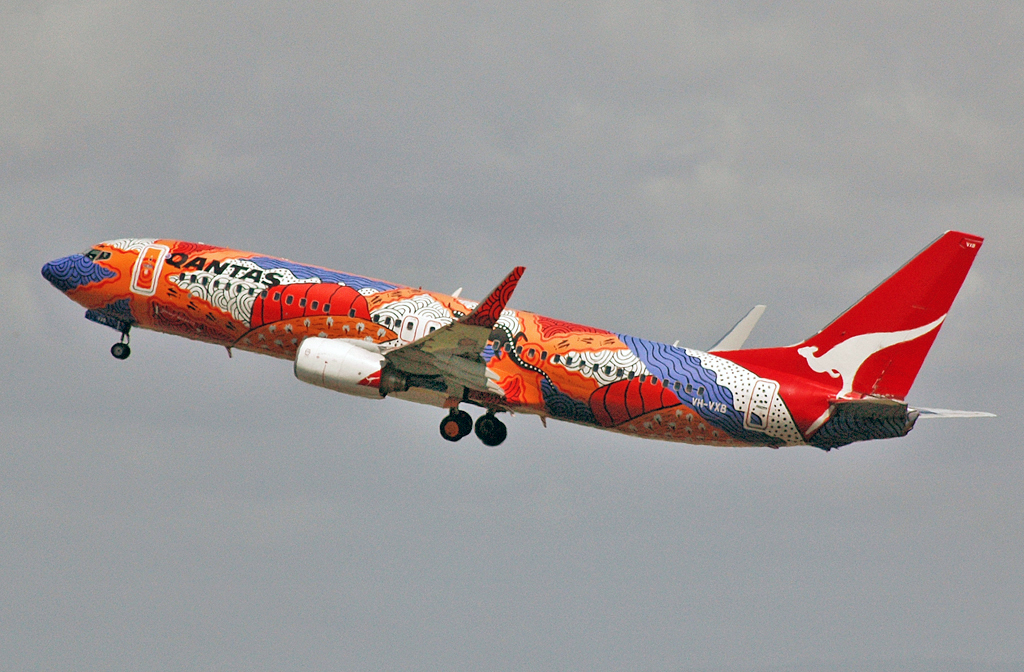
A Boeing 737-800 in 2005 wearing the Yananyi Dreaming livery, which drew on the work of internationally renowned Pitjantjatjara artist Rene Kulitja. The aircraft carried the colour scheme from 2002 to 2014.

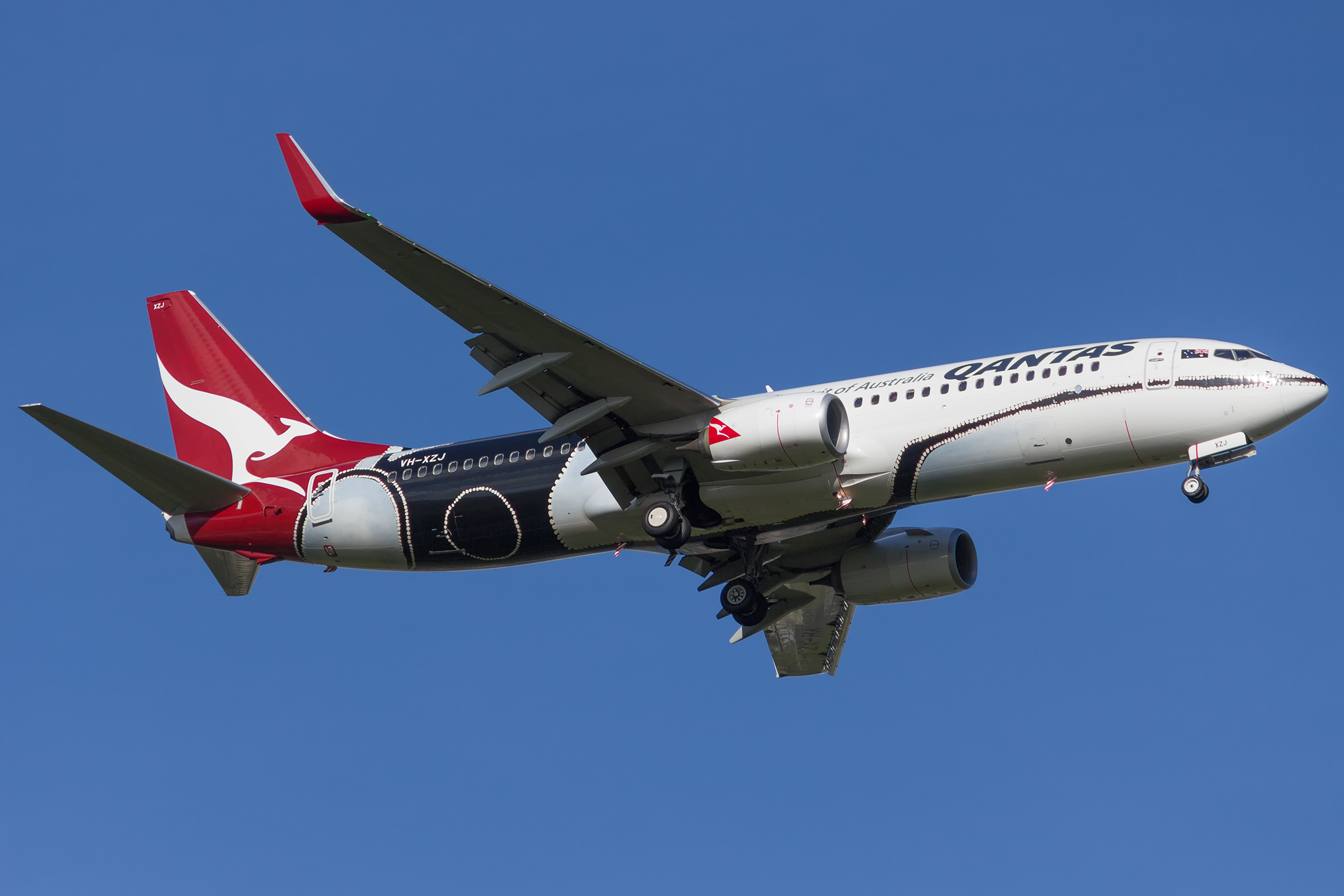
A Boeing 737-800 in 2015 wearing the Mendoowoorrji livery, Inspired by the work of the late West Australian Gija painter Paddy Bedford's 2005 painting 'Medicine Pocket'. The aircraft has carried the colour scheme since 2013.

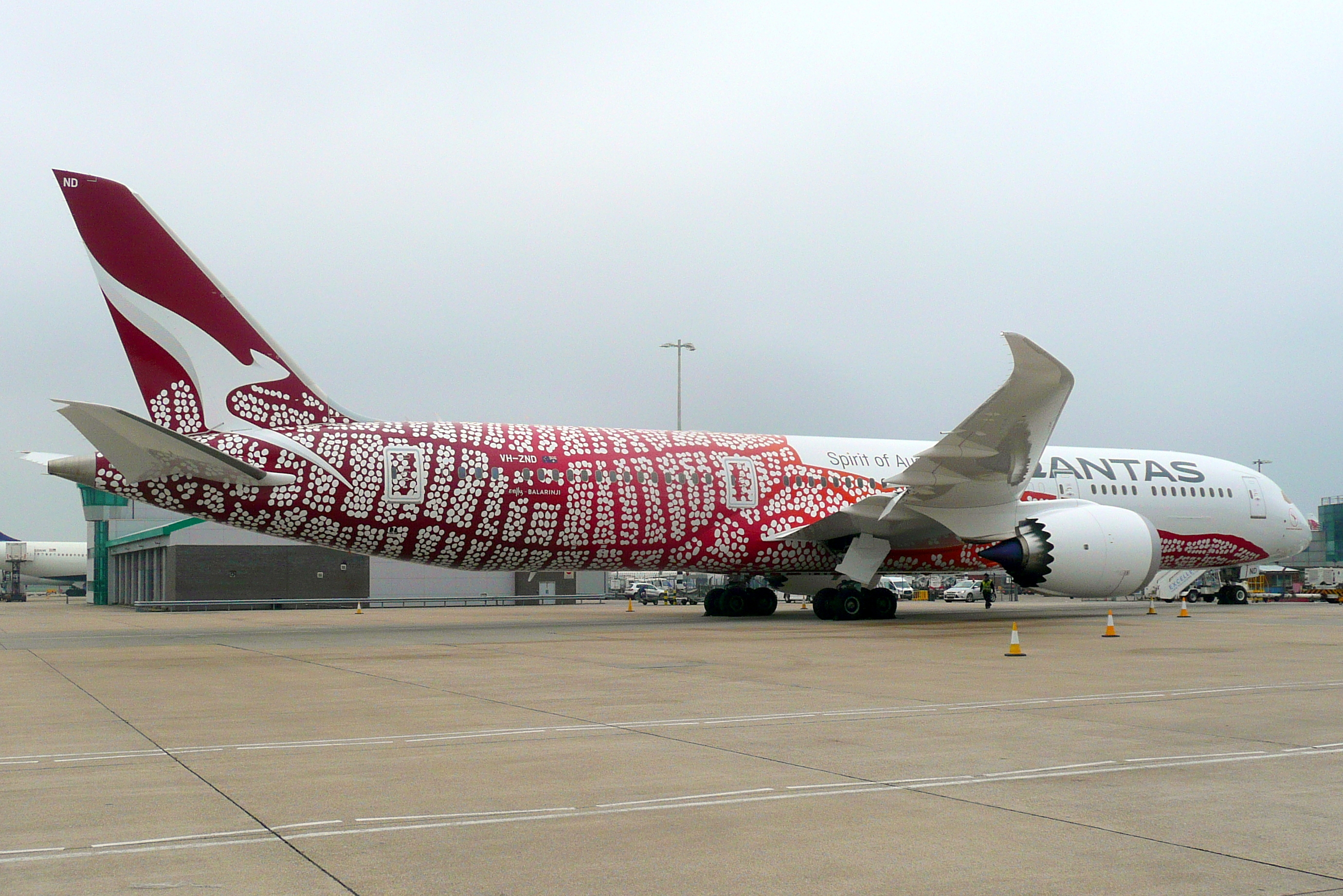
A Boeing 787-9 in 2018 wearing the Yam Dreaming livery, based on internationally renowned artist Emily Kame Kngwarreye's 1991 painting 'Yam Dreaming'. The aircraft has carried the colour scheme since 2018.

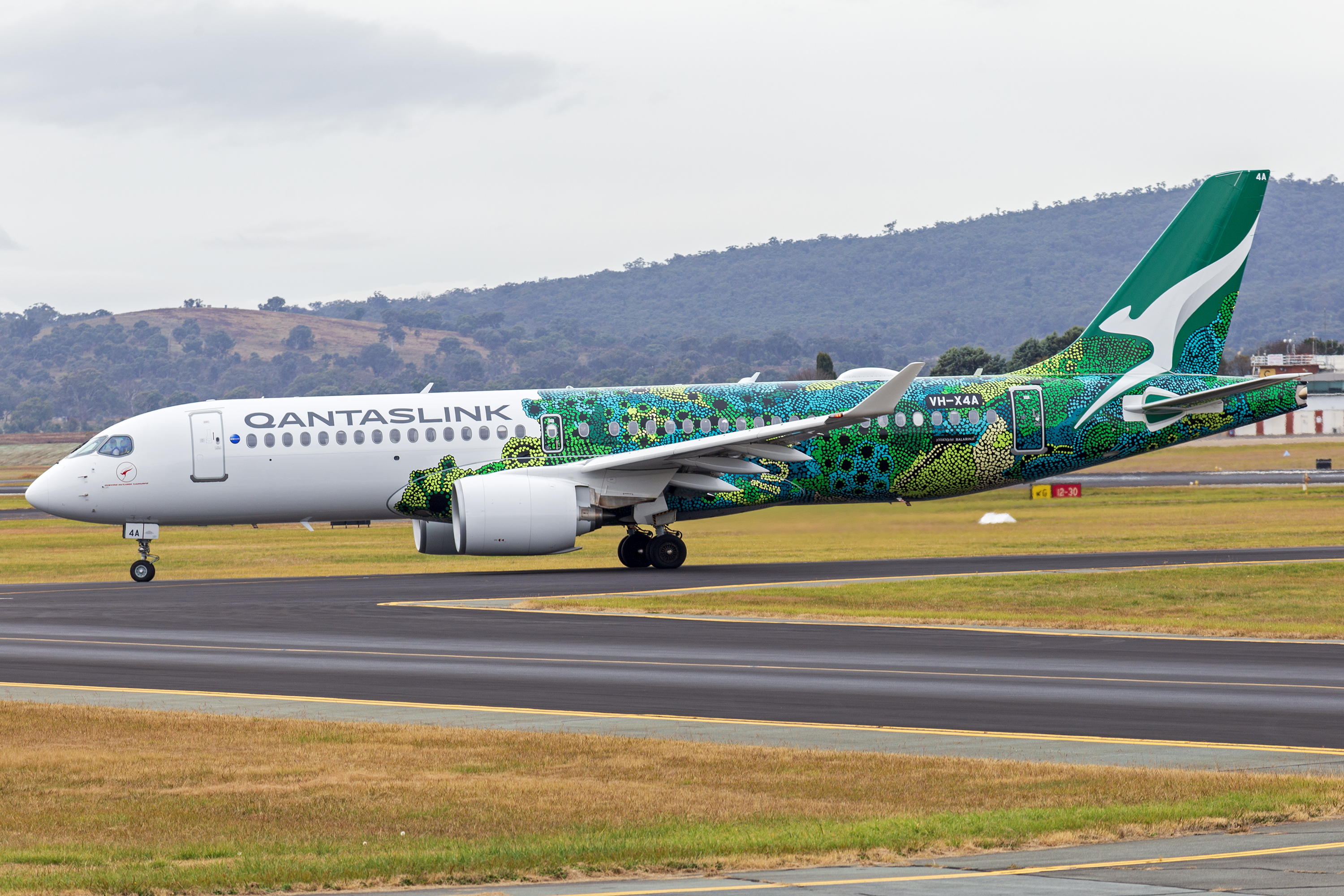
The first Airbus A220 to be delivered to the regional arm QantasLink, wearing the Minyma Kutjara Tjukurpa livery since 2023. It features the artwork of renowned Pitjantjatjara artist Maringka Baker.

Australian Aboriginal art designs have previously adorned some Qantas aircraft; the first design was called Wunala Dreaming, which was unveiled in 1994 and had been painted on now-retired Boeing 747-400 and 747-400ER aircraft between 1994 and 2012. The motif was an overall-red design depicting ancestral spirits in the form of kangaroos travelling in the outback.

The second design was called Nalanji Dreaming and was depicted on a Boeing 747-300 from 1995 until its retirement in 2005. Nalanji Dreaming was a bright blue design inspired by rainforest landscape and tropical seas.

The third design was titled Yananyi Dreaming, and featured a depiction of Uluru. The scheme was designed by Uluru-based artist Rene Kulitja, in collaboration with Balarinji. It was painted on the 737 at the Boeing factory prior to its delivery in 2002. It was repainted into the standard livery in 2014.

=== Retro Roo liveries ===
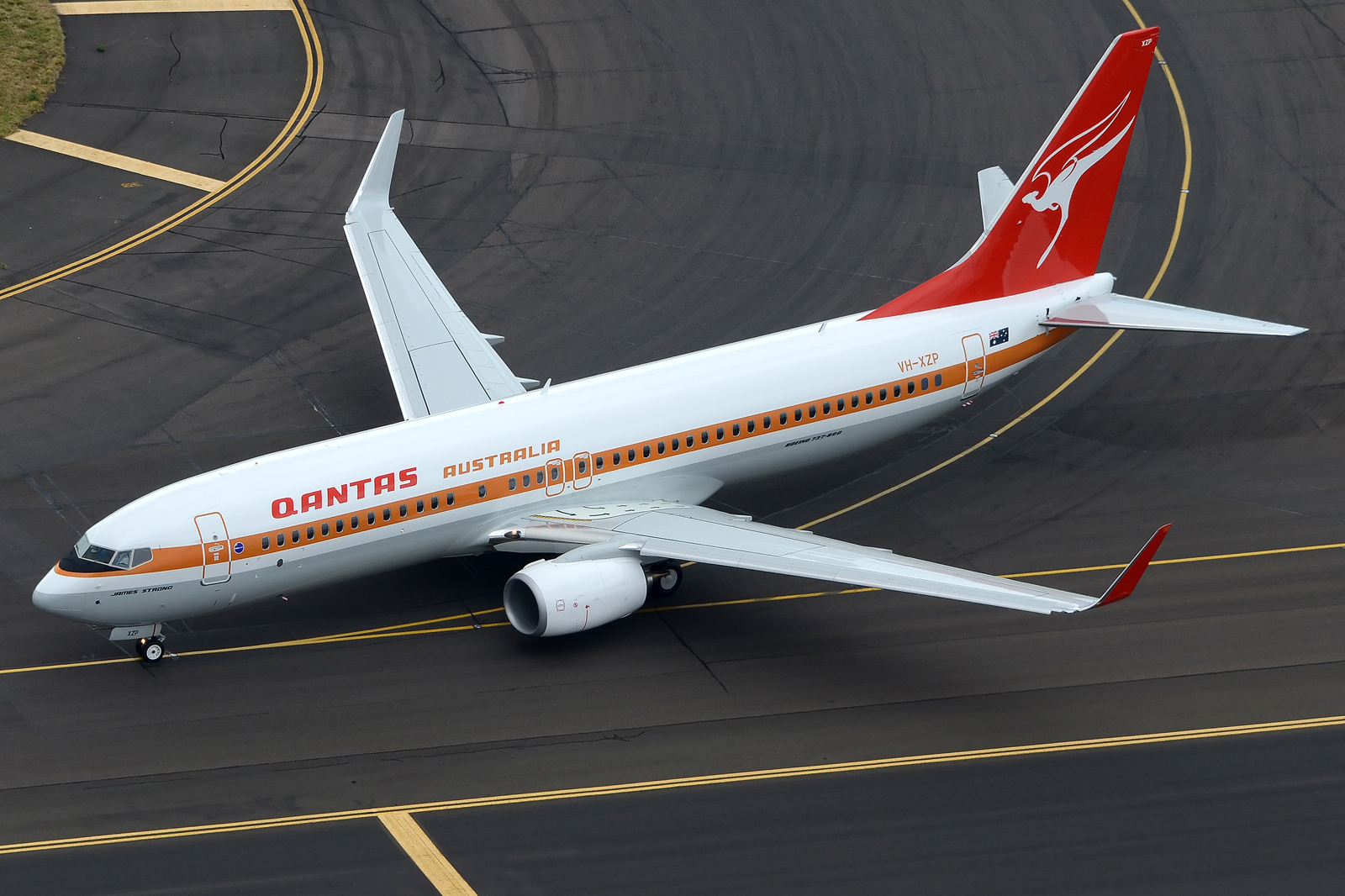
1971 retrojet livery (2014)

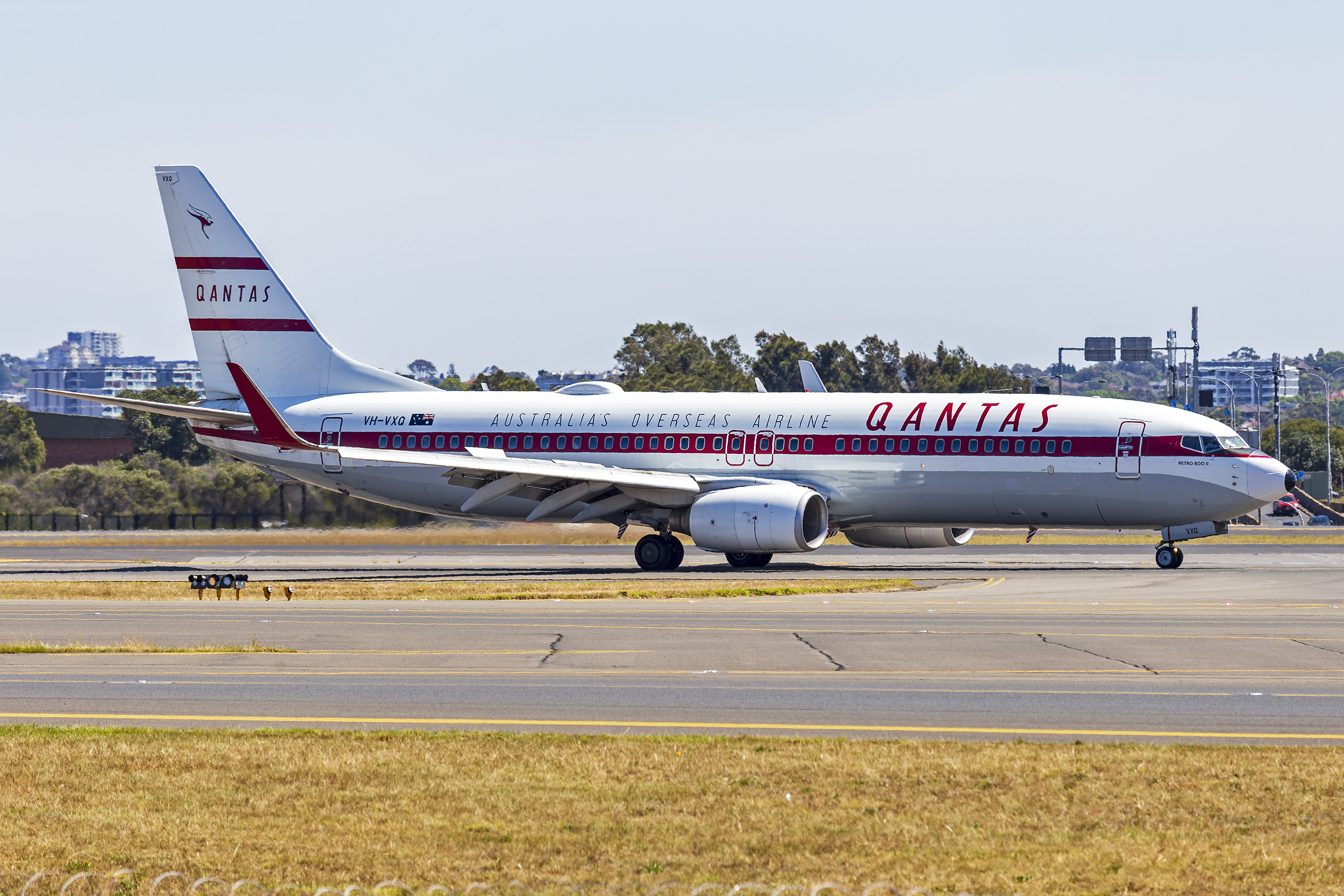
1959 retrojet livery (2015)

Boeing 737-800s in 'retro-roo' schemes

In November 2014 the airline revealed that the 75th Boeing 737-800 jet to be delivered would carry a 'retro-livery' based on the airline's 1971 'ochre' colour scheme design featuring the iconic 'Flying Kangaroo' on its tail and other aspects drawn from its 1970s fleet. The aircraft was delivered on 17 November.

Qantas announced a second 737-800 would receive a 'retro roo' livery in October 2015. On 16 November 2015 the airline unveiled the second 'retro roo' 737, bearing a replica livery from 1959 to celebrate the airline's 95th birthday.

=== Other liveries ===
Several Qantas aircraft have been decorated with promotional liveries, promoting telecommunications company Optus; the Disney motion picture Planes; the Australian national association football team, the Socceroos; and the Australian national rugby union team, the Wallabies. Two aircraft – an Airbus A330–200 and a Boeing 747-400ER – were decorated with special liveries promoting the Oneworld airline alliance (of which Qantas is a member) in 2009. On 29 September 2014, nonstop Airbus A380 service to Dallas/Fort Worth International Airport was inaugurated using an A380 decorated with a commemorative cowboy hat and bandana on the kangaroo tail logo. Prior to the 2017 Sydney Mardi Gras, Qantas decorated one of its Airbus A330-300 aircraft with rainbow lettering and depicted a rainbow flag on the tail of the aircraft.

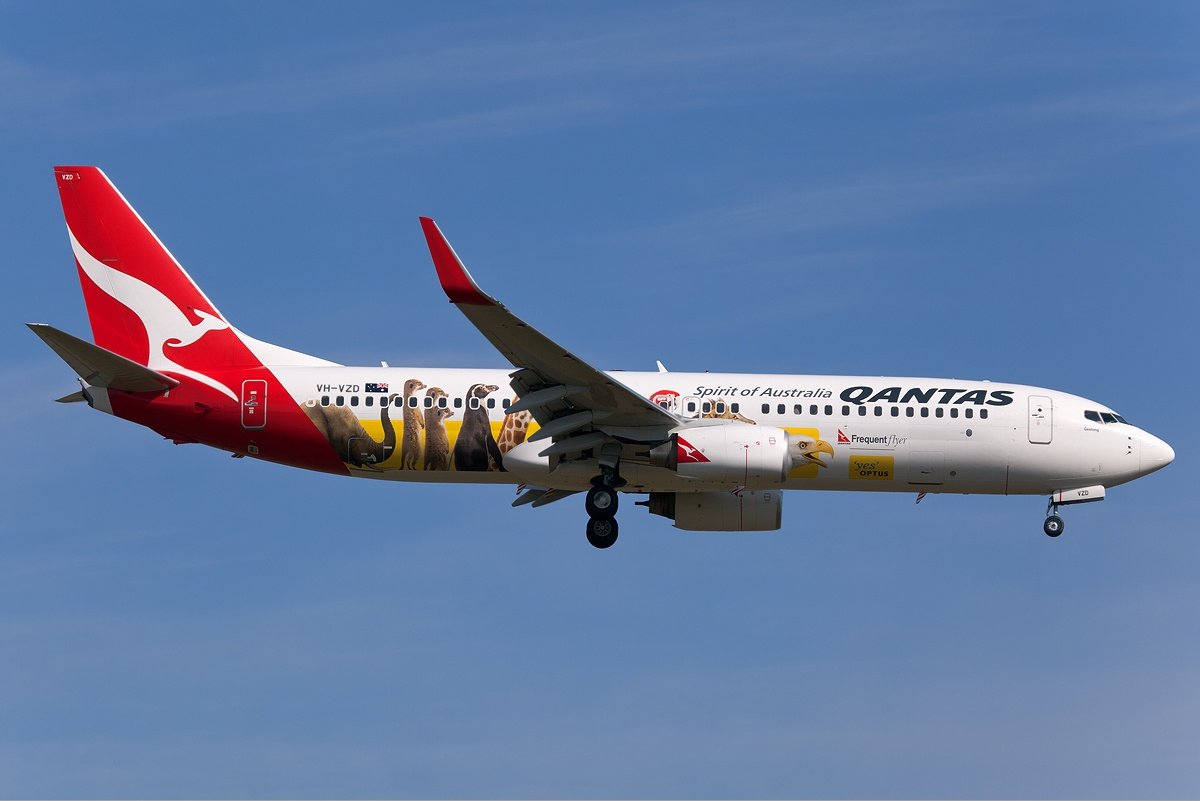
VH–VZD advertising Optus

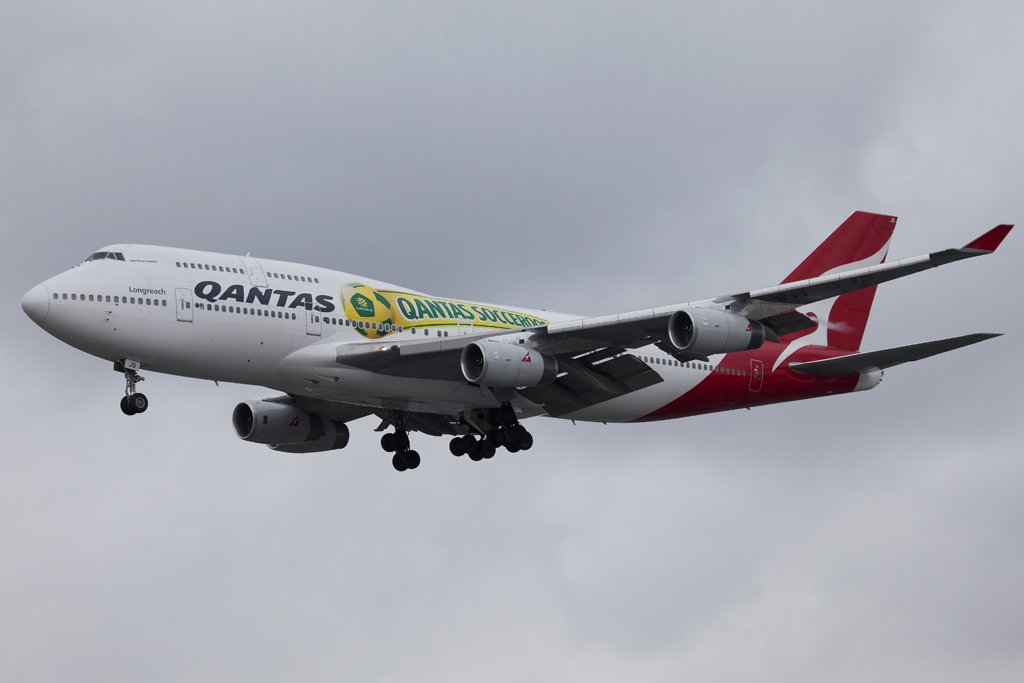
VH–OJS advertising the Socceroos

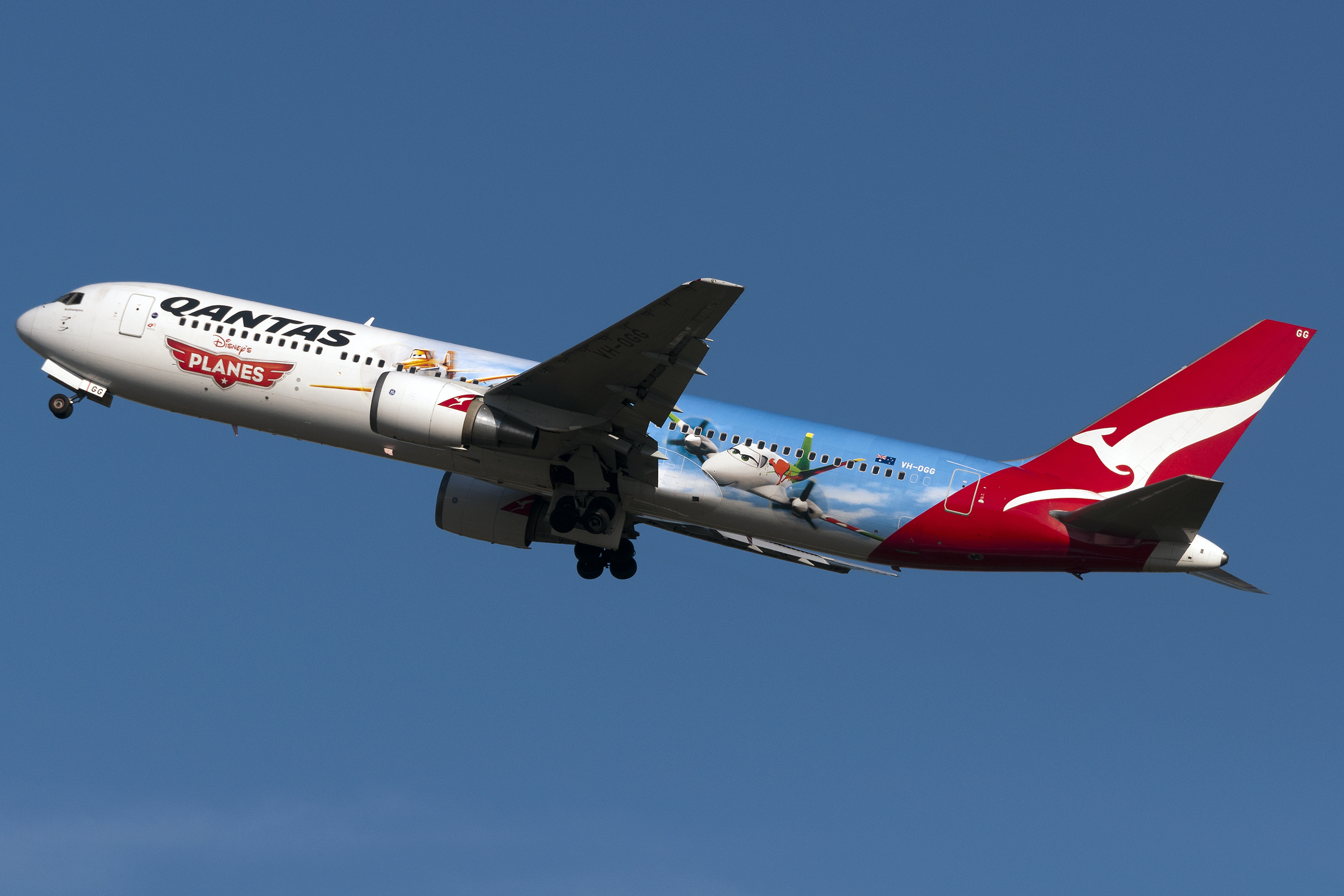
VH–OGG advertising Planes

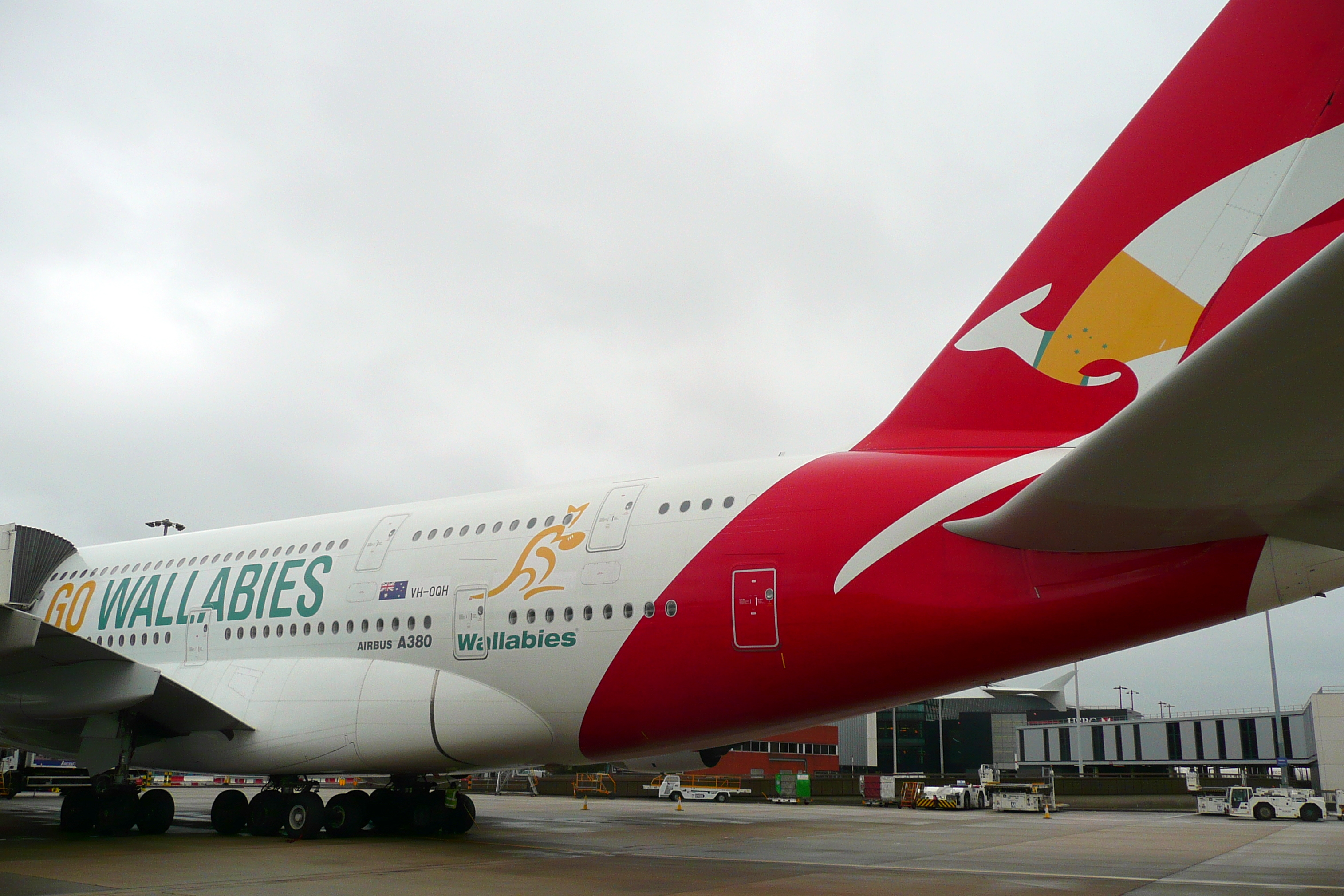
VH–OQH advertising the Wallabies

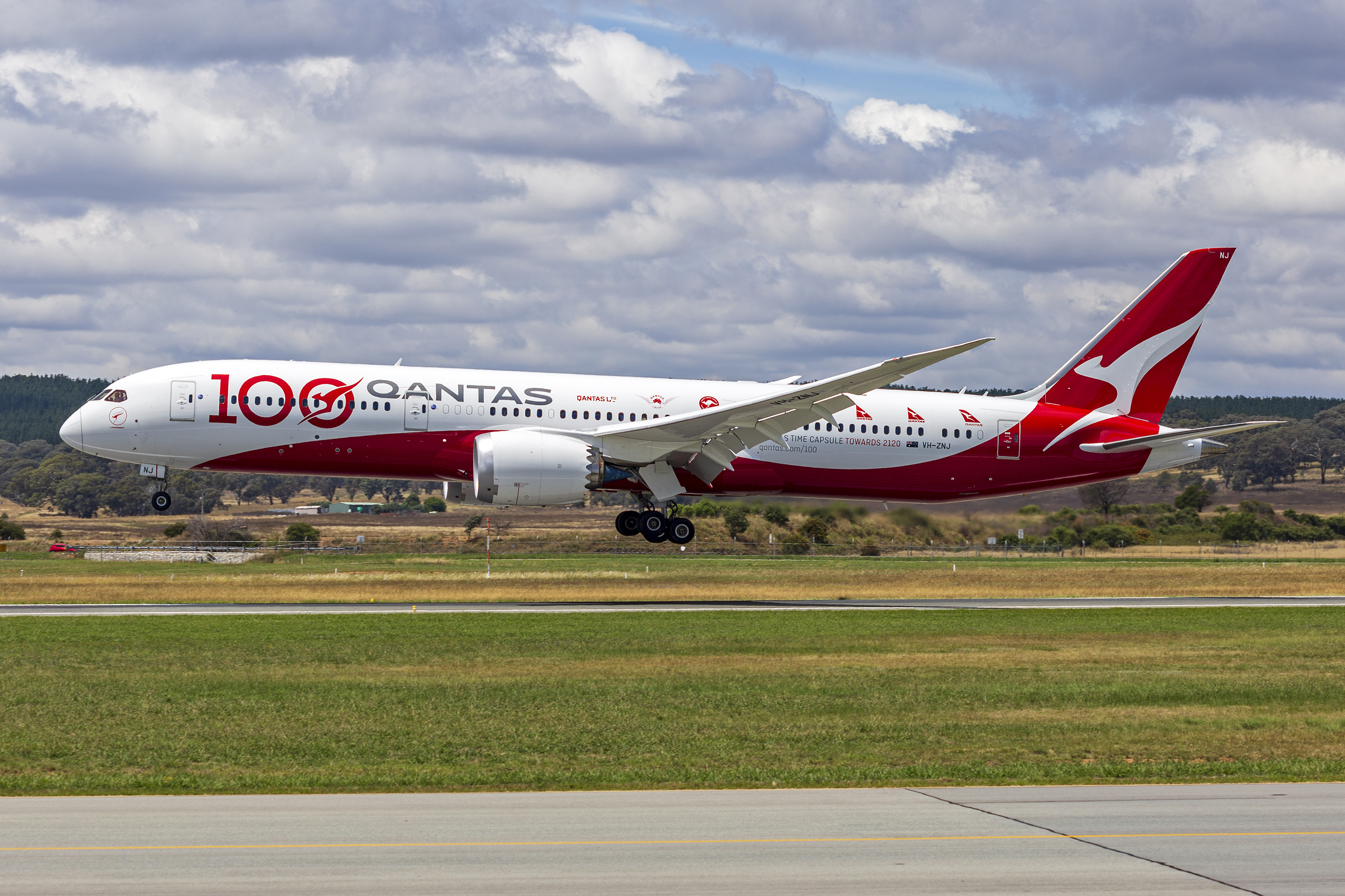
VH–ZNJ with '100th anniversary of Qantas' livery

== Awards ==
- 2003 Good Design Award, Chicago Athenaeum (Skybed)
- 2004 Australian Design Award (Skybed)
- 2017 Better Future Sydney Design Awards – Silver (Qantas current brand identity and livery)
- 2018 BusinessTraveller Cellars in the Sky Awards – Gold – "Best Overall Cellar"
- 2019 Better Future Sydney Design Awards – Gold (Boeing 787-9 Dreamliner 'Flying Art' livery 'Emily Kame Kngwarreye' by Balarinji)
- 2022 Skytrax Awards – World's Top Five Airlines
- 2022 Designers Institute of New Zealand Award (Signage)
- 2022 BusinessTraveller Cellars in the Sky Awards – Silver
- 2023 BusinessTraveller Cellars in the Sky Awards – Gold – "Best Overall Cellar"
- 2023 The Honourable Company of Air Pilots Grand Master's Australian Medal (Qantas Pilot Academy)
- 2024 Crystal Cabin Awards (Airbus A350–1000 Wellbeing Zone)
- 2024 Good Design Awards – Gold (Airbus A220–300 'Flying Art' livery 'Minyma Kutjara Tjukurpa' by Balarinji)
- 2024 Better Future Sydney Design Awards – Gold (Airbus A220–300 'Flying Art' livery 'Minyma Kutjara Tjukurpa' by Balarinji)

=== 'World's safest airline' awards ===
In addition to the above awards, Qantas has consistently ranked in either first or second place in the annual AirlineRatings.com 'World's Safest Airline' awards since their inception in 2014. The 'Operational Safety Audit' from the International Air Transport Association, along with the International Civil Aviation Organisation 'country audit' are used as benchmarks by AirlineRatings.com when determining annual rankings. Qantas was named the world's safest airline from 2014 to 2017, from 2019 to 2021, and again in 2023, second to Air New Zealand in 2018, 2022 and 2024.

== Corporate affairs ==
=== Company heads ===
The company heads of Qantas Airways Limited are only listed from 1993, when Qantas' shares once again traded on the stock exchange as a publicly listed company, following the Australian Government's move to privatise the remaining 75% of the airline. Throughout Qantas' history, since 1920, there have been many structures, branding and variations including the name 'Qantas'. Its current company structure was established in 1993, going from an unlisted public company in which the Commonwealth owned all of the shares, to a listed public company. A full list of Qantas chairpersons and managing directors can be found on the History of Qantas page.

Chairpersons of QANTAS Airways Limited
Order	Chairperson	Period	Reference
1	Gary Pemberton	1993–2000	
2	Margaret Jackson	2000–2007	
3	Leigh Clifford	2007–2018	
4	Richard Goyder	2018–2024	
5	John Mullen	2024–present	
Managing directors / CEOs of QANTAS Airways Limited
Order	MDs / CEOs	Period	Reference
1	James Strong	1993–2001	
2	Geoffrey Dixon	2001–2008	
3	Alan Joyce	2008–2023	
4	Vanessa Hudson	2023–present	

=== Group leadership team ===
The Qantas Group is overseen by the following directors;

- Vanessa Hudson – group chief executive officer and managing director
- Rob Marcolina – group chief financial officer
- Markuss Svenson – chief executive officer, Qantas Domestic
- Mark Dal Pra – chief executive officer, Qantaslink
- Cam Wallace – chief executive officer, Qantas International and Freight
- Stephanie Tully – chief executive officer, Jetstar Group
- Andrew Glance – chief executive officer, Qantas Loyalty and Customer
- Danielle Keighery – group chief corporate affairs and communications officer
- Fiona Messent – group chief sustainability officer
- Andrew Monaghan – group chief risk officer
- Kate Towey – qantas group general counsel
- Catherine Walsh – group chief people officer
- Rachel Yangoyan – chief technology, AI and transformation officer

=== Business trends ===
The key trends for the Qantas Group (Qantas Airways Ltd and Controlled Entities, which includes Jetstar and Qantas Cargo), are shown below, as at year ending 30 June:

	Turnover (A$m)	Net profit (Note: "Statutory profit after tax") (A$m)	Number of employees (FTE)	Number of passengers (m)	Passenger load factor (%)	Number of aircraft (Note: at year end)	References
2008	15,627	970	33,670	38.6	80.7	224	
2009	14,552	123	33,966	38.4	79.6	229	
2010	13,772	116	32,489	41.4	80.8	254	
2011	14,894	249	33,169	44.5	80.1	283	
2012	15,724	−244	33,584	46.7	80.1	308	
2013	15,902	6	33,265	48.2	79.3	312	
2014	15,352	−2,843	30,751	48.8	77.4	308	
2015	15,816	560	28,622	49.2	79.1	299	
2016	16,200	1,029	29,204	52.7	80.1	303	
2017	16,057	853	29,596	53.7	80.6	309	
2018	17,060	980	30,248	55.3	83.2	313	
2019	17,966	891	29,745	55.8	84.2	314	
2020	14,257	−1,964	28,957	40.8	82.3	314	
2021	5,934	−1,728	20,640	15.9	63.2	311	
2022	9,108	−860	21,847	21.3	67.9	322	
2023	19,815	1,744	25,426	45.7	83.3	336	
2024	21,939	1,251	27,467	51.8	82.7	347	
2025	23,823	1,605	28,239	55.9	84.7	363	
2026	25,516	1,289	29,175	55.9	84.5	372	

=== Headquarters ===
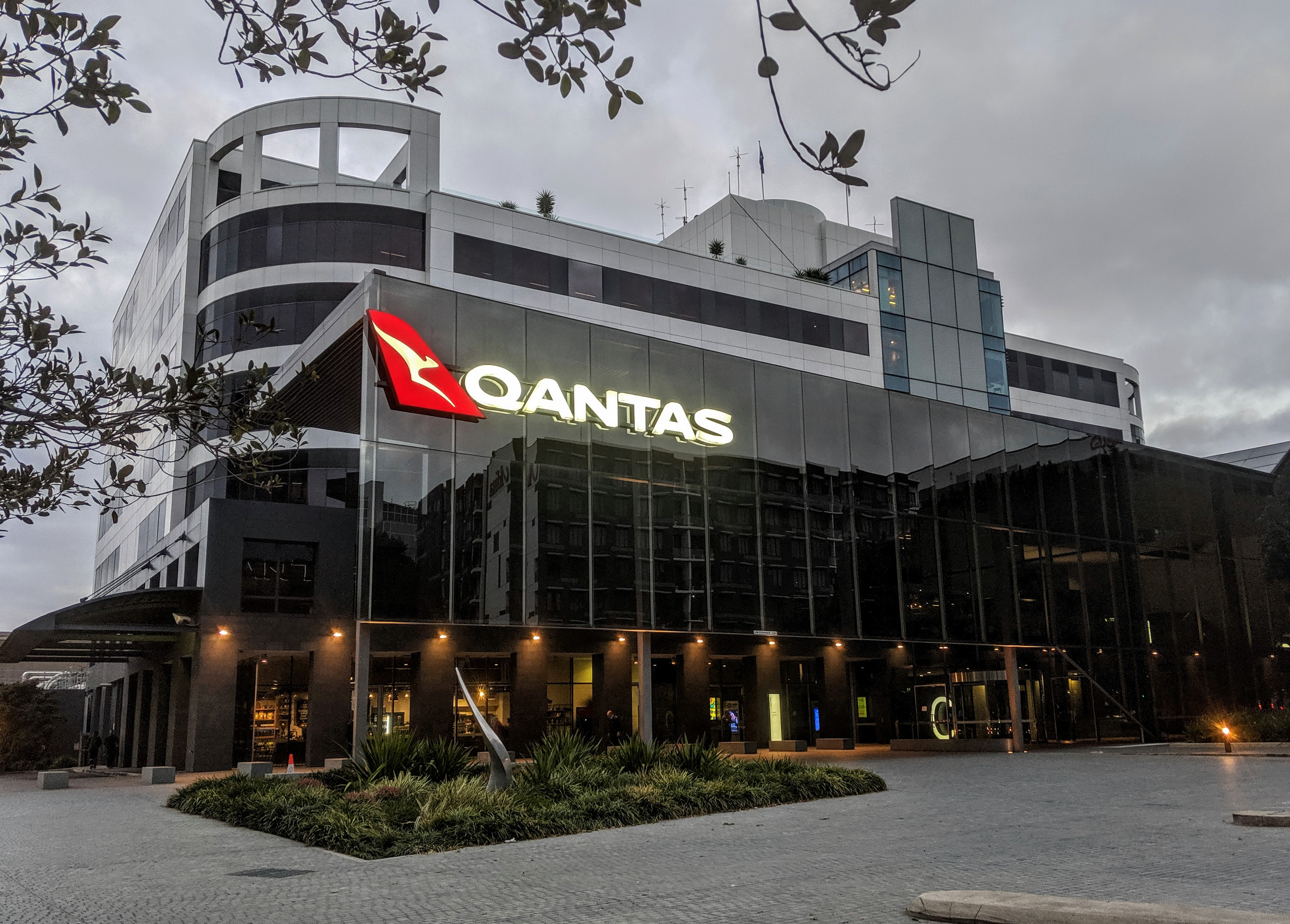
Qantas headquarters in Mascot, New South Wales

Qantas' headquarters are located at the Qantas Centre in the suburb of Mascot, Sydney, New South Wales. In December 2013, a redevelopment of the headquarters was completed.

=== Ownership ===
The Australian Government has an ownership stake in Qantas through Australia's sovereign wealth fund, the Future Fund, and the airline is listed on the Australian Securities Exchange. Under Commonwealth legislation, Qantas must be at least 51% owned by Australian shareholders.

=== Airline subsidiaries ===
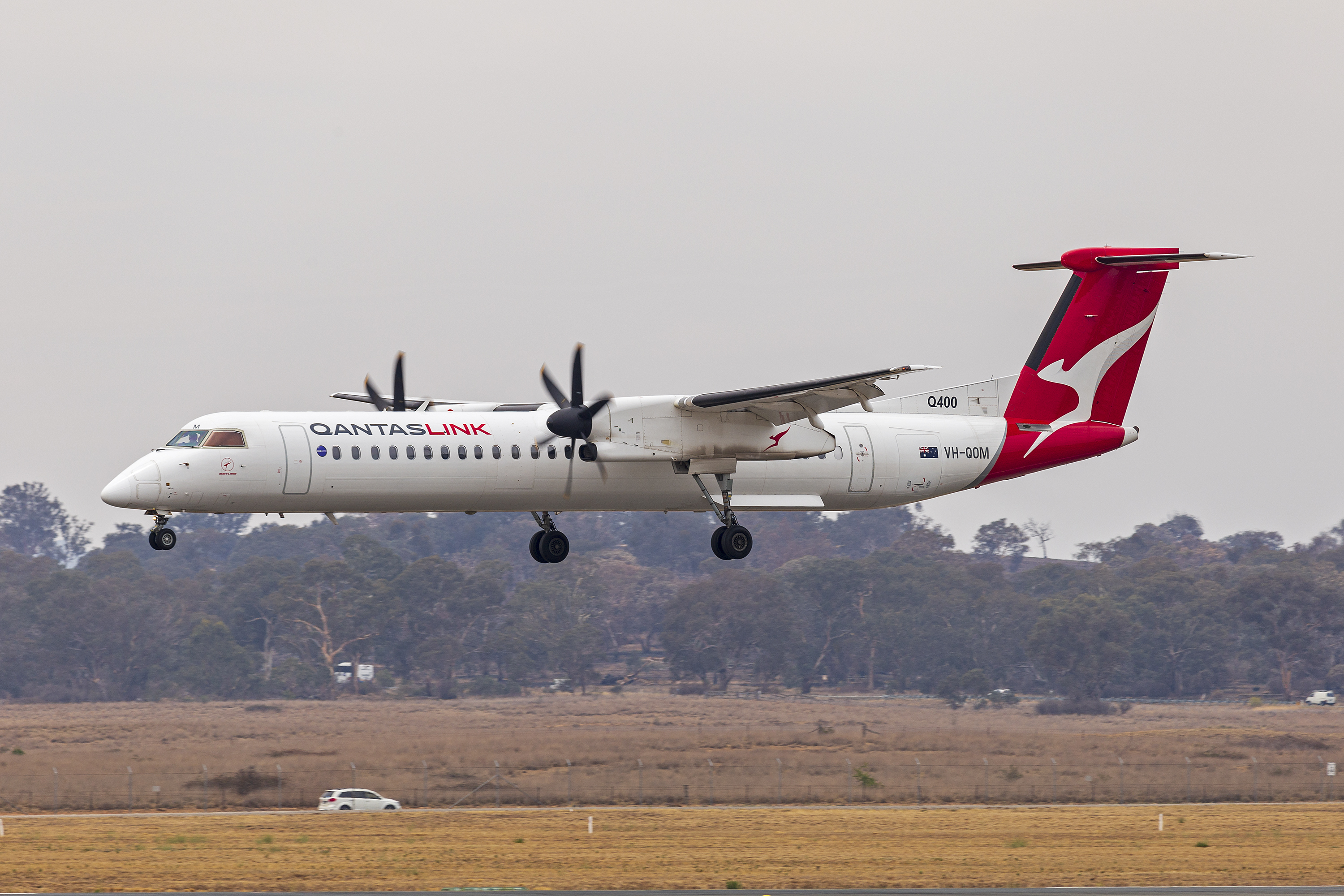
Bombardier Q400, Qantas subsidiary Sunstate Airlines

Qantas has operated a number of passenger airline subsidiaries since inception, including:

Current

- QantasLink – Qantas' regional airline brand encompassing the operations of four Qantas subsidiary airlines (Eastern Australia Airlines, National Jet Systems, Network Aviation and Sunstate Airlines) and a contract carrier
- Jetstar – currently operating as Qantas' low-cost carrier
- Jetconnect – a wholly owned Qantas subsidiary established in 2002 that focused on trans-Tasman travel between New Zealand and Eastern Australia cities (Brisbane, Melbourne, and Sydney). The last of Jetconnect's aircraft were transferred to the mainline fleet in October 2018

Qantas operates a freight service under the name Qantas Freight, which uses aircraft operated by Qantas subsidiary Express Freighters Australia and leases aircraft from Atlas Air. Qantas wholly owns the logistics-and-air-freight company Australian airExpress.

Former

- Australia Asia Airlines – operated from 1990 to 1996 to allow Qantas to serve the Taiwanese market
- Impulse Airlines – an established airline bought by Qantas in 2001. Ceased operations in 2001 and its assets used to establish Jetstar Airways
- Australian Airlines – an international leisure airline that operated from 2002 to 2006, serving leisure destinations in Asia as well as Qantas international routes flown out of Cairns.

=== Minority airline equity interests ===
In addition to its wholly owned subsidiaries, Qantas also owns minority equity stakes in a number of other Australian and foreign airlines:

Airline	Qantas equity stake (%)	Reference
(Australia) Alliance Airlines	20	
Fiji Airways	16	
Jetstar Japan	33	

=== Aboriginal and Torres Strait Islanders initiatives ===
Qantas, through its Aboriginal and Torres Strait Islander Programme, has some links with the Aboriginal Australian community. In the Qantas Reconciliation Action Plan 2015 – 2018, Qantas revealed that 1 percent of all their staff are Aboriginal or Torres Strait Islander. Qantas employs a full-time Diversity Coordinator, who is responsible for the programme.

Qantas has also bought and donated Aboriginal art. An art installation at its passenger lounge in Brisbane features a painting by Jenna Lee. Qantas has had a number of its aircraft painted with the art of Aboriginal artist Emily Kame Kngwarreye and others with art inspired by Rene Kulitja and Paddy Bedford.

=== Promotions and sponsorships ===
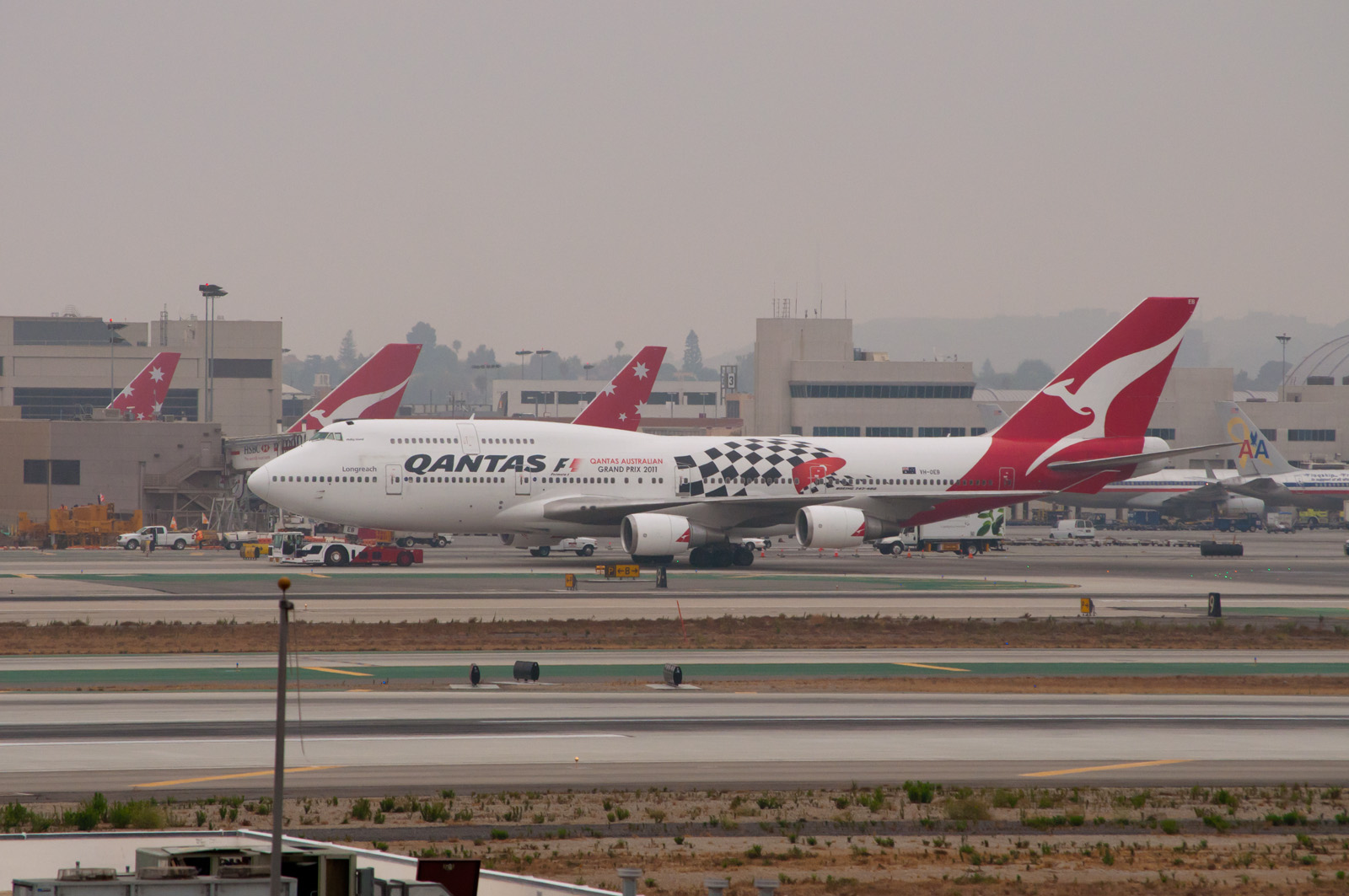
A Qantas Boeing 747-400 in Australian Grand Prix livery at Los Angeles International Airport (LAX), 2011

An early television campaign, starting in 1969 and running for several decades, was aimed at American audiences. It featured a live koala, voiced by Howard Morris, who complained that too many tourists were coming to Australia and concluded "I hate Qantas." The koala ads have been ranked among the greatest commercials of all time. A long-running advertising campaign features renditions by children's choirs of Peter Allen's "I Still Call Australia Home", at various famous landmarks in Australia and foreign locations such as Venice. The song has been used in Qantas's safety videos since 2018.

Qantas was the main sponsor of the Australia national rugby union team. However, in 2020 Qantas ended its sponsorship of the Wallabies after 30 years. Qantas sponsors the Socceroos, Australia's national association football team. Qantas was the naming rights sponsor for the Formula One Australian Grand Prix from 2010 until 2012. In December 2011, Qantas signed a four-year deal with Australian cricket's governing body Cricket Australia, to be the official carrier of the Australia national cricket team.

Qantas management has expressed strong support for Marriage Equality and LGBTIQ issues, with CEO Alan Joyce said to be, "arguably the most prominent corporate voice in the marriage equality campaign". As official airline partner for the Sydney Mardi Gras, Qantas decorated one of its aircraft with rainbow wording and positioned a rainbow flag next to the tail's flying kangaroo. Qantas also served pride cookies to its passengers. It had a rainbow roo float in the Mardi Gras parade.

There has been criticism of Qantas using its corporate power to prosecute the private interests on their staff and the community. Peter Dutton has said that chief executives such as Alan Joyce at Qantas should "stick to their knitting" rather than using the company's brand to advocate for political causes. A senior church leader has made similar comments. Despite the criticism, Qantas will continue to advocate for marriage equality which will include offering customers specially commissioned rings with the phrase, "until we all belong". This phrase will appear on Qantas boarding passes and other paraphernalia. The cost of the campaign by Qantas and other participating companies is expected to be more than $5 million.

Joyce has pledged Qantas will, "continue social-justice campaigning", in relation to Israel Folau, sacked by Rugby Australia, which is financially supported by Qantas, following his social media postings on homosexuality.

=== 2010s structural change ===
In August 2011, the company announced that following financial losses of A$200 million ($209 million) for the year ending June 2011 and a decline in market share, major structural changes would be made. One planned change that did not come to fruition was the plan to create a new Asia-based premium airline that would operate under a different name. In addition to this plan, Qantas announced it planned to cut 1,000 jobs. The reforms included route changes, in particular the cessation of services to London via Hong Kong and Bangkok. While Qantas still operated in these cities, onward flights to London would be via its Oneworld partner British Airways under a code-share service.

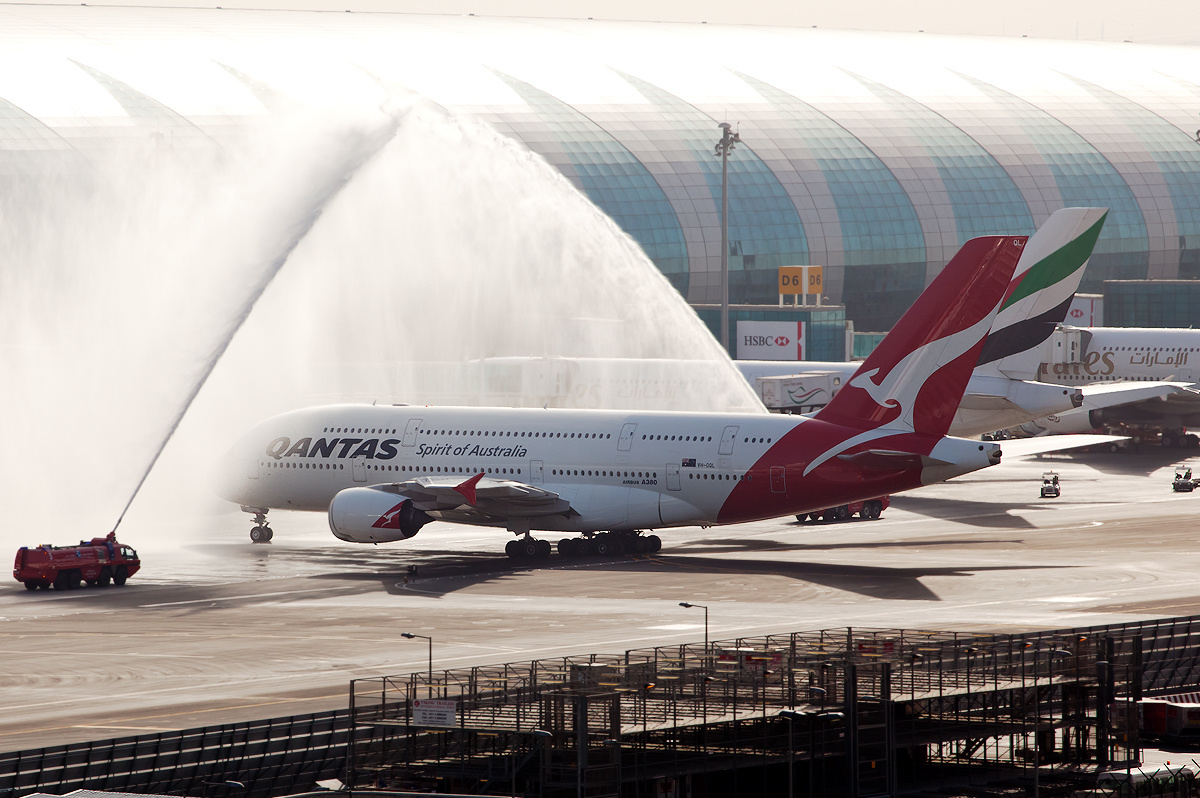
The first daylight arrival of a Qantas Airbus A380 at Dubai International Airport on 1 April 2013

In 2012, Qantas reported an A$245 million full-year loss to the end of June 2012, citing high fuel prices, intense competition and industrial disputes. This was the first full year loss since Qantas was fully privatised 17 years previously, in 1995, and led to the airline cancelling its order of 35 new Boeing 787 aircraft, to reduce its spending. Qantas subsequently divested itself of its 50% holding of StarTrack, Australia's largest road freight company, in part for acquiring full interest in Australian airExpress. In March 2012, Qantas set up Jetstar Hong Kong with China Eastern Airlines Corporation, which was intended to begin flights in 2013, but became embroiled in a protracted approval process.

Qantas and Emirates began an alliance on 31 March 2013, in which their combined carriers offered 98 flights per week to Dubai. In September 2013, the carrier predicted another A$250 million (US$220 million) net loss for the half-year period that ended on 31 December and the implementation of further cost-cutting measures that would see the cut of 1,000 jobs within a year. S&P downgraded Qantas credit from BBB− (the lowest investment grade) to BB+. Moody's applied a similar downgrading a month later.

Losses continued into the 2014 reporting year, with the Qantas Group reporting a half year loss of A$235 million (US$208 million) and an eventual full year loss of A$2.84 billion. In February 2014, additional cost-cutting measures to save A$2 billion, including the loss of 5,000 jobs that will see the workforce lowered from 32,000 to 27,000 by 2017 were announced. In May 2014, the company stated it expected to shed 2,200 jobs by June 2014, including those of 100 pilots. Qantas reduced the size of its fleet by retiring aircraft and deferring deliveries, and planned to sell some of its assets.

With 2,200 employees laid off by June 2014, another 1,800 job positions were planned to be cut by June 2015. Also during 2014, the Qantas Sale Act, under which the airline was privatised, was amended to repeal parts of section 7. That act limits foreign ownership of Qantas to 49 percent, with foreign airlines subject to further restrictions, including a 35-percent limit for all foreign airline shareholdings combined. A single foreign entity can hold no more than 25 percent of the airline's shares.

Qantas returned to profit in 2015, announcing a A$557 million after tax profit in August 2015, in contrast with a A$2.84 billion loss the year earlier. In 2015, Qantas sold its lease of Terminal 3 at Sydney Airport, which was due to continue until 2019, back to Sydney Airport Corporation for $535 million. This meant Sydney Airport resumed operational responsibility of the terminal, including the lucrative retail areas.

=== 2020s structural changes ===
On 10 November 2026, Qantas announced plans to cut 850 corporate jobs in Australia and outsource them to India and other countries from 2027 as part of a deal with tech firm Accenture.

== Accidents and incidents ==
It is often claimed that Qantas has never had an aircraft crash. While it is true that the company has neither lost a jet airliner nor had any jet fatalities, it had eight fatal accidents and an aircraft shot down between 1927 and 1945, with the loss of 63 people. Half of these accidents and the shoot-down occurred during World War II, when the Qantas aircraft were operating on behalf of Allied military forces. Post-war, it lost another four aircraft (one was owned by BOAC and operated by Qantas in a pooling arrangement) with a total of 21 people killed. The last fatal accidents suffered by Qantas were in 1951, with three fatal crashes in five months. Qantas' safety record allows the airline to be officially known as the world's safest airline for seven years in a row from 2012 until 2019 and again in 2021 and 2023.

Since the end of World War II, the following accidents and incidents have occurred:

- On 23 March 1946, an Avro Lancastrian registered G-AGLX disappeared while flying over the Indian Ocean. The BOAC-owned aircraft was being operated by Qantas on the Karachi—Sydney part of the two airlines' joint service from London to Sydney. It disappeared with seven passengers and crew on board between Colombo, Ceylon (now Sri Lanka), and the Cocos (Keeling) Islands, approximately three hours before it was due to arrive at the Cocos islands.
- On 7 April 1949, an Avro Lancastrian registered VH-EAS swung on landing at Dubbo, New South Wales during a training flight, causing the gear to collapse. The aircraft was destroyed by fire, but the crew evacuated safely.
- On 16 July 1951, a de Havilland Australia DHA-3 Drover registered VH-EBQ crashed off the coast of New Guinea (in the Huon Gulf near the mouth of the Markham River) after the centre engine's propeller failed. The pilot and the six passengers on board were killed.
- On 21 September 1951, a de Havilland DH.84 Dragon registered VH-AXL, crashed in mountainous country southeast of Arona in the central highlands of New Guinea, no passengers were on board, the pilot was killed.
- On 13 December 1951, a de Havilland DH.84 Dragon registered VH-URV crashed in mountainous country near Mount Hagen, central highlands of New Guinea. The pilot and the two passengers were killed. This is the last fatal accident suffered by Qantas.
- On 24 August 1960, a Lockheed L-1049 Super Constellation registered VH-EAC crashed on take-off at Mauritius en route to the Cocos Islands, Australia. The take-off was aborted following an engine failure, the aircraft ran off the runway, and was destroyed by fire. There were no fatalities.
- On 1 June 1989, Qantas Flight 5, a Boeing 747-200 operating from Sydney to Singapore was cruising at 32,000 ft about 900 km south-east of Derby when it sharply climbed 1500 ft. The pilots disengaged the auto-pilot and the aircraft sharply descended 1500 ft. Unrestrained passengers hit the cabin's internal ceiling panels, leaving holes. The aircraft diverted to Darwin, where 47 passengers were taken to hospital with cuts, bruises, chest pains, concussion, fractured ribs and shock. Three passengers suffered spinal injuries.
- On 23 September 1999, Qantas Flight 1, a Boeing 747-400 registered VH-OJH, overran the runway while landing at Bangkok, Thailand, during a heavy thunderstorm. The aircraft came to a stop on a golf course, but without fatalities. The Australian Transport Safety Bureau criticised numerous inadequacies in Qantas' operational and training processes.
- On 25 July 2008, Qantas Flight 30, a Boeing 747-400 registered VH-OJK, suffered a ruptured fuselage and decompression as a result of an oxygen tank explosion over the South China Sea. En route from Hong Kong International Airport to Melbourne Airport, the aircraft made an emergency landing in the Philippines with no injuries.
- On 7 October 2008, an Airbus A330-300 registered VH-QPA, travelling from Singapore Changi Airport to Perth, Western Australia as Qantas Flight 72, suffered a rapid loss of altitude in two sudden uncommanded pitch down manoeuvres causing serious injuries while 80 nautical miles (150 km; 92 mi) from Learmonth. The aircraft safely landed in Learmonth, with 14 people requiring transportation by air ambulance to Perth. Another 30 people also required hospital treatment, while an additional 30 people had injuries not requiring hospital treatment. Initial investigations identified an inertial reference system fault in the Number-1 Air Data Inertial Reference Unit as the likely origin of the event. On receiving false indication of a very high angle of attack, the flight control systems commanded a pitch down movement, reaching a maximum of 8.5 degrees pitch down. The incident featured in a 7 News documentary.
- On 4 November 2010, Qantas Flight 32, an Airbus A380 registered VH-OQA, fitted with four Rolls-Royce Trent 972 engines, suffered an uncontained turbine disc failure of its left inboard engine shortly after taking off from Singapore Changi Airport en route to Sydney. The aircraft returned to Singapore and landed safely. None of the 440 passengers or 29 crew on board were injured.
- On 8 November 2024, Qantas Flight 520, a Boeing 737-800 registered VH-VYH, suffered a contained failure of its right engine at decision speed during take-off from Sydney for Brisbane. The crew continued the take-off and returned for a single-engine landing about 30 minutes later; none of the 181 occupants was injured. The ATSB found that a fatigue crack in a high-pressure turbine blade caused the failure and classified the occurrence as a serious incident.

=== Extortion attempts ===
On 26 May 1971, Qantas received a call from a "Mr. Brown" claiming that there was a bomb planted on a Hong Kong-bound jet and demanding $500,000 in unmarked $20 notes. The caller and threat were taken seriously when he directed police to an airport locker where a functional bomb was found. Arrangements were made to pick up the money in front of the head office of the airline in the heart of the Sydney business district. Qantas paid the money and it was collected, after which Mr. Brown called again, advising the "bomb on the plane" story was a hoax. The initial pursuit of the perpetrator was bungled by the New South Wales Police Force which, despite having been advised of the matter from the time of the first call, failed to establish adequate surveillance of the pick-up of the money. Directed not to use their radios (for fear of being "overheard"), the police were unable to communicate adequately.

Tipped off by a still-unidentified informer, the police arrested an Englishman, Peter Macari, finding more than $138,000 hidden in an Annandale property. Convicted and sentenced to 15 years in prison, Macari served nine years before being deported to Britain. More than $224,000 remains unaccounted for. The 1986 telemovie Call Me Mr. Brown, directed by Scott Hicks and produced by Terry Jennings, relates to this incident. On 4 July 1997 a copycat extortion attempt was thwarted by police and Qantas security staff.

== Controversies ==
=== Sex discrimination controversy ===
In November 2005, it was revealed that Qantas had a policy of not seating adult male passengers next to unaccompanied children. This led to accusations of discrimination. The policy came to light following an incident in 2004 when Mark Wolsay, who was seated next to a young boy on a Qantas flight in New Zealand, was asked to change seats with a female passenger. A steward informed him that "it was the airline's policy that only women were allowed to sit next to unaccompanied children". Cameron Murphy of the NSW Council for Civil Liberties president criticised the policy and stated that "there was no basis for the ban". He said it was wrong to assume that all adult males posed a danger to children. The policy has also been criticised for failing to take female abusers into consideration.

In 2010, when British Airways was successfully sued to change its child seating policy, Qantas argued again that banning men from sitting next to unaccompanied children "reflected parents' concerns". In August 2012, the controversy resurfaced when a male passenger had to swap seats with a female passenger after the crew noticed he was sitting next to an unrelated girl travelling alone. The man felt discriminated against and humiliated before the other passengers as a possible paedophile. A Qantas spokesman defended the policy as consistent with that of other airlines in Australia and around the globe.

=== Price fixing ===
In November 2007, Qantas pleaded guilty and agreed to pay a US$61 million fine in the United States for its role in a conspiracy to fix rates for international air cargo shipments between January 2000 and February 2006. Former senior Qantas executive Bruce McCaffrey was sentenced to 6 months in jail and a $US20,000 fine over his role in the price-fixing. In February 2011, Qantas reached a settlement over a class action lawsuit filed in the United States, agreeing to pay US$26.5 million. In August 2014, Deutsche Bahn filed a lawsuit against Qantas and seven other airlines for price-fixing in a New York court in a US$2.5 billion lawsuit, however, it dropped the lawsuit without explanation in March 2015.

In October 2008, the Australian Competition & Consumer Commission (ACCC) launched proceedings in federal court over alleged price fixing relating to fuel surcharges applied to international carriage of air cargo between 2002 and 2006. In December 2008, the court ordered Qantas pay A$20 million in penalties for breaching provisions of the Trade Practices Act 1974 and to pay $200,000 towards the ACCC.

In July 2009, the Canadian Competition Bureau fined Qantas CAD$155,000 after it admitted that its freight division fixed surcharges on cargo exported on certain routes from Canada between May 2002 and February 2006.

In June 2010, the South Korean Fair Trade Commission fined Qantas ₩131 million alongside 18 other airlines for fixing cargo prices between 1999 and 2007.

In November 2010, Qantas was fined €8.9 million by the European Commissioner for Competition along with ten other airlines for fixing air cargo prices.

In April 2011, Qantas was fined NZ$6.5 million in April 2011 when it pleaded guilty in the New Zealand High Court to the cartel operation.

=== Industrial disputes and 2011 grounding of fleet ===
In response to ongoing industrial unrest over failed negotiations involving three unions (the Australian Licensed Aircraft Engineers Association (ALAEA), the Australian and International Pilots Association (AIPA) and the Transport Workers Union of Australia (TWU)), the company grounded its entire domestic and international fleet from 5 pm AEDT on 29 October 2011, and employees involved would be locked out from 8 p.m. AEDT on 31 October 2011. However, in the early hours of 31 October, Fair Work Australia ordered that all industrial action taken by Qantas and the involved trade unions be terminated immediately. The order was requested by the federal government amid fears that an extended period of grounding would do significant damage to the national economy, especially the tourism and mining sectors. It was reported that the grounding would have had a daily financial impact of A$20 million and affected an estimated 68,000 customers worldwide.

In 2021, the Transport Workers Union took Qantas to court, over the dismissal of 1,685 baggage handlers and cleaners during the COVID-19 pandemic, whose roles were later outsourced. The TWU argued that the airline's actions contravened the Fair Work Act while Qantas claimed it had to make the cuts to ensure the company's survival during the pandemic. In July 2021, the Federal Court of Australia ruled in favour of the TWU. Qantas lost an appeal in May 2022. The case moved to the High Court of Australia in May 2023, and in September 2023, the High Court ruled against Qantas, upholding the original Federal Court decision and leaving the airline liable for compensation. After the verdict, Qantas issued an apology to the sacked workers.

In December 2024, Qantas announced it would pay A$120 million in compensation to former ground handlers who were sacked. In August 2025, Qantas was ordered to pay an additional A$90 million penalty, of which A$50 million would be paid to the Transport Workers Union.

=== Asylum seeker deportations ===
Qantas has been subject to protests in relation to the deportation of asylum seekers, which led to disruptions of flights. In February 2015, activists prevented the transfer of a Tamil man from Melbourne to Darwin (from where he was to be deported to Colombo) by refusing to take their seats on a Qantas flight. It was reported that Qantas banned the student from taking Qantas flights in the future. A nameless head of security from Qantas sent a letter to the Melbourne student's email account saying her "actions are unacceptable and will not be tolerated by the Qantas Group or the Jetstar Group".

In March 2015, another Tamil man was to be sent from Melbourne to Darwin to later be deported. A protest by the man led to him not being put on the aircraft. A spokesman for Qantas said flight QF838 was delayed almost two hours. A spokesperson from Qantas stated that "[s]afety and security is the number-one priority for all airlines and an aircraft is not the right place for people to conduct protests."

In March 2017, campaigners asked Qantas to rule out deporting Iraqi man Saeed in 2017.

In March 2018, campaigners asked Qantas not to participate in the high-profile deportation case of the Nadesalingam family. In response a Qantas spokesperson stated: "We appreciate that this is a sensitive issue. The government and courts are best placed to make decisions on complex immigration matters, not airlines".

=== Disputes with airports ===
In September 2010, Qantas breached Wellington Airport's late night curfew when a flight from Sydney had arrived at 1:47am NZDT, 17 minutes past a 30-minute grace period for disrupted flights. In August 2011, it paid a $12,000 fine for the breach.

The airline has been in a number of disputes with the operators of Perth Airport. In 2018, the airport sued Qantas in the Supreme Court of Western Australia for allegedly underpaying their aeronautical service fees by A$11.3 million. The suit was resolved in 2022 with Qantas forced to pay the airport the owed amount plus an additional A$9 million. In 2020, Perth Airport had also threatened to cancel several of the airline's leases over unpaid rent between February and May 2020; part of the rental dispute concerned Qantas alleging that Perth Airport had undervalued a Qantas-owned terminal that was sold back to the airport. Qantas had also drawn criticism from both Perth Airport and the Government of Western Australia for delaying an agreed move from their existing isolated terminals to a proposed new terminal in the airport's central precinct; in May 2024, it was confirmed that the airline had come to an agreement to complete the move by 2031, six years after the original agreed timeframe of 2025.

=== Complaints ===
==== Flight credit policy ====
In April 2022, consumer advocacy group Choice lodged a complaint with the Australian Competition & Consumer Commission (ACCC) concerning the airline's flight credit policy for cancelled flights during the COVID-19 pandemic, which they alleged was "unfair" and saw customers issued with flight vouchers with short expiration dates that became unusable due to ongoing travel restrictions. During an August 2023 Australian Senate committee hearing concerning the rising cost of living, CEO Alan Joyce was accused of "misleading the Australian public" with the airline's flight credits scheme, among other issues with the carrier. On 31 August 2023, Qantas bowed to public pressure and announced the removal of expiry dates for flight credits issued up to 30 September 2021 as well as giving customers the option of a refund instead, with Joyce admitting in a statement that the airline's implementation of the scheme led to "people [losing] faith in the process".

Although more than A$1 billion in credit had been claimed by Qantas and Jetstar customers by August 2023, Echo Law filed a class action lawsuit for customers still seeking refunds and compensation for flights cancelled during the pandemic. In March 2026, Qantas agreed to settle the class action lawsuit without admitting wrongdoing for $105 million, with Qantas distributing $68 million to customers who received a travel credit rather than a refund for flights cancelled during the pandemic.

==== Cancelled flights ====
In August 2023, the Australian Competition and Consumer Commission commenced court action against Qantas for offering and selling tickets on 82,000 flights due to take off between May 2022 and May 2024 that it had already decided to cancel. Of those flights, nearly 87,000 customers had already made bookings on cancelled flights and nearly 884,000 customers were not informed that their flight had already been cancelled. These allegations led to the premature departure of Chief Executive Officer Alan Joyce in 2023. In May 2024, Qantas settled the lawsuit, agreeing to pay A$100 million in penalties and about A$20 million in compensation to consumers who had purchased flights that Qantas had already cancelled. Consumers were entitled to $225 for domestic and trans-Tasman flights, and $450 for international flights, on top of any other refund or alternative flight already offered.

==== Other consumer complaints ====
In September 2022, Four Corners broadcast an episode titled "The Inside Story Of the Chaos at Qantas", detailing passenger service issues and cost cutting by the company.

In March 2023, a report by the ACCC found that the airline was the subject of almost 2,000 complaints over the previous year, with more than 1,300 complaints relating to flight cancellations. The report found that complaints about the airline had risen by 70% from the previous year, and that the ACCC receives more complaints about Qantas than any other business.

=== Data breaches ===
In May 2024, a caching issue allowed users to view the personal details of other travellers on its app, which included boarding passes, flight information and frequent flyer information of other passengers.

In July 2025, Qantas confirmed that a cyber incident had occurred at one of its contact centres that resulted in cybercrime collective Scattered Lapsus$Hunters taking 5.7 million customer service records. This included customers' names, email addresses, phone numbers, date of birth and frequent flyer numbers. In October 2025, the data was leaked on the dark web after a ransom deadline had passed. Legal firm Maurice Blackburn filed a class action lawsuit against Qantas following the data breach.

== See also ==
- The Double Sunrise
- Qantas Founders Museum
- Qantas House
- Qantassaurus, a dinosaur named after the airline
- Southern Cross Route
- Wallaby Route

General:

- List of airlines of Australia
- List of oldest companies in Australia
- Transport in Australia

== Bibliography ==
- Bennet-Bremner, E. (1945). Front-line airline-Air transport during the South-West Pacific War 1939–1944. London: Paul Elek (Publishers) Ltd.
- Brogden, S. (1960). The history of Australian aviation. Melbourne: The Hawthorn Press.
- Wigton, D.C. (1963). from Jenny to jet. Los Angeles (CA): Floyd Clymer Publications.
- Fysh, H. (1997). QANTAS at war. Sydney: Angus & Robertson.
- Fysh, H. (1970). Wings to the world (QANTAS 1945–1966). Sydney: Angus & Robertson.
- Gunn, J. (1990). Challenging horizons-QANTAS 1939–1954. St. Lucia: University of Queensland Press.
- Gunn, J. (1988). High corridors-QANTAS 1954–1970. St. Lucia: University of Queensland Press.
- Montagnana-Wallace, Neil (2021). The flying kangaroo: 100 years of Qantas. Preston (Victoria): Bounce Books. ISBN 978-1-922419-39-2. OCLC 1258150569.
