= History of Qantas =

Qantas is Australia's largest airline. Qantas was founded in Winton, Queensland, on 16 November 1920 as Queensland and Northern Territory Aerial Services Limited by Paul McGinness, Sir Hudson Fysh and Sir Fergus McMaster, the latter of whom was chairman. Arthur Baird was employed as a chief aircraft engineer. McGinness left QANTAS for other interests, and Hudson Fysh remained with the company as General Manager & Managing Director. He retired as Sir Hudson Fysh KBE DFC, Chairman of Qantas in 1966.

Initially, the airline operated taxi and joy flights, as well as airmail services subsidised by the Australian government, linking railheads in western Queensland. Between 1926 and 1928 Qantas built several aircraft in Longreach and made the inaugural flight of the Royal Flying Doctor Service, departing from Cloncurry. Qantas Empire Airways Limited (QEA) was formed by Qantas and Britain's Imperial Airways in 1934. They flew internationally from May 1935, when the service from Darwin was extended to Singapore. As operations expanded with flying boat services, World War II disrupted air travel until 1943. In 1947, QEA was nationalised, with the Australian Labor government buying the shares. In the same year, the airline took delivery of Lockheed L-749 Constellations and these took over the trunk route to London. In 1958, Qantas became the second round-the-world airline, flying Super Constellations westward from Australia to London through Asia and the Middle East.

In 1956, Qantas ordered the Boeing 707 jet airliner, and the first was delivered in June 1959. The first jet service operated by Qantas was on 29 July 1959 from Sydney to San Francisco via Nadi and Honolulu. On 5 September 1959 Qantas became the third airline to fly jets across the North Atlantic. In 1966, the airline diversified its business by opening the 450-room Wentworth Hotel in Sydney. In 1967, the airline placed orders for the Boeing 747, and Qantas Empire Airways changed its name to Qantas Airways. When Cyclone Tracy devastated the town of Darwin at Christmas 1974, Qantas established a world record for the most people ever embarked on a single aircraft when it evacuated 673 people on a single Boeing 747 flight. In March 1979, Qantas operated its final Boeing 707 flight from Auckland to Sydney, and until the delivery of the first Boeing 767 in 1985 became the only national airline in the world to have a fleet consisting of a single aircraft type.

The Boeing 747 fleet was upgraded from 1989 with the arrival of the new Boeing 747-400 series. The delivery flight of the first 747-400 was a world record for commercial aircraft, flying the 18,001 km (11,185 mi) from London to Sydney non-stop. The Australian Government sold the domestic carrier Australian Airlines to Qantas in August 1992. This provided Qantas access to the Australian domestic market for the first time in its history. Qantas was privatised in two stages, first by a sale of 25% to British Airways in 1993 and the remaining 75% by public float in mid-1995. Qantas ordered twelve Airbus A380-800s in 2000 and was soon the third airline to receive A380s, after Singapore Airlines and Emirates. The airline created a new cut-price subsidiary airline, Jetstar after Virgin Blue expanded in October 2001. On 13 December 2004, the first flight of Jetstar Asia took off from its Singapore hub to Hong Kong, marking Qantas' entry into the Asian cut-price market.

Before 29 October 2011, Qantas operated a significant number of international flights into and out of Singapore Changi, Auckland Airport, Brisbane Airport, Los Angeles International and London Heathrow airports. Qantas has been one of the most profitable airlines in the world. In 2008, the first Qantas Airbus A380 was handed over by Airbus at a ceremony on 19 September. The first route for the A380 was Melbourne to Los Angeles.

== History ==
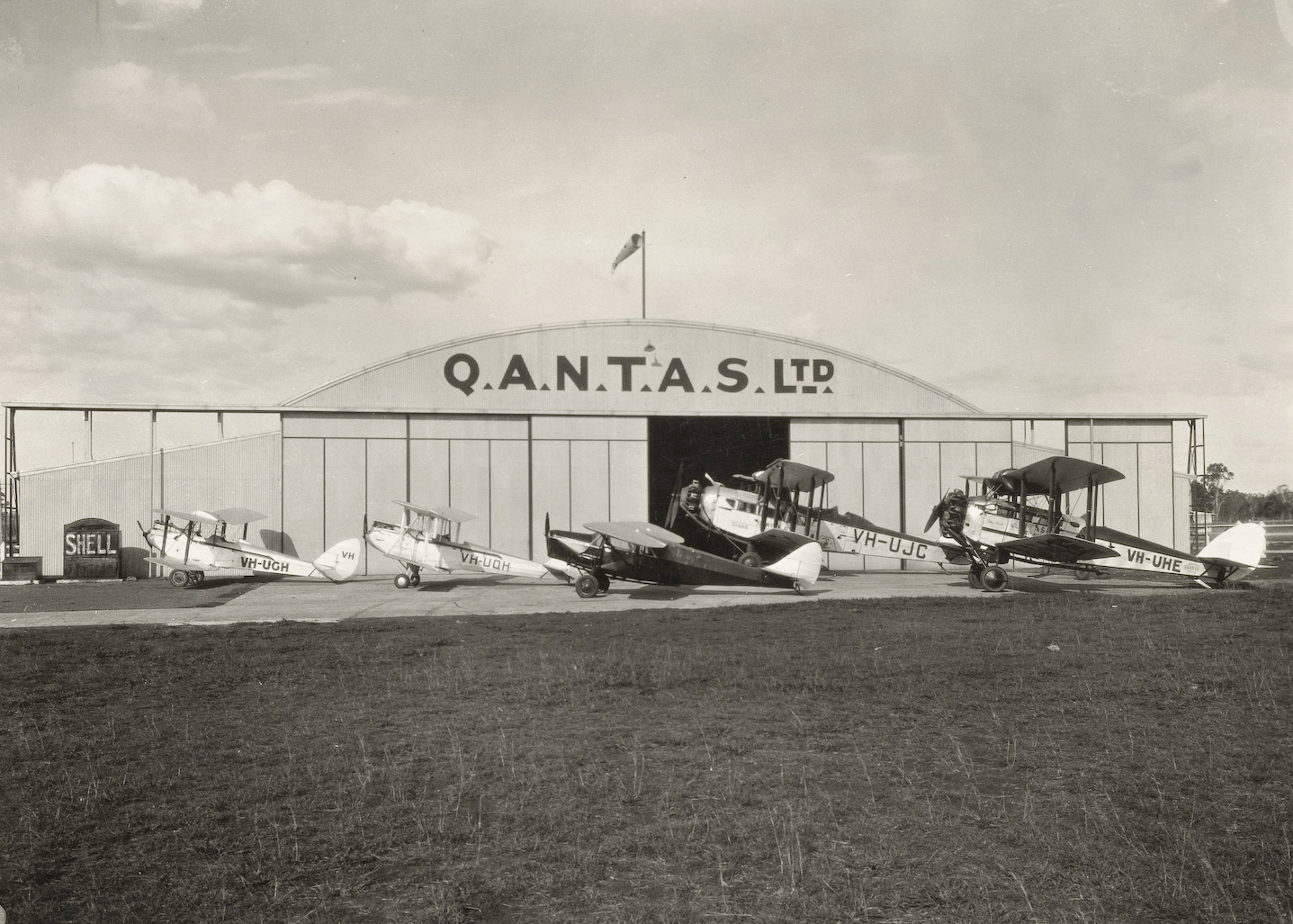
Portion of Qantas fleet, Archerfield, Brisbane, Queensland, c. 1930

=== Beginnings: 1920 to 1934 ===
Qantas was founded in Winton, Queensland on 16 November 1920 as Queensland and Northern Territory Aerial Services Limited by Paul McGinness and Hudson Fysh. Fergus McMaster joined them as chairman, as did Arthur Baird to take care of aircraft maintenance. McGinness left QANTAS for other interests in 1922, and Hudson Fysh remained with the company as General Manager & Managing Director. He retired as Sir Hudson Fysh KBE DFC, Chairman of QANTAS in 1966.

The airline's first aircraft was an Avro 504K purchased for £1425. The aircraft had a cruising speed of 105 kilometres per hour (65 mph) and carried one pilot and two passengers. On 2 November 1922, eighty-four-year-old outback pioneer Alexander Kennedy became the first passenger on the first scheduled service (piloted by Hudson Fysh) receiving ticket number one for a flight from Longreach to Cloncurry. The airline operated air mail services subsidised by the Australian government, linking railheads in western Queensland.

Between 1926 and 1928, Qantas built seven de Havilland DH.50s and a single DH.9 under licence in its Longreach hangar. In 1928 a chartered Qantas aircraft made the inaugural flight of the Royal Flying Doctor Service, departing from Cloncurry.

=== Flying boats and war: 1934 to 1945 ===
Revenue Passenger Kilometers, scheduled flights only, in millions
Year	Traffic
1950	142
1955	434
1960	1124
1965	2471
1971	4208
1975	10142
1980	15769
1985	17304
1995	51870
2000	63495

In 1934, QANTAS Limited and Britain's Imperial Airways (a forerunner of British Airways) formed a new company, Qantas Empire Airways Limited (QEA). Each partner held 49%, with two per cent in the hands of an independent arbitrator. The new airline commenced operations in December 1934 flying between Brisbane and Darwin using obsolescent DH.50 and de Havilland DH.61 biplanes.

QEA flew internationally from May 1935, when the service from Darwin was extended to Singapore using newer de Havilland DH.86s. Imperial Airways operated the rest of the service through to London. In July 1938 this operation was replaced by a thrice-weekly flying boat service using Short S.23 Empire flying boats. The Sydney to Southampton service took nine days, with passengers staying in hotels overnight. For the single year of peace that the service operated, it was profitable and 94% of services were on time. After Italy entered the war in June 1940, this became the Horseshoe Route between Sydney and Durban in South Africa with South Africa – UK stage being by the sea. This service was a vital line of communication between Australia and the United Kingdom and lasted until Singapore fell in February 1942. Enemy action and accidents destroyed half of the fleet of ten when most of the fleet was taken over by the Australian government for war service.

Flying boat services were resumed with American-built Consolidated PBY Catalinas on 10 July 1943, with flights between Swan River, Perth and Koggala lake in Ceylon (now Sri Lanka) in a service that was named "The Double Sunrise". This linked up with the British Overseas Airways Corporation (BOAC, the successor airline to Imperial Airways) service to London, maintaining the vital communications link with England. The 5,652 km non-stop sector was the longest flown up to that time by any airline, with an average flying time of 28 hours. Passengers received a certificate of membership to The Rare and Secret Order of the Double Sunrise as the sun rose twice during the westbound portion of the route.

In 1944 the Catalinas were augmented by conventional Consolidated B-24 Liberators, flying from Ratmalana via RAF Minneriya for refueling and then across the ocean to Learmonth. Later, Avro Lancastrians were flown on the route. They flew from Sydney to Gawler, stopping in Adelaide for refuelling, and on to Learmonth for the overnight stage. On the next leg of the trip, they flew to Ratmalana, where the aircraft refuelled, then on to Karachi, where BOAC crews took over for the final segment of the journey to the UK. The lengthening of the runway at Ratmalana enabled the diversion to Minneria to be eliminated, and soon Ratmalana was replaced by RAF Negombo. The service was renamed the Kangaroo Service and the passenger award became The Order of the Longest Hop. It was on this route that the Kangaroo logo was first used. After the war, the return trip could also go from Colombo to Cocos Islands, then to Perth on to Sydney. These flights continued until 5 April 1946.

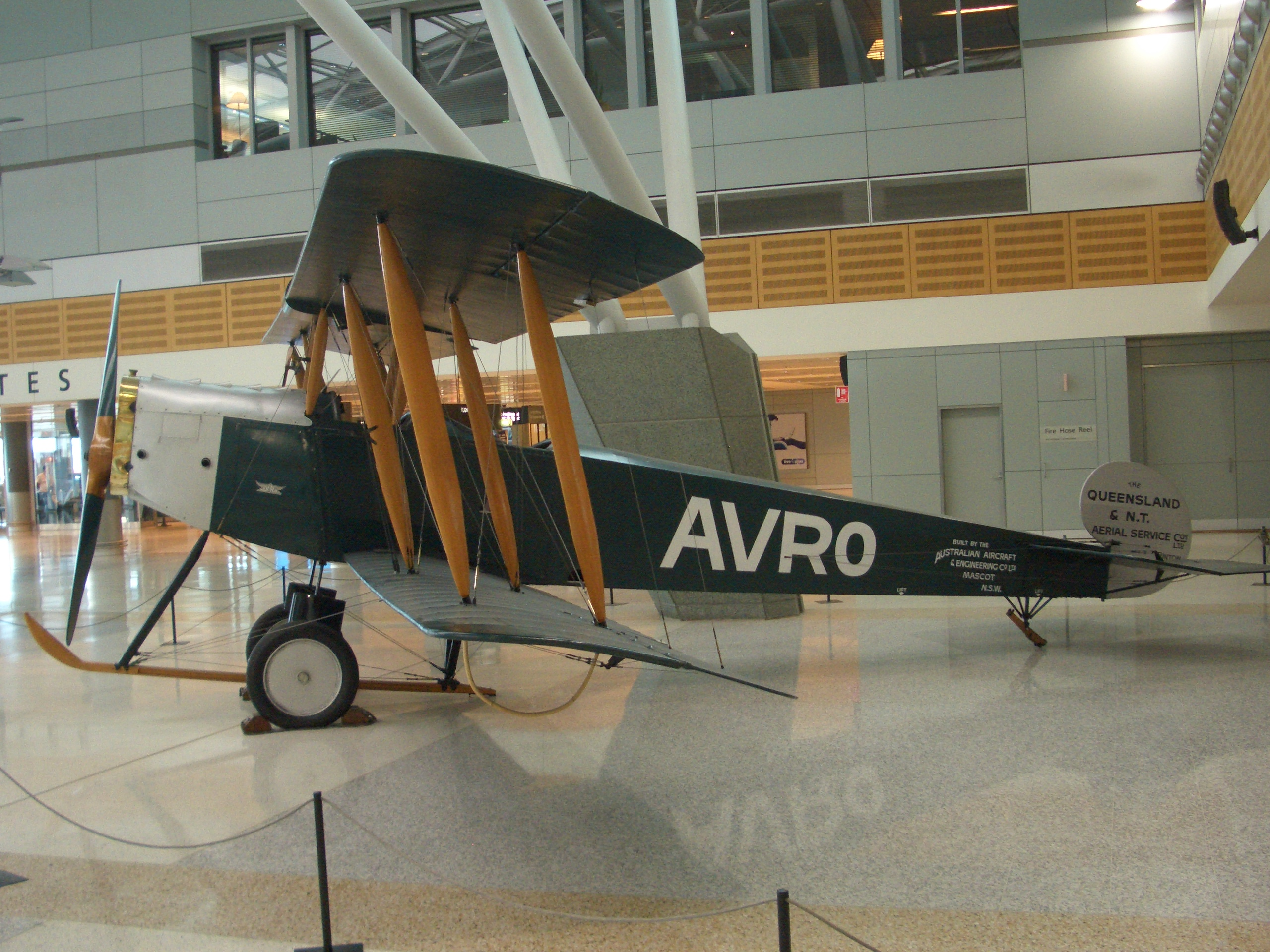
Avro 504K replica on display in Qantas' Sydney Airport domestic terminal

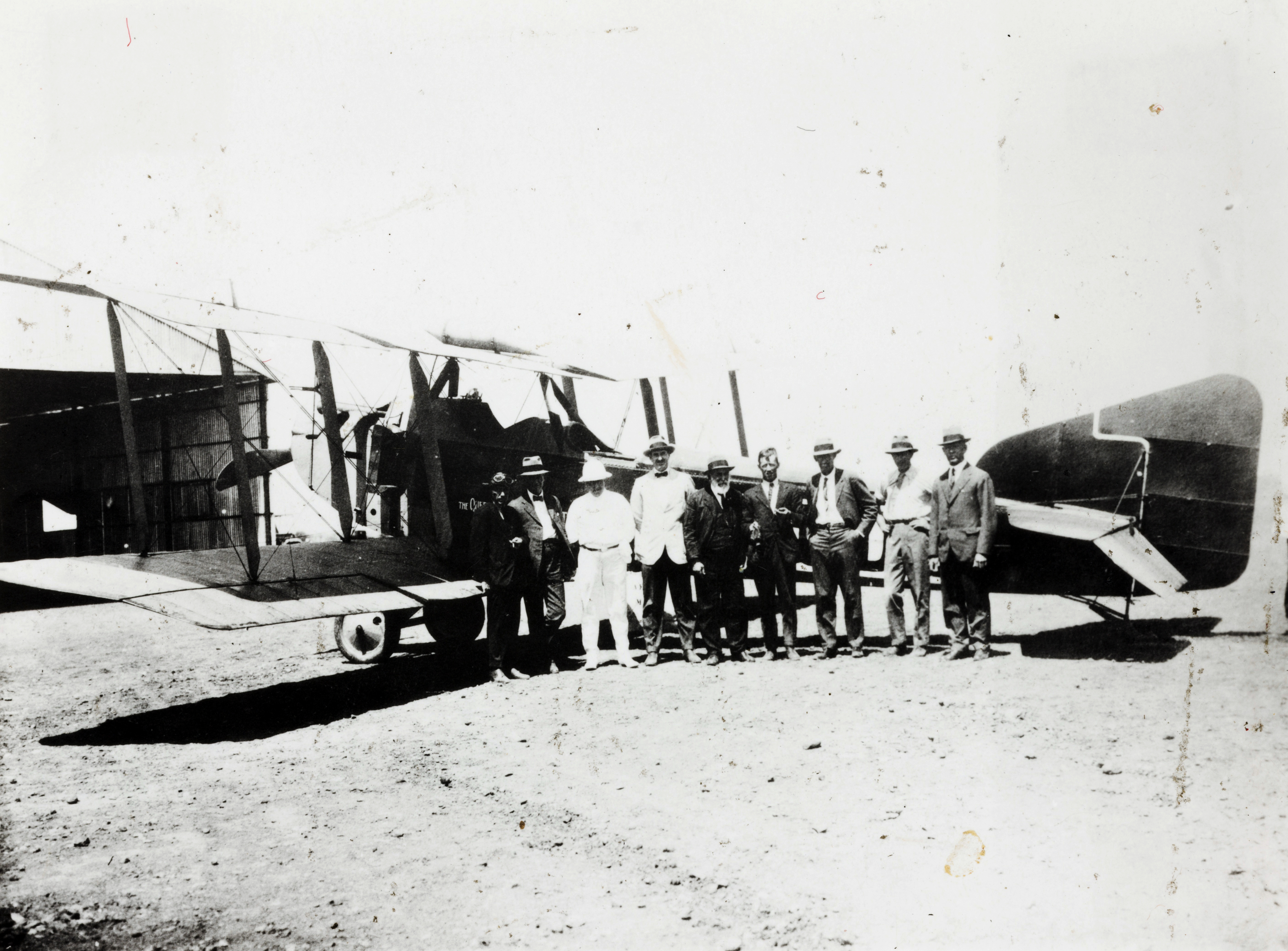
Arrival at Longreach of the Armstrong Whitworth FK8 with the first bag of airmail on the inaugural flight of the first Qantas air service from Charleville to Cloncurry, 22 November 1922

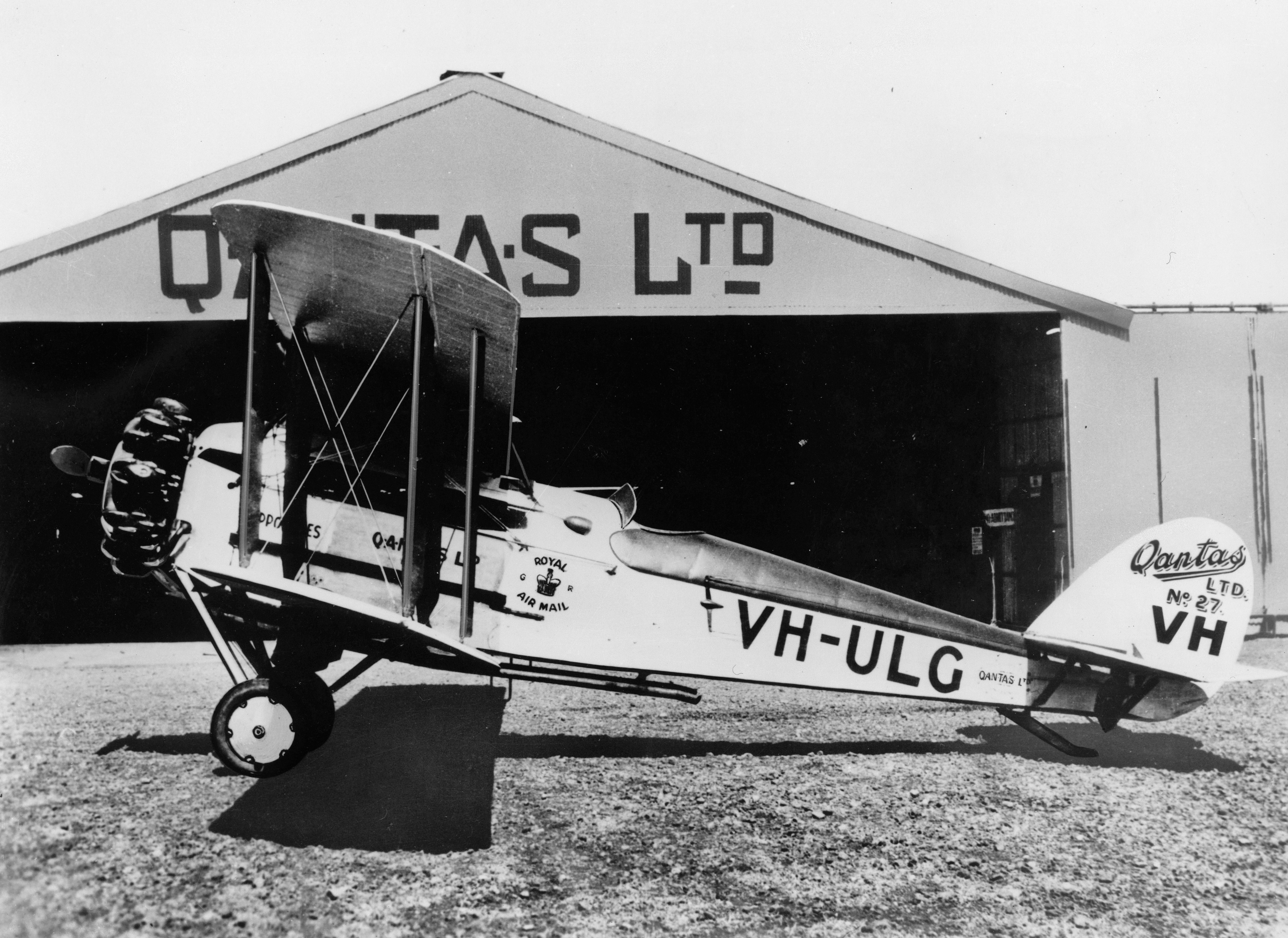
Qantas-manufactured de Havilland DH.50J, circa 1928

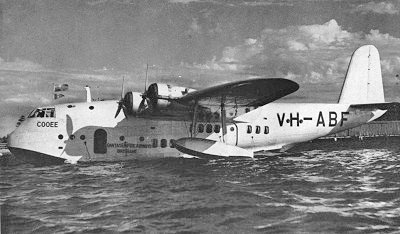
Qantas Short S.23 Empire flying boat

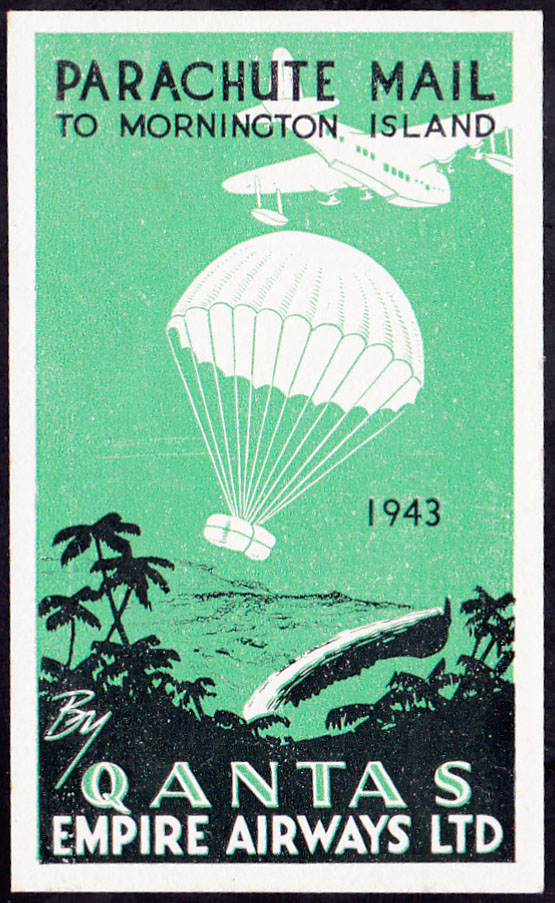
A vignette for affixing to mail for the 1943 Christmas parachute drop to Mornington Island Mission

=== The post-war years: 1945 to 1959 ===
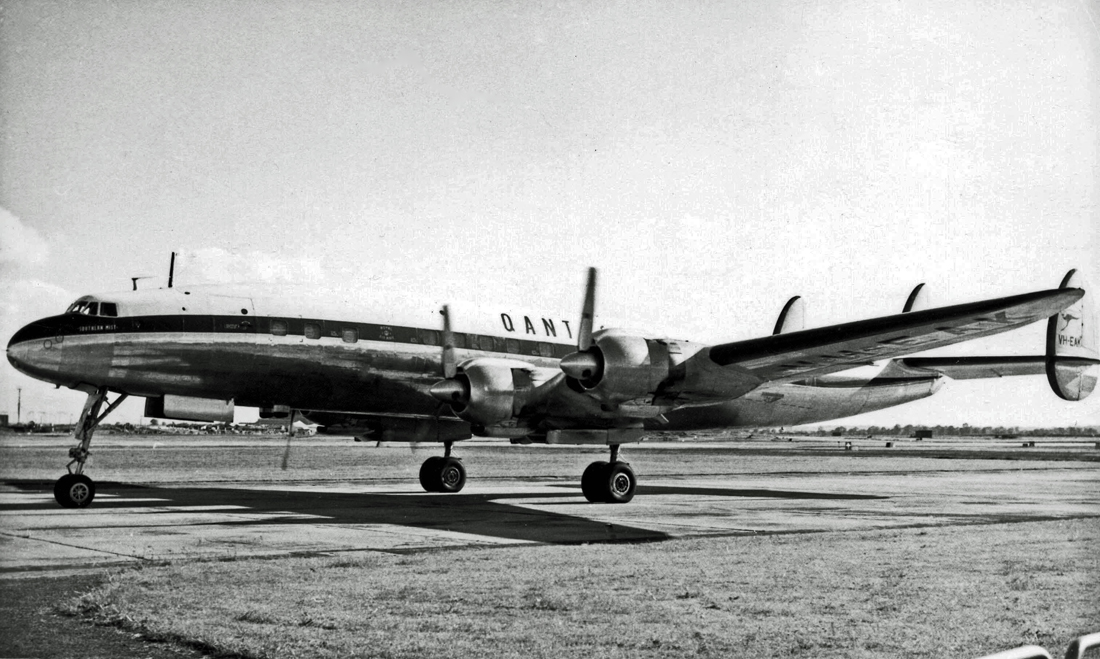
Qantas Super Constellation arriving at London Heathrow from Sydney in 1955

In 1947, QEA was nationalised, with the Australian Labor government led by Prime Minister Ben Chifley buying the shares owned by BOAC, followed by those of QANTAS Limited. Nationalised airlines were normal at the time, and the Qantas board encouraged this move. After the completion of the buyout, QANTAS Limited was wound up and liquidated to shareholders.

Shortly after nationalisation, QEA began its first services outside the British Empire-to Tokyo via Darwin and Manila with Avro Lancastrian aircraft. These aircraft were also deployed between Sydney and London in co-operation with BOAC, but were soon replaced by Douglas DC-4s. Services to Hong Kong began in 1949 as well.

In 1947 the airline took delivery of Lockheed L-749 Constellations and these took over the trunk route to London. Flying boats again entered the fleet from 1950, when the first of five Short Sandringham aircraft entered service for flights between the Rose Bay flying boat base on Sydney Harbour and destinations in New Caledonia, New Hebrides, Fiji, New Guinea (dubbed the "Bird of Paradise" route) and Lord Howe Island.

In 1952 Qantas expanded services across the Indian Ocean to Johannesburg via Melbourne, Perth, the Cocos Islands, Réunion and Mauritius, calling this the Wallaby Route. Around this time, the British Government pressured Qantas to purchase the de Havilland Comet jet airliner, but Hudson Fysh was dubious about the economics of the aircraft and successfully resisted this. The network expanded across the Pacific to Vancouver via Auckland, Nadi, Honolulu and San Francisco in early 1954 when it took over the Southern Cross Route of British Commonwealth Pacific Airlines (BCPA). The first of the airline's Lockheed 1049 Super Constellations was delivered in early 1954.

In January 1958 Qantas became the second round-the-world airline, flying Super Constellations west from Australia to London through Asia and the Middle East on the Kangaroo route, and east to London on the Southern Cross route. At their inaugural flight on 14 January, Super Constellation VH-EAO flew eastbound, while its counterpart VH-EAP flew westbound. They both reached London and then returned in Sydney on 20 January. Later, a Lockheed Electra aircraft inaugurated flights to New Zealand in 1961.

In September 1956 Qantas ordered the Boeing 707-138 jet airliner and the first was delivered in June 1959. This order made the airline the first customer for the type outside the US. The special shortened version for Qantas was the original version Boeing offered to airlines. Boeing lengthened the aircraft by ten feet for all other customers, which destroyed the economics for Qantas Pacific routes. The airline successfully negotiated with Boeing to have the aircraft for which it had originally contracted. This order was later followed up by another purchase by Qantas of the same variant. In March 1960 the airline ordered six of the turbofan derivative, Boeing 707-138B, with delivery scheduled for the following year.

=== The jet age: 1959 to 1992 ===
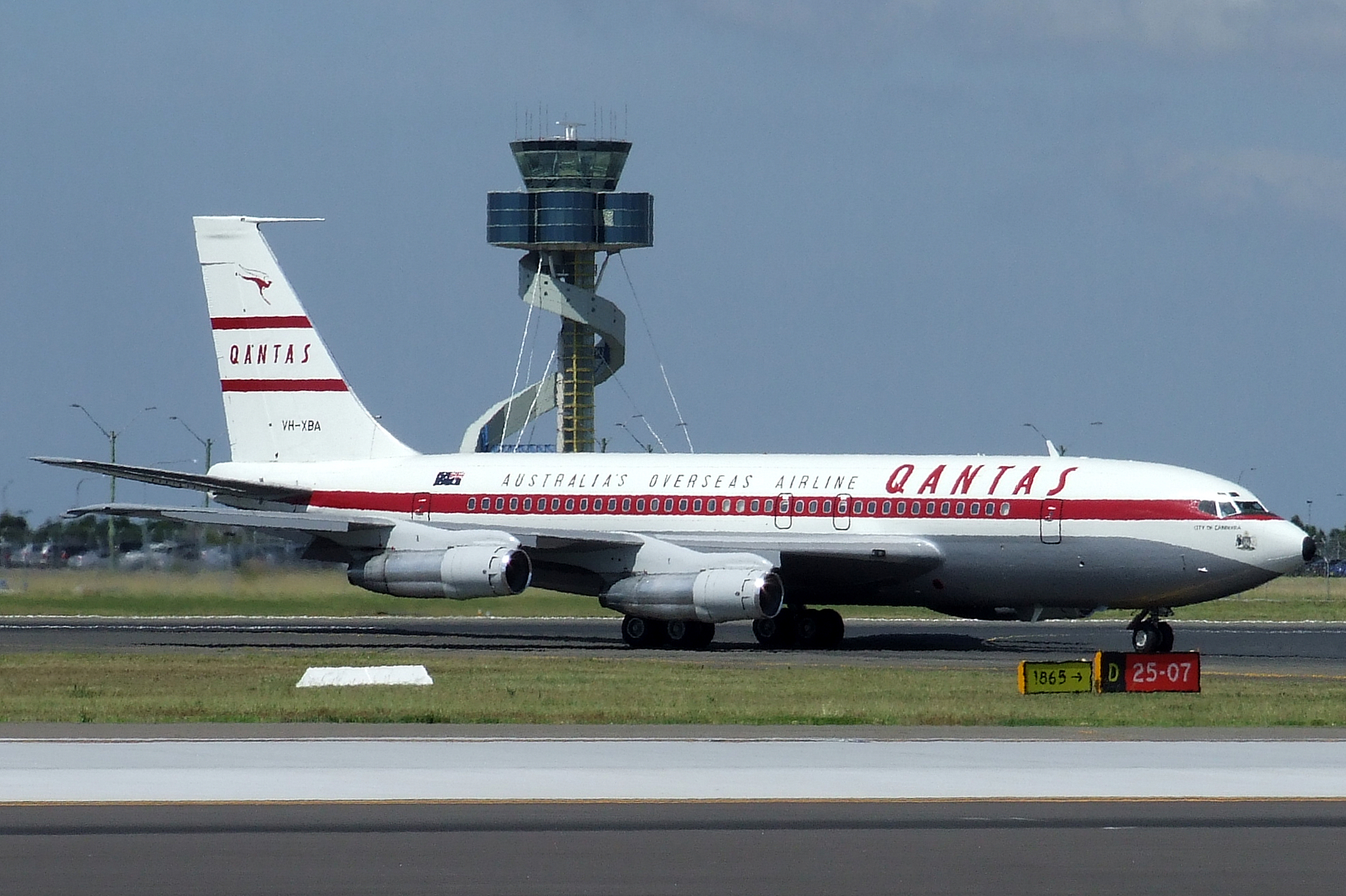
Qantas' first Boeing 707 was restored in the UK in the middle of the first decade of the 21st century and flown to Australia to be put on display in a museum

The first jet aircraft on the Australian register (and the 29th 707 built) was registered VH-EBA and named City of Canberra. This aircraft returned to Australia as VH-XBA in December 2006 for display in the Qantas Founders Museum at Longreach. The Boeing 707-138 was a shorter version of the Boeing 707 that was ordered only by Qantas. The first Qantas jet service was on 29 July 1959 from Sydney to San Francisco via Nadi and Honolulu. On 5 September 1959 Qantas became the third airline to fly jets across the North Atlantic, after BOAC and Pan Am, operating between London and New York as part of the service from Sydney. All of the turbojet aircraft were converted to upgraded turbofan engines in 1961 and were rebranded as V-Jets from the Latin vannus meaning fan. While jets superseded Super Constellations on the Kangaroo and Southern Cross services, they remained flying on the Wallaby Route.

Air travel grew substantially in the early 1960s, so Qantas ordered the larger Boeing 707-338C series of aircraft. While waiting for these to be delivered, Qantas operated six deHavilland Comet 4 aircraft wet-leased from BOAC between 7 November 1959 to 30 May 1963. The aircraft were crewed by BOAC flight and cabin crew and featured Qantas titles on the fuselage in place of the BOAC titles. In 1966 the airline diversified its business by opening the 450-room Wentworth Hotel in Sydney. The same year, Qantas placed early options on the new Concorde airliner but the orders were eventually cancelled. Also in 1966, the Fiesta route opened from Sydney to London via Fiji, Tahiti, Mexico City, Acapulco, Nassau and Bermuda. In September 1965 Qantas launched the first V-Jet service on the Kangaroo Route, via Kuala Lumpur, Malaysia.

In 1967 the airline placed orders for the Boeing 747. This aircraft could seat up to 350 passengers, a major improvement over the Boeing 707. Orders were placed for four aircraft with deliveries commencing in 1971. The later delivery date allowed Qantas to take advantage of the −200B version, which better suited its requirements. Also in 1967, Qantas Empire Airways changed its name to Qantas Airways, the name of the airline today. From late 1968 Qantas technical representatives worked at Everett, WA, with Boeing to customise the 747 to its needs, which resulted in the updated 747B model. One of the changes included the extension of upper deck by 20 inches to allow for ten windows each side instead of three fitted on the original version.

When Cyclone Tracy devastated the town of Darwin at Christmas 1974, Qantas established a world record for the most people ever embarked on a single aircraft when it evacuated 673 people on a single Boeing 747 flight. It also established a record embarking 327 people on a Boeing 707. Later in the decade, Qantas placed options on two McDonnell Douglas DC-10 aircraft for flights to Wellington, New Zealand. These were not taken up, and two Boeing 747SPs were ordered instead. In March 1979, Qantas operated its final Boeing 707 flight from Auckland to Sydney, and became the only major airline in the world to have an all-747 fleet. That same year Qantas introduced Business class—the first airline in the world to do so.

In 1975 Qantas was headquartered in Qantas House in the City of Sydney.

The Boeing 767-200 was introduced in 1985, for New Zealand, Asia and Pacific routes. The same year, the Boeing 747-300 was introduced, featuring a stretched upper deck. The Boeing 747 fleet was upgraded from 1989 with the arrival of the new Boeing 747-400 series. The delivery flight of the first 747-400 was a world record for commercial aircraft, flying the 17,850 km (11,091 mi) from London to Sydney non-stop.

In 1990, Qantas established Australia Asia Airlines to operate services to Taiwan. Several Boeing 747SP and Boeing 767 aircraft were transferred from Qantas service. The airline ceased operations in 1996.

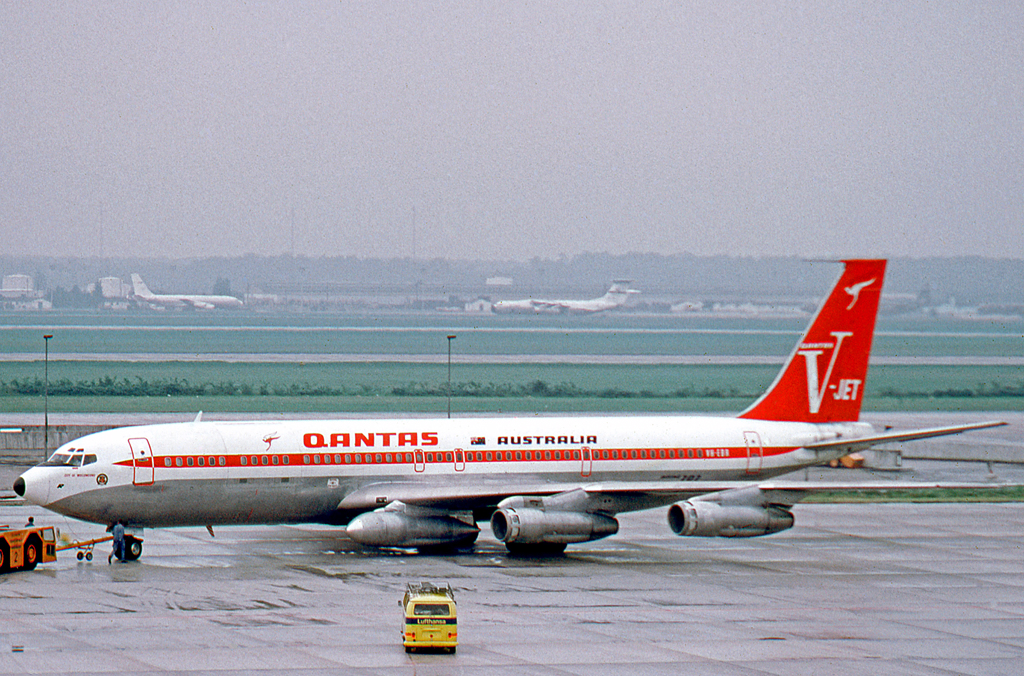
Qantas Boeing 707-338C convertible passenger/freight aircraft carrying a spare engine under its wing root at Frankfurt Airport in 1972

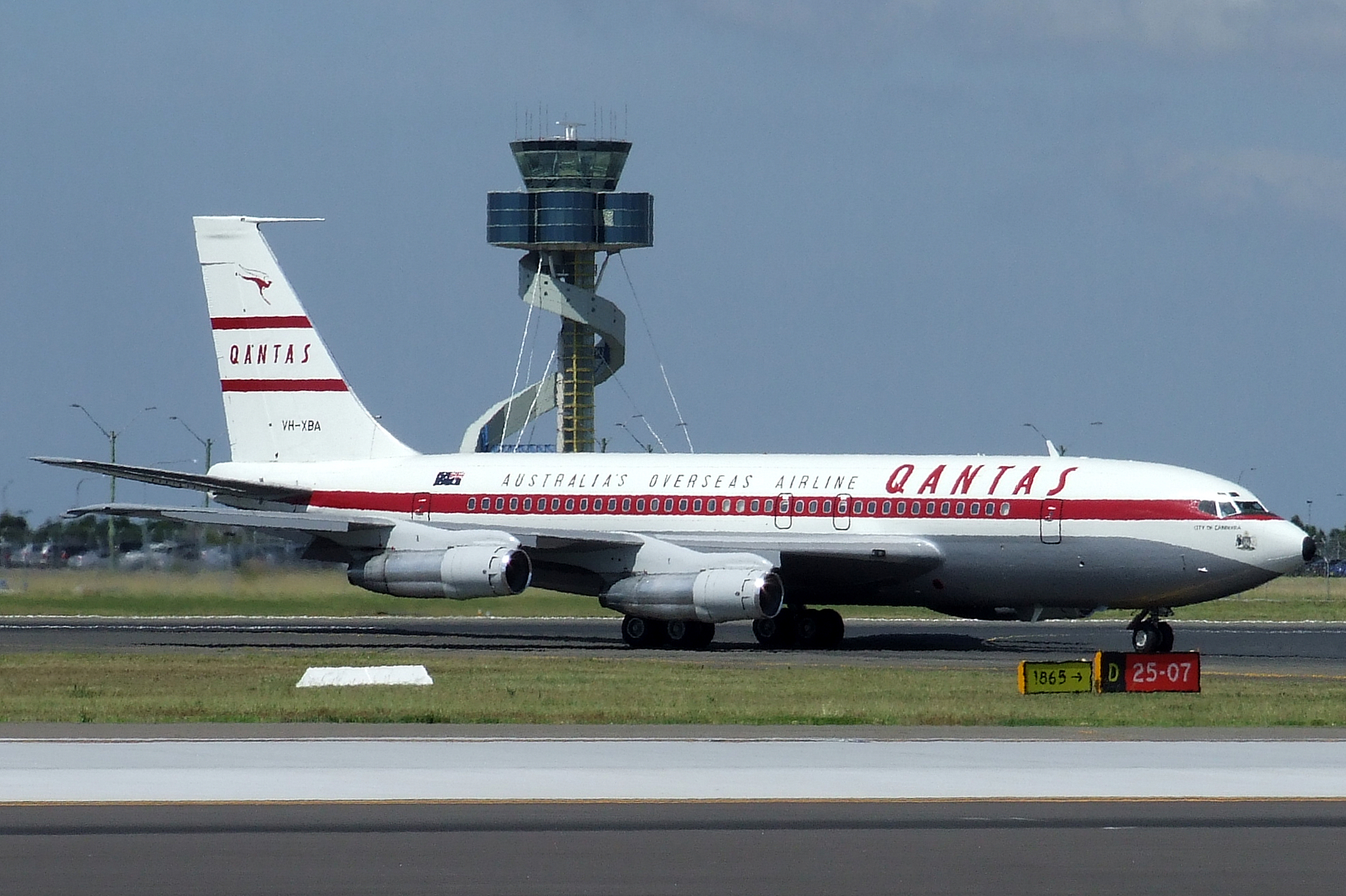
Qantas' first Boeing 707 was restored in the UK in the middle of the first decade of the 21st century and flown to Australia to be put on display in a museum

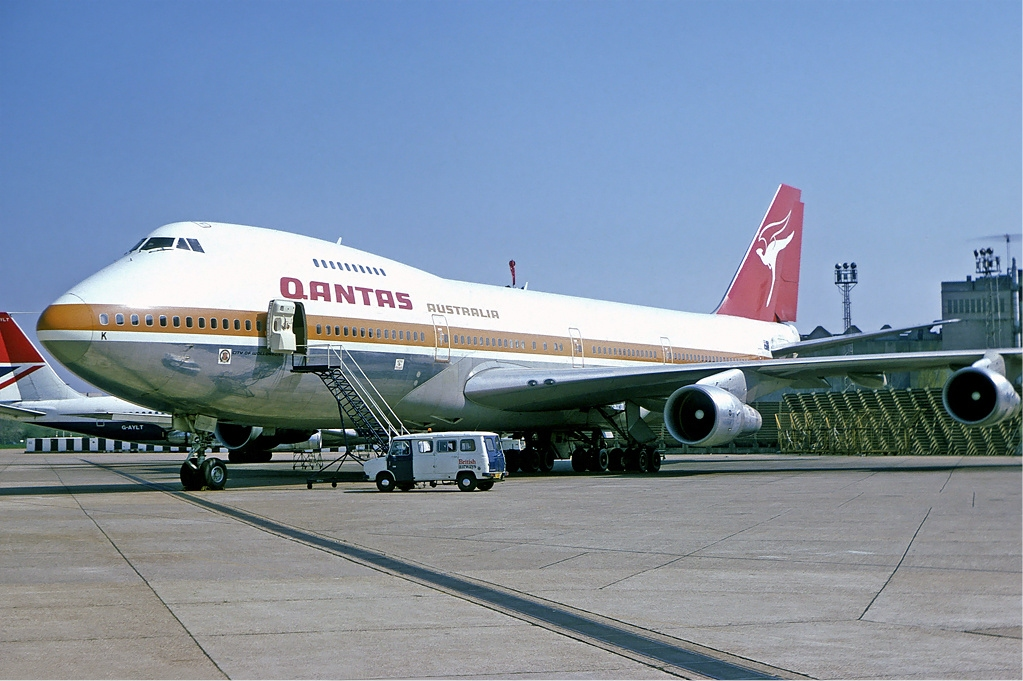
Qantas Boeing 747-200 at London Heathrow Airport in 1978

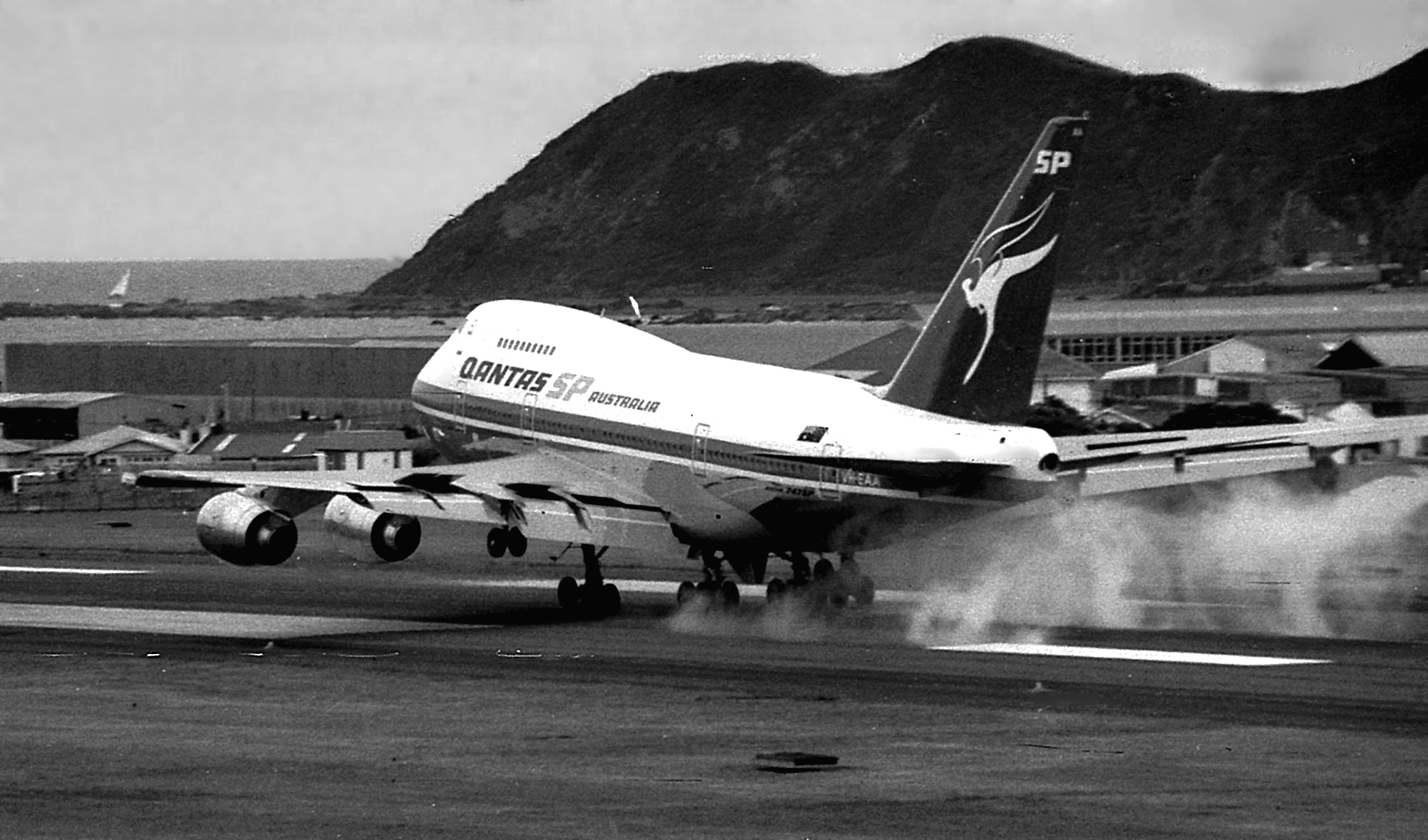
747SP lands at Wellington, New Zealand in 1981

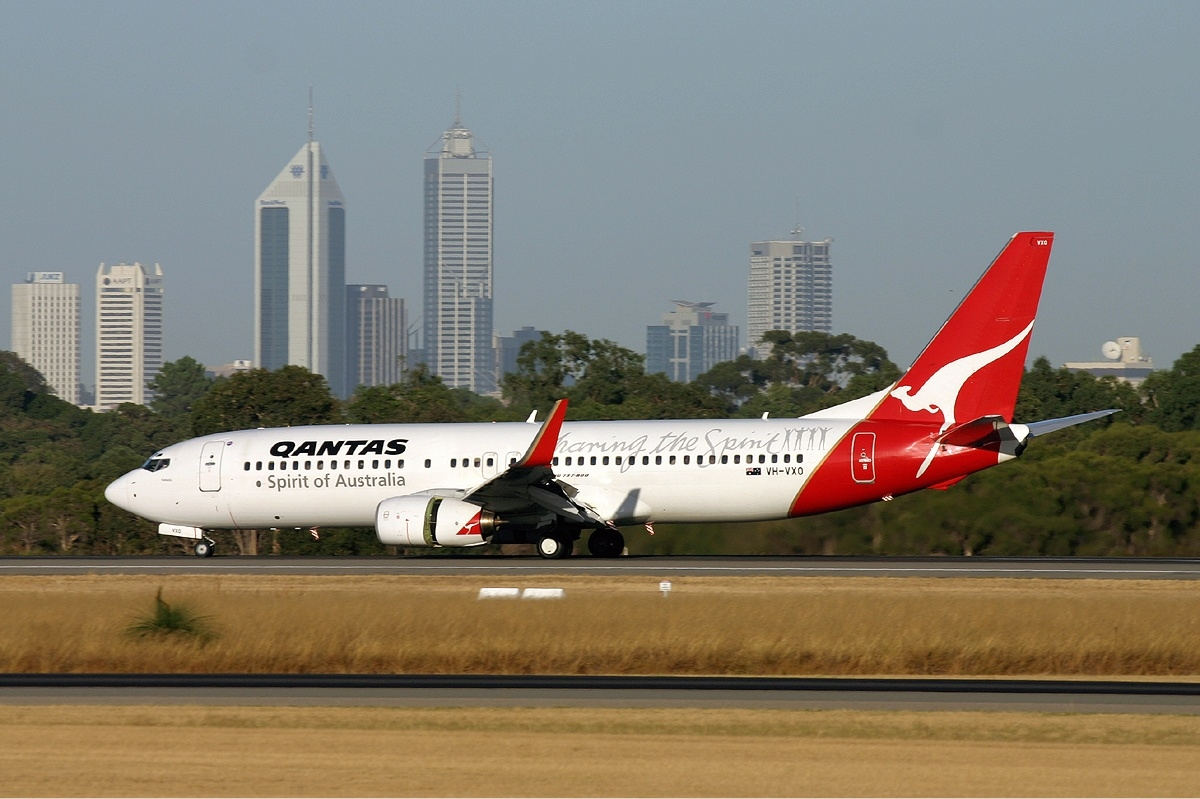
Boeing 737-800 at Perth Airport with the city of Perth in the background (2004).

=== Privatisation: 1992 to 2006 ===
The Australian Government sold the domestic carrier Australian Airlines to Qantas in August 1992, giving it access to the national domestic market for the first time in its history. The purchase saw the introduction of the Boeing 737 and Airbus A300 to the fleet, though the A300s were soon retired. Qantas was privatised in March 1993, with British Airways taking a 25% stake in the airline for A$665 million. After a number of delays, the remainder of the Qantas float proceeded in 1995. The public share offer took place in June and July of that year, with the government receiving A$1.45 billion in proceeds. The remaining shares were disposed of in 1995–96 and 1996–97. Investors outside Australia took a strong interest in the float, securing 20% of the stock which, together with British Airways' 25% holding, meant that, once floated on the stock exchange, Qantas was 55% Australian-owned and 45% foreign-owned. By law, Qantas must be at least 51% Australian-owned, and the level of foreign ownership is constantly monitored.

In 1998, Qantas co-founded the Oneworld alliance with American Airlines, British Airways, Canadian Airlines, and Cathay Pacific. The alliance commenced operation in February 1999, with Iberia Airlines and Finnair joining later that year. Oneworld markets itself at the premium travel market, offering passengers a larger network than each airline could on its own. The airlines also work together to provide operational synergies to keep costs down.

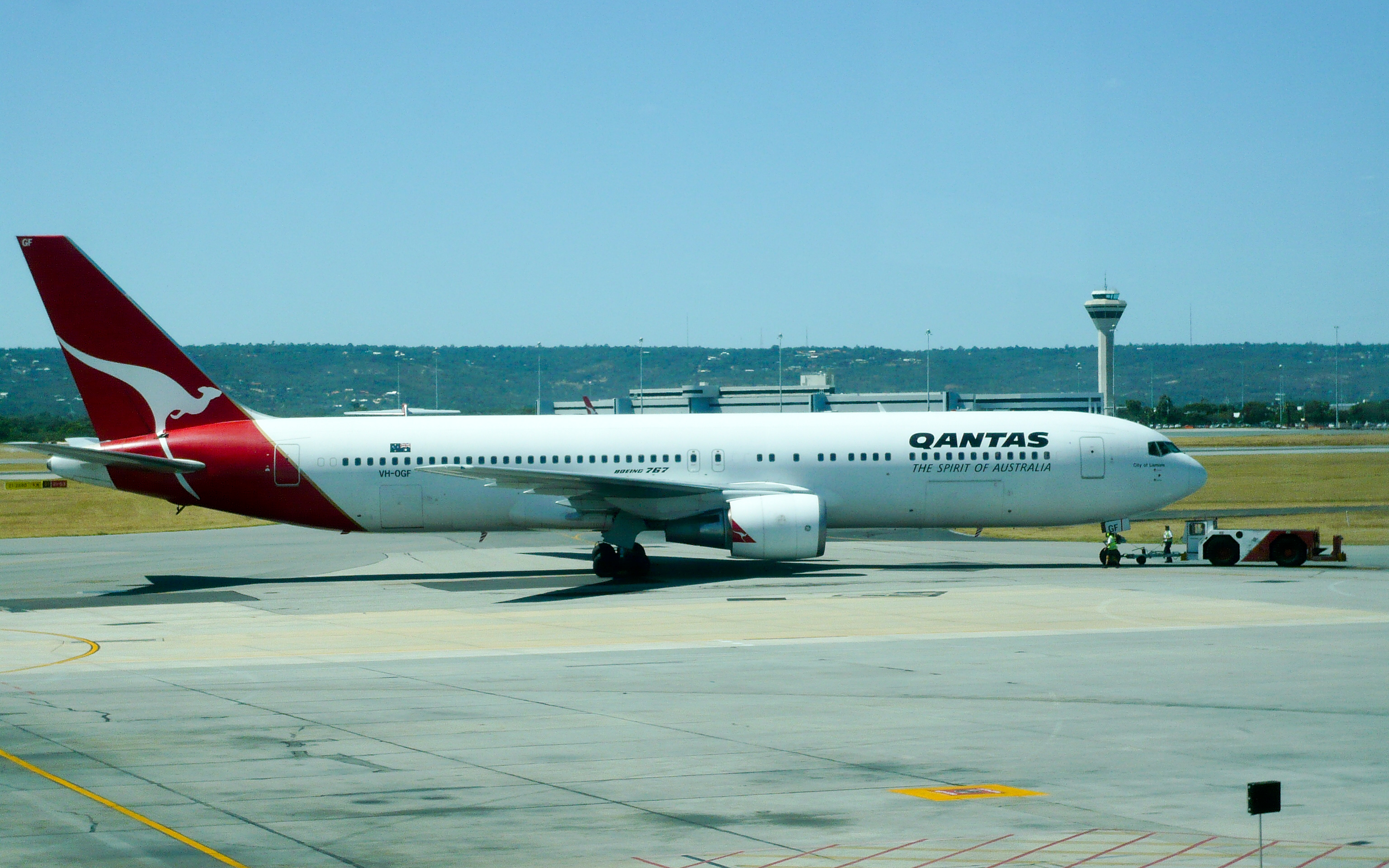
Boeing 767-300ER at Perth Airport

Qantas ordered twelve Airbus A380-800s in 2000, with options for twelve more. Eight of these options were exercised in 2006, bringing firm orders to twenty. Qantas is the third airline to receive A380s, after Singapore Airlines and Emirates. As part of the order, Qantas also confirmed a place for 15 A330's in its fleet, divided among 7 -200 and 6 -300 variants. The first of '330s began trickling in during 2002.

The main domestic competitor to Qantas, Ansett Australia, collapsed on 14 September 2001. Market share for Qantas immediately neared 90%, with the relatively new budget airline Virgin Blue holding the remainder. To capitalise on this event, Qantas ordered Boeing 737-800 aircraft, obtaining them a mere three months later. This unusually short time between order and delivery was possible due to the 11 September 2001 attacks in the United States; the subsequent downturn in the US aviation market meant American Airlines no longer needed the 737-800 aircraft it had ordered. The delivery positions were reassigned to Qantas on condition the aircraft remained in American Airlines configuration for later possible lease purposes.

At the same time, Virgin Blue announced a major expansion in October 2001, which was successful in eventually pushing the Qantas domestic market share back to 60%. To prevent any further loss of market share, Qantas responded by creating a new cut-price subsidiary airline, Jetstar. This has been successful in keeping the status quo at around 65% for Qantas Group airlines and 30% for Virgin Blue, with other regional airlines accounting for the rest of the market.

Qantas had also developed a full-service all-economy international carrier focused on the holiday and leisure market, which had taken on the formerly used Australian Airlines name. This airline ceased operating its own-liveried aircraft in July 2006, with the staff operating Qantas services before being closed entirely in September 2007, with the staff joining the new Qantas base in Cairns.

Qantas has also expanded into the New Zealand domestic air travel market, firstly with a shareholding in Air New Zealand and then with a franchise takeover of Ansett New Zealand. In 2003, Qantas attempted and failed to obtain regulatory approval to purchase a larger (but still minority) stake in Air New Zealand. Subsequently, Qantas stepped-up competition on the trans-Tasman routes, introducing Jetstar to New Zealand. British Airways sold its 18.5% stake in Qantas in September 2004 for £425 million, though keeping its close ties with Qantas intact.

On 13 December 2004, the first flight of Jetstar Asia took off from its Singapore hub to Hong Kong, marking Qantas' entry into the Asian cut-price market. Qantas owns 44.5% of the carrier.

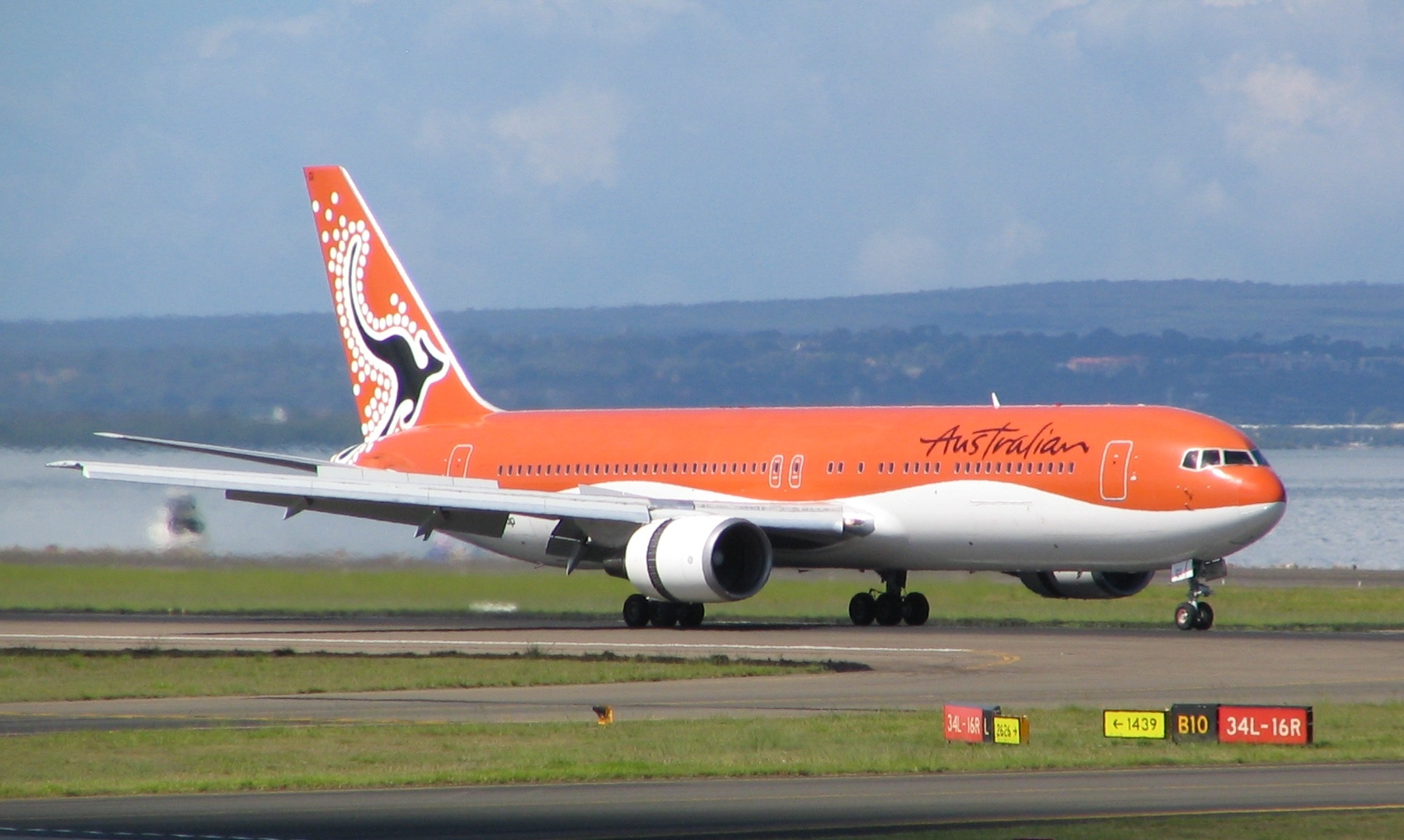
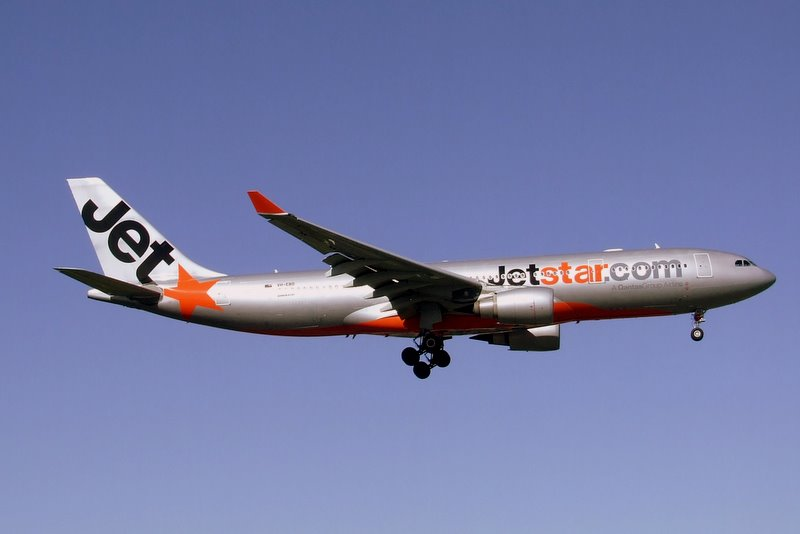
In 2006, Qantas shut down Australian Airlines (left) after four years of operation, in favour of the more competitive Jetstar (right)

On 14 December 2005 Qantas announced an order for 115 Boeing 787-8 and 787-9 aircraft (45 firm orders, 20 options and 50 purchase rights). The aircraft will allow Qantas to replace its Boeing 767-300 fleet, increase capacity and establish new routes. This announcement came after a long battle between Boeing and Airbus to meet the airline's needs for fleet renewal and future routes. The first of the 787s were originally scheduled to be delivered in August 2008, with the 787-9s coming in 2011. However, on 10 April 2008 Qantas announced that the intended August delivery of the 787s has been delayed for a further 15 months from the original delivery date. In the interim, Qantas Chief Executive Officer Geoff Dixon stated that Qantas would claim substantial liquidated damages from Boeing under the purchase agreement, and use those funds to offset the costs of leasing alternative aircraft.

In December 2006, Qantas was the subject of a failed bid from a consortium calling itself Airline Partners Australia. This bid failed in April 2007, with the consortium not gaining the percentage of shares it needed to complete the takeover.

=== Qantas since 2007 ===
Qantas's main international hubs are Sydney, Melbourne and Brisbane. However, Qantas operates a significant number of international flights into and out of Singapore Changi, Auckland, Los Angeles International and London Heathrow airports. Its domestic hubs are Sydney, Melbourne, Brisbane, Perth, and Adelaide airports, but the company also has a strong presence in Cairns and Canberra airports. It serves a range of international and domestic destinations.

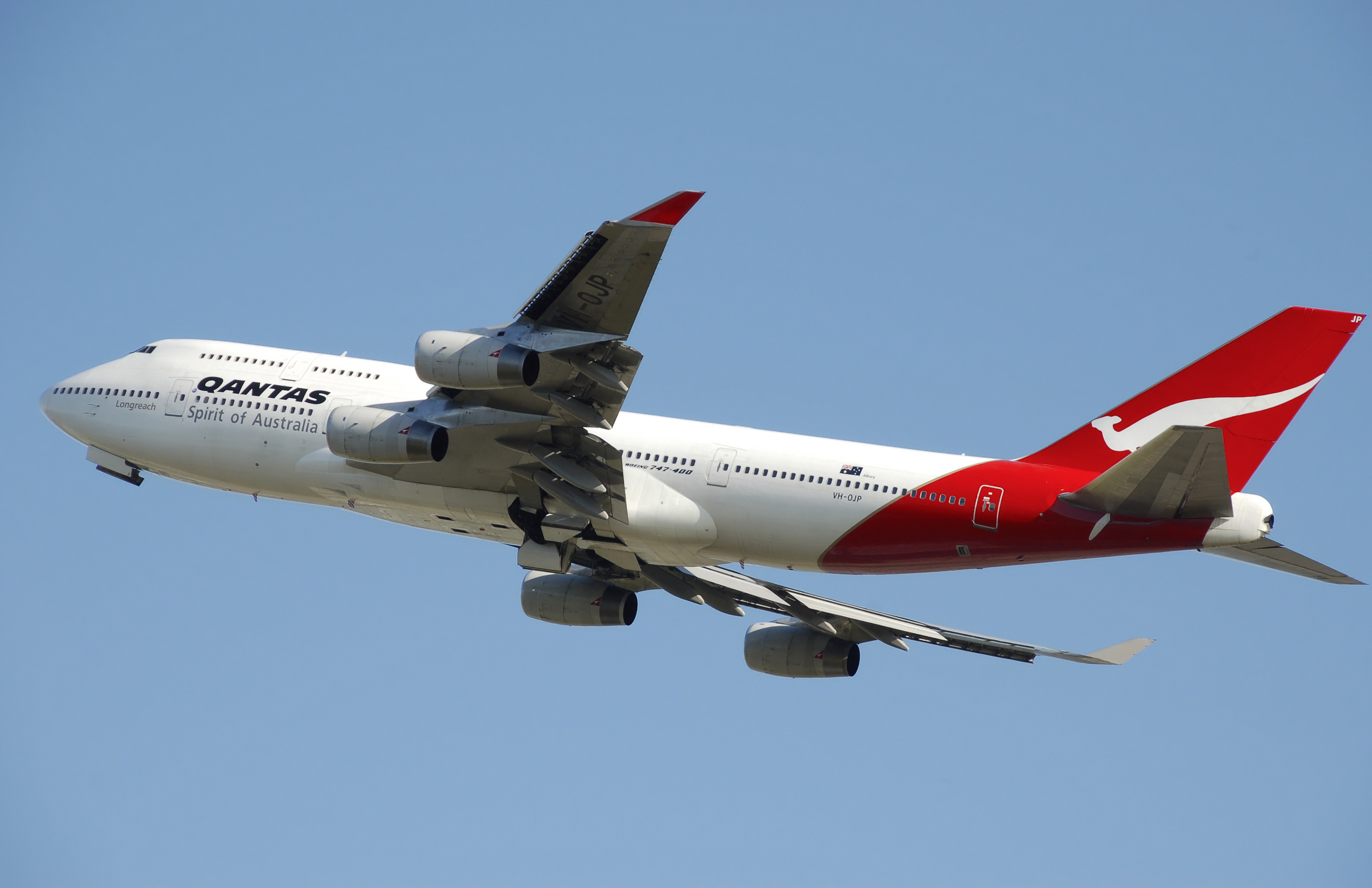
Boeing 747-400 at takeoff

Qantas wholly owns Jetstar, Jetconnect (which operates international services between Australia and New Zealand), QantasLink (including Sunstate Airlines and Eastern Australia Airlines), and Qantas Freight (which itself wholly owns Australian airExpress and Express Freighters Australia). Qantas did have a minor 4.2% stake in Air New Zealand, but this was sold on 26 June 2007. Qantas has a 46% shareholding in Fiji Airways.

Qantas has stepped up the expansion of Jetstar, with the launch of international services (in addition to existing trans-Tasman and Jetstar Asia flights) to leisure destinations such as Bali, Ho Chi Minh City, Osaka and Honolulu having begun in November 2006. On some routes (such as Sydney–Honolulu) Jetstar supplements existing Qantas operations, but many routes are new to the network. The lower cost base of Jetstar allows the previously unprofitable or marginal routes to be operated at greater profitability.

The Boeing 747, which constituted the entire Qantas fleet in the early 1980s, is being retired by the airline. The last three 747-300s were retired at the end of 2008 and the 747-400 series have, at present, been gradually phased out since 2012, replaced by the Airbus A380 and Boeing 787-9 Dreamliner.

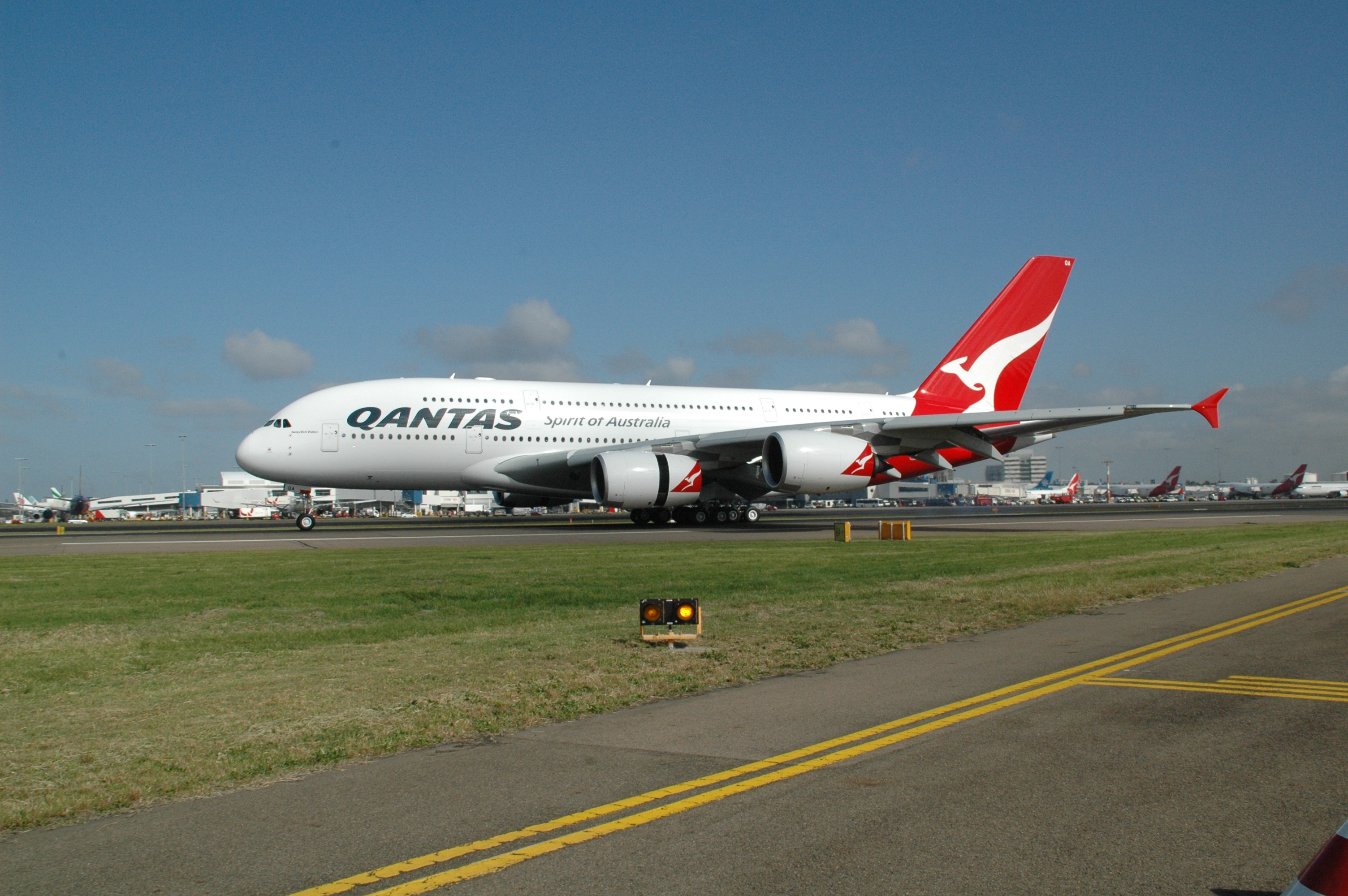
VH-OQA, the first Qantas Airbus A380, lands at Sydney Airport at the end of its first flight to Australia

On 1 July 2008 Qantas became a 58% shareholder in the Jetset Travelworld Group (known as Helloworld Travel from 2013 and Helloworld Travel from 2017), by corporatising its leisure and corporate travel divisions; Qantas Holidays and Qantas Business Travel and selling them to Jetset Travelworld Group. This deal created a vertically integrated travel company with retail, wholesale and corporate sales arms.

Also in 2008 the first Qantas Airbus A380 was handed over by Airbus at a ceremony on 19 September. During this ceremony, Qantas announced that it was considering ordering four more A380s. The aircraft arrived on Australian soil on the morning of 21 September, when it touched down at Sydney Airport. Qantas' first route for the A380 was Melbourne to Los Angeles beginning on 20 October 2008, then from Sydney to Los Angeles. The second A380, which was delivered in December 2008, increased the service frequency on the same routes. Subsequent aircraft to be delivered will further expand services, initially on the Kangaroo Route.

On 2 December 2008, British Airways confirmed that talks were underway regarding a possible merger between the two companies. They would merge as a dual-listed company with shares listed both on the London Stock Exchange and Australian Securities Exchange. However, on 18 December 2008, the two companies called off their merger discussions over ownership issues in the aftermath of a merger. If the merger between Qantas and British Airways and the previously announced merger between British Airways and Iberia Airlines had both occurred, it would have created the largest airline company in the world.

On 29 December 2008, Qantas flew its last scheduled Boeing 747-300 service, operating from Melbourne to Los Angeles via Auckland. The final 747-300 flight was on 20 January 2009 when the last of the three 747-300s was ferried to the United States for storage, bringing to a close over 24 years and 524,000 flying hours of operations. The final 747-300 flight was also the last time a Qantas aircraft flew with a flight engineer.

During the 2008 financial crisis Qantas said it could "ditch" some first-class seats on some short International routes to maximise profits. Its share price has been steadily rising after its low point in March 2009 and the airline's profit fell by 88% to $117 million for the year to June but despite this, it was one of the few international airlines to report a profit for the financial year. The company blamed the figures on a drop in customer demand and said it was scrapping dividend payments. Qantas said passengers would only be able to fly first class between Australia and London, via Singapore, and between Australia and Los Angeles.

In November 2012, Qantas took full ownership of Australian airExpress after buying Australia Post's 50% shareholding. At the same time it sold its 50% interest in StarTrack to Australia Post.

Paris-based Australian designer Martin Grant is responsible for the new Qantas airline staff uniforms that were publicly unveiled on 16 April 2013. Qantas ambassador and model Miranda Kerr assisted with the launch of the new outfit for which the colours of navy blue, red, and fuchsia pink are combined. Qantas chief executive Alan Joyce stated that the new design "speaks of Australian style on the global stage" at the launch event that involved Qantas employees modelling the uniform. Grant consulted with Qantas staff members over the course of one year to finalise the 35 styles that were eventually created.

To account for a low Australian dollar and rising fuel costs, Qantas announced at the end of July 2013 that fuel surcharges on international flights would increase by A$75 (one way). In addition, domestic base fares will rise by two to three per cent.

On 24 March 2018, a Boeing 787 operated the first ever scheduled non-stop commercial flight between Australia and Europe. Flight QF9, was a 17-hour, 14,498 km (9,009-mile) journey from Perth to London Heathrow. In 2019 Qantas launched 19-hour flights on a restricted payload between New York and London to Sydney with 787-9s. In April 2018, Qantas sold its Q Catering arm to dnata. In February 2019, Qantas purchased a 20% shareholding in Alliance Airlines.

On 4 February 2021, a 3-year deal with Alliance Airlines was announced to access 3 E190 aircraft on a wet lease with flexibility to use up to 11 additional aircraft (for a total of 14). The aircraft would initially be used between Adelaide, Darwin and Alice Springs. Since then Qantas has steadily increased its use of the aircraft and have currently agreed to operate 26 aircraft with 4 options remaining, by April 2024.

On 2 March 2022, Qantas announced a major order with Airbus to firm up its domestic orders for Project Winton, with a firm order for 20 Airbus A321XLR aircraft and 20 Airbus A220-300 (later increased to 29 through activation of purchase rights). The order included 94 purchase rights spread across multiple aircraft and a 10-year period allowing for flexibility for the group. With an existing order already being in place with Airbus of 109 A320neo aircraft (including options), subsequently meaning the group has access to up to 299 narrowbody aircraft if all options are used.

On the same day Qantas also announced an order for 12 Airbus A350-1000 aircraft to operate Project Sunrise flights, enabling the group to achieve what it calls 'the final frontier of travel' and fly non-stop from the east coast of Australia to any other city (including New York and London). The aircraft will only have 238 seats onboard (the lowest of any aircraft in that class) with 40% being dedicated to premium, with Qantas designing new seats for all cabins to ensure the flagship service is up to the new standards of the 21st century.

On 24 August 2023, Qantas announced another order for aircraft to operate international service under Project Fysh, with a firm order for four 787-9, eight 787-10 and another 12 Airbus A350-1000 aircraft (for a total of 24). With the A350-1000 expected to have a different seating configuration to those operating Project Sunrise flights. These aircraft will be used to replace the Airbus A330 and A380 in the Qantas fleet from 2027 and 2032 respectively.

Having acquired a 51% shareholding in TripADeal in 2022, in June 2024 Qantas took full ownership.

== Company heads ==
The company heads of Qantas throughout the years since its inception in 1920. The people listed below lead Qantas through its many different structures, branding and variations, with its current structure being in place since 1993.

Chairpersons of QANTAS
Order	Chairperson	Period	Reference
1	Fergus McMaster	1920–1923	
2	Frederick Achibald	1923–1926	
3	Fergus McMaster	1926–1946	
4	Hudson Fysh	1946–1966	
5	Roald Wilson	1966–1973	
6	Don Anderson	1973–1975	
7	Lennox Hewitt	1975–1980	
8	Jim Leslie	1980–1989	
9	Bill Dix	1989–1993	
10	Gary Pemberton	1993–2000	
11	Margaret Jackson	2000–2007	
12	Leigh Clifford	2007–2018	
13	Richard Goyder	2018–2024	
14	John Mullen	2024–present	
Managing directors / CEOs of QANTAS
Order	MDs / CEOs	Period	Reference
1	Marcus Griffin	1920–1923	
2	Hudson Fysh	1923-1955	
3	Cedric O Turner	1955–1967	
4	Robert Ritchie	1967–1976	
5	Keith Hamilton	1976–1984	
6	Ron Yates	1984–1986	
7	John Menadue	1986–1989	
8	John Ward	1989–1993	
9	James Strong	1993–2001	
10	Geoffrey Dixon	2001–2008	
11	Alan Joyce	2008–2023	
12	Vanessa Hudson	2023–present	

== Livery and logos ==
The Qantas kangaroo logo made its first appearance in 1944, painted on a Liberator to celebrate the renaming of the Indian Ocean Route to "Kangaroo Service". The design was adapted from the design on the reverse side of the contemporary one-penny coin. Since then, the kangaroo has undergone four major changes. To better suit its airborne nature, wings were added to the kangaroo in 1947 by Gert Sellheim and it was painted on the tail of the Lockheed Super Constellations in 1954. These Super Constellations used a predominantly white livery with a red cheatline.

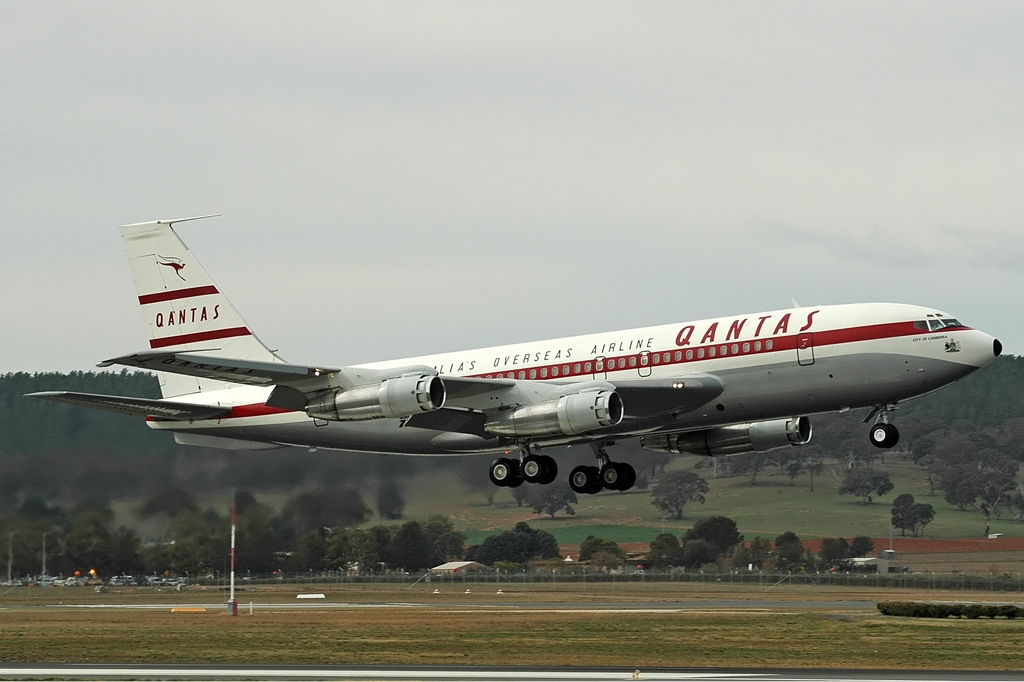
Boeing 707 with "Red Stripe" livery featuring red wordmark on whitetail and red cheatline, livery used 1959–1961. Piston aircraft wore a similar, but identical livery from 1955 to 1959.

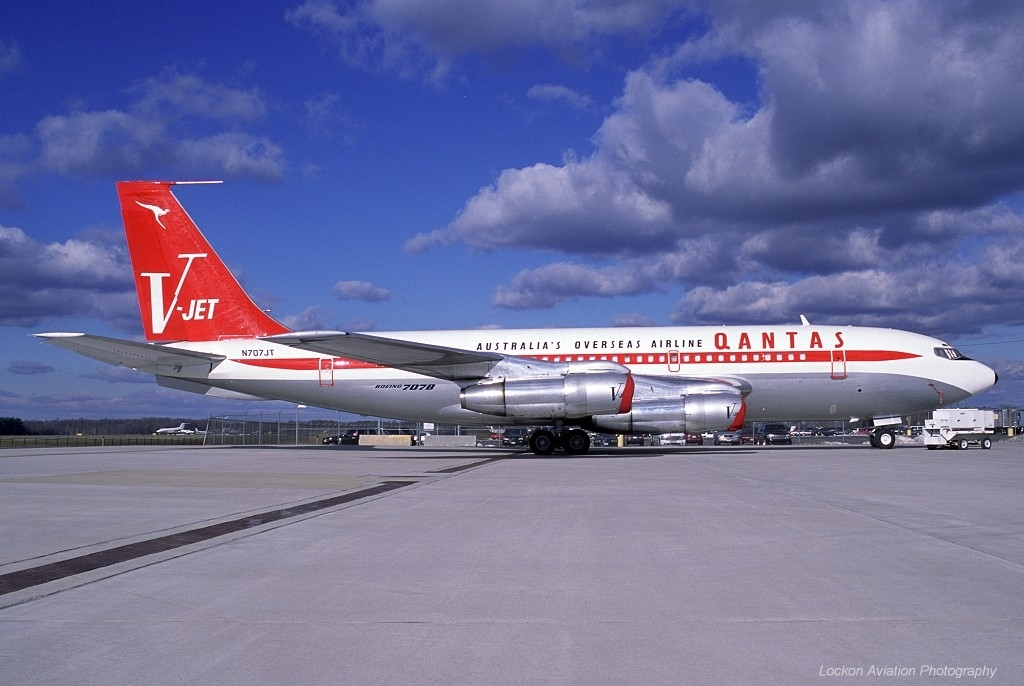
Boeing 707 with "V-Jet" livery used 1961–1971. Piston and turboprop aircraft wore a similar livery, with a white tail and a red stripe with the Qantas wordmark within it and Flying Kangaroo symbol positioned above the stripe from 1959 to 1971.

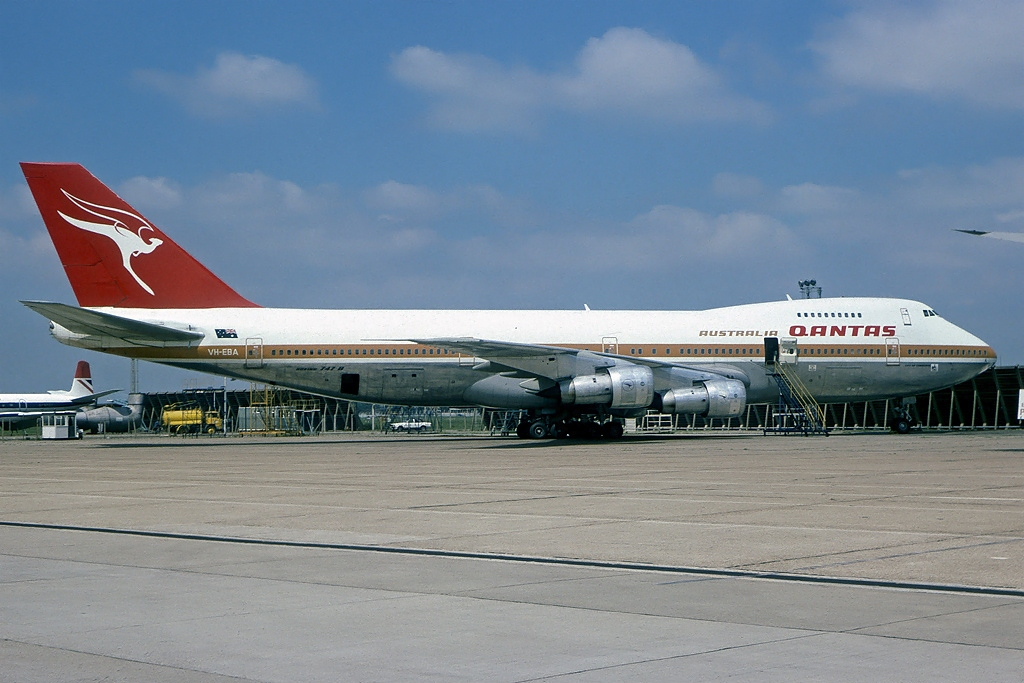
Boeing 747 with "Flying Kangaroo" livery used 1971–1984; note ochre cheatline

In 1959, Qantas was the first airline outside the United States to operate the Boeing 707 jetliner, making its inaugural flight from Sydney to San Francisco on 29 July 1959. The aircraft of the initial 707 fleets were painted in 'Red Stripe' livery with white tailfins marked with the red "flying kangaroo" logo and the Qantas wordmark or aircraft registration as used on other aircraft since 1955. Piston and turboprop aircraft later had tailfins carrying a red stripe with the Qantas wordmark within it and the flying kangaroo symbol from 1959 to 1971.

Qantas later purchased the 707-138B variant with turbofan engines in 1961; these were prominently painted in 'V-Jet' livery with red tailfins marked with the words "V-Jet" ("V" standing for the Latin word vannus, meaning fan). In 1998, actor John Travolta acquired one of the 707-138Bs originally delivered to Qantas in 1961, had it repainted in the V-Jet livery in 2002, and donated it to the Historical Aircraft Restoration Society.

To mark the arrival of the Boeing 747 in 1971, the new Qantas livery made the Flying Kangaroo logo the dominant tailfin element and the cheatline colour was changed to ochre.

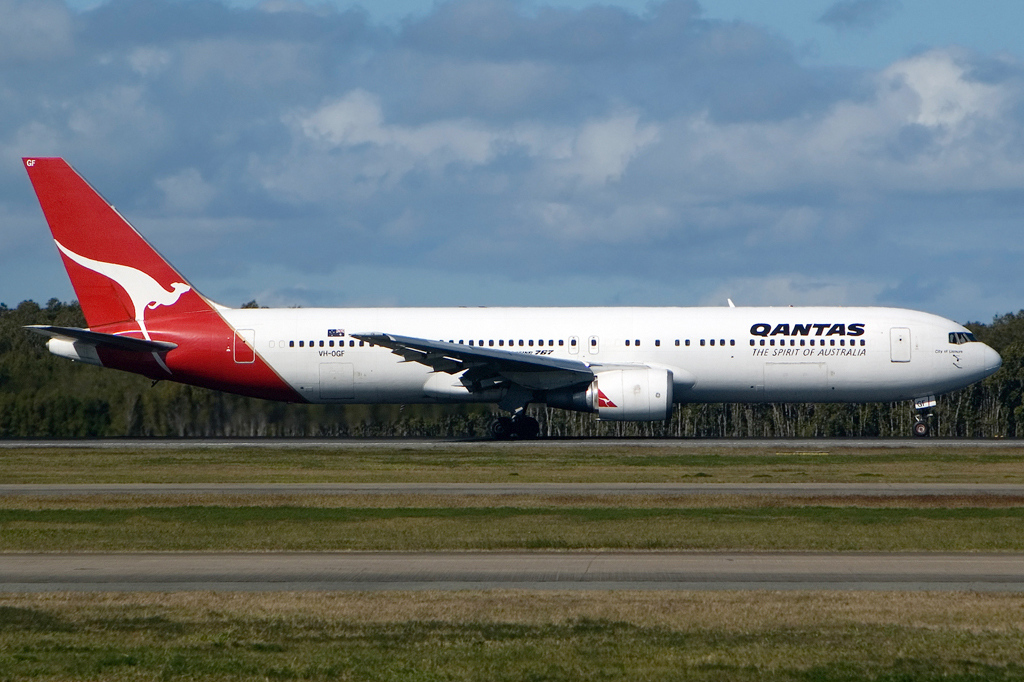
Boeing 767 with "'Roo" livery and "Spirit of Australia" strapline, livery used 1984–2007

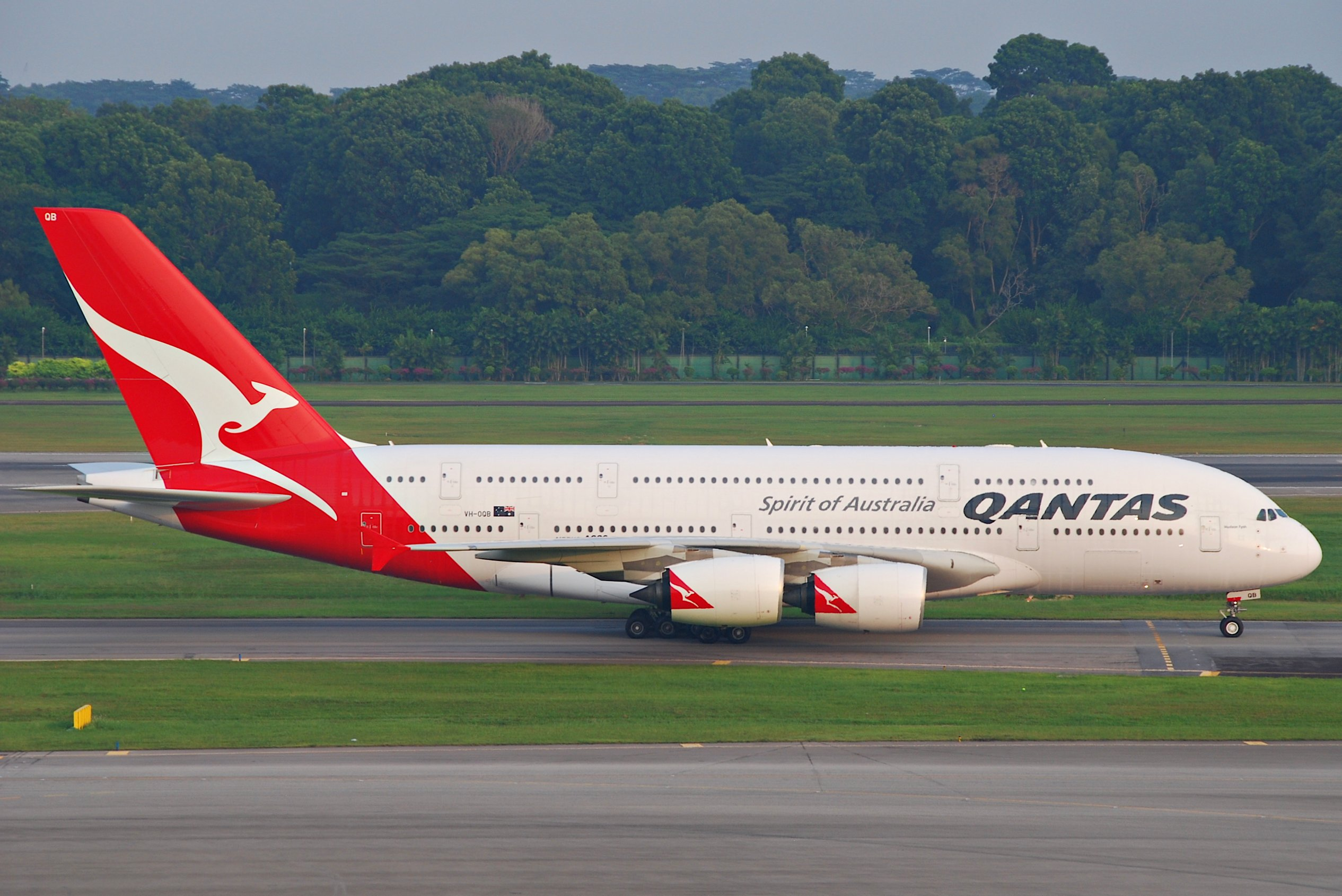
Airbus A380 with "New 'Roo" livery used 2007–2016

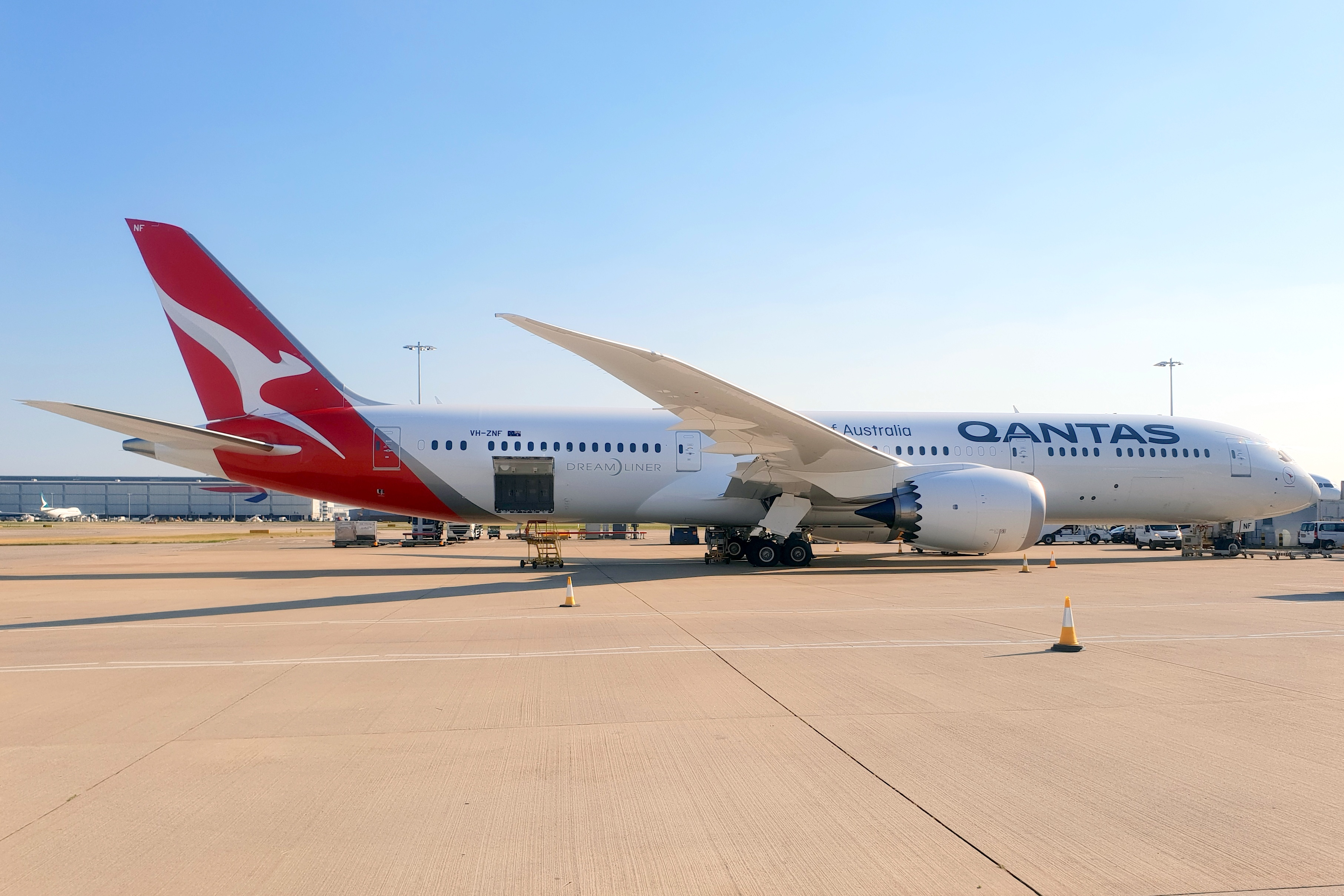
Boeing 787 with Newson/Houston Group-designed "Silver 'Roo" livery used 2016–present

The livery was updated again in 1984 preceding the launch of Boeing 767 service for Qantas in 1985. In the 1984 livery, the Flying Kangaroo on the tail lost its wings and the coloured cheatline was dropped, but the tailfin colour now extended onto the fuselage and a thin gold band was added to the tailfin's leading edge. Hans Hulsbosch worked on the 1984 logo update and proposed the strapline "Spirit of Australia", which had previously been used in marketing materials, should be added to the exterior markings.

The next major revision occurred in 2007, with the so-called 'New Roo' livery bringing a "polished, contoured Flying Kangaroo". and different text positioning, primarily to deal with technical issues arising from changes to the shape of airliner tails and surface areas on stabilisers being designated as no paint areas on the Airbus A380s. The 2007 revision was carried out by Hulsbosch Communications, leading a creative team that included input from Peter Morrissey, Neil Perry, and Marc Newson. The revision also included an exclusive typeface to match the new kangaroo and was first deployed on a 767, ahead of the launch of Airbus A380 service. Qantas Executive General Manager John Borghetti stated "the differences are subtle but distinctive ... our new flying kangaroo is sleeker and more contoured than the current version - a modern take on a design that has stood the test of time." The kangaroo's feet were carried forward to avoid the illusion that they had been cut off by the aircraft's wings, and the wing/tail was brought back to give it a more dynamic, in-flight look.

In 2016, a new livery with an updated kangaroo logo and exclusive typography designed by Marc Newson in partnership with Houston Group was unveiled on an Airbus A330-300 in preparation for the delivery of the first Boeing 787 for Qantas. According to Newson, a silver band was added "to give a more premium feel" and the typography was "carefully streamlined". The Qantas wordmark was added to the belly to enhance visual recognition from the ground. The Flying Kangaroo was made significantly more abstract, losing its arms and having a simplified head. The 1968 Flying Kangaroo symbol was also applied to the nose. The triangular symbol was reshaped to resemble the tail fin of a modern aircraft. The "Flying Kangaroo" graphic was changed by losing some details such as the arms and bolstered with some gradated areas to simulate a three-dimensional feel.
