= Hudson Fysh =

Australian aviator and businessman (1895–1974)

Sir Hudson Fysh KBE DFC
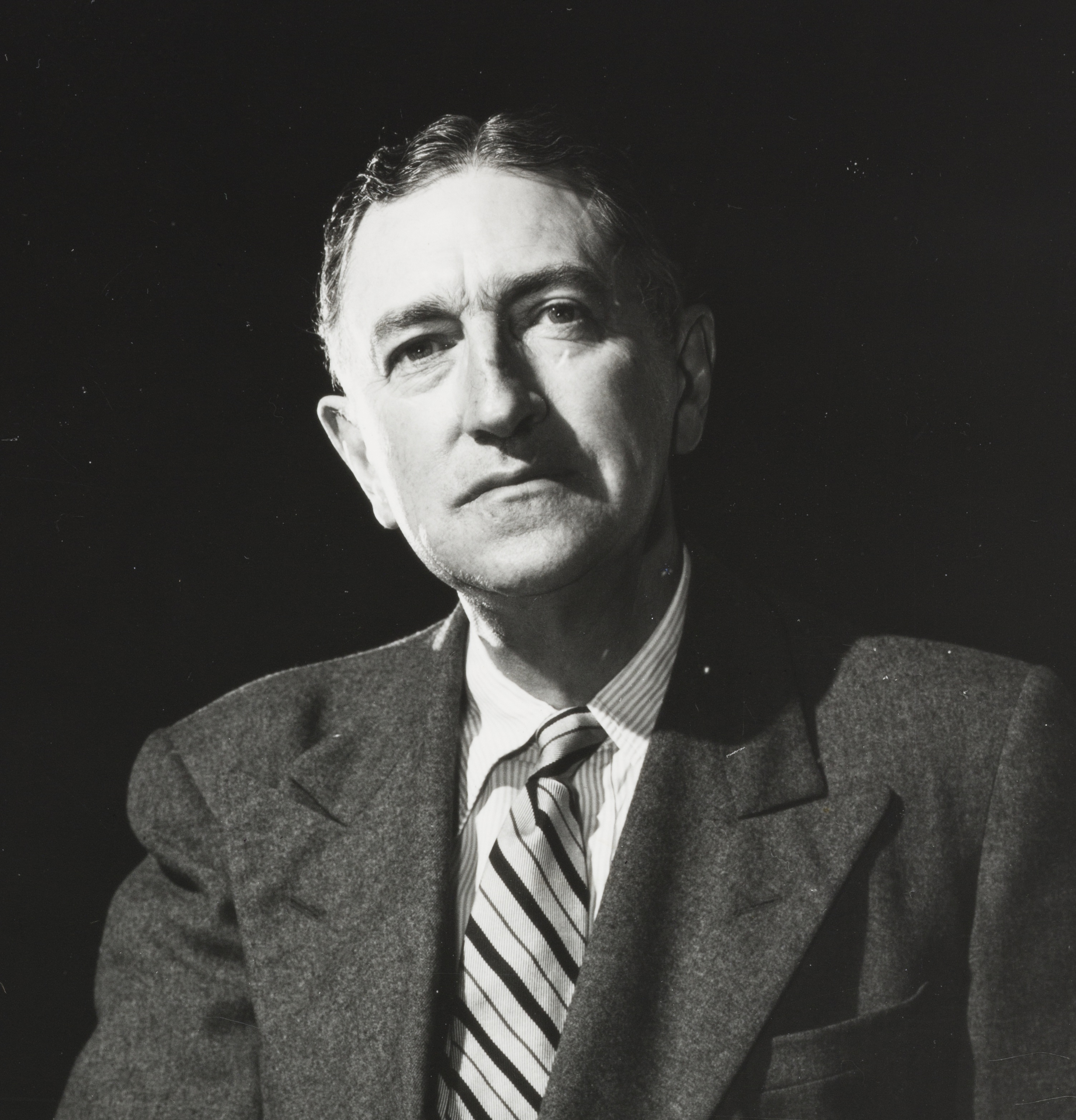
- Portrait of Hudson Fysh, ca. 1947, by Max Dupain
- Born: Sir Wilmot Hudson Fysh; 7 January 1895; Launceston, Tasmania, Australia
- Died: 6 April 1974 (aged 79); Paddington, New South Wales, Australia
- Known for: Co-founding Qantas
- Spouse: Elizabeth Eleanor Dove
- Relatives: Henry Reed (grandfather); Sir Philip Fysh (uncle)
- Awards: Knight Commander of the Order of the British Empire; Distinguished Flying Cross
- Aviation career
- Famous flights: First revenue flight in Australia
- Flight license: February 1919; Heliopolis, Egypt
- Air force: Australian Flying Corps; Royal Air Force
- Battles: World War I; Middle East theatre; Gallipoli campaign; World War II
- Rank: Squadron Leader

Sir Wilmot Hudson Fysh KBE DFC (7 January 1895 – 6 April 1974) was an Australian aviator and businessman. A founder of the Australian airline company Qantas, Fysh was born in Launceston, Tasmania. Serving in the Battle of Gallipoli and Palestine Campaign as a lieutenant of the Australian Light Horse Brigade, Fysh later became an observer and gunner to Paul McGinness in the AFC. He was awarded a Distinguished Flying Cross during the aftermath of the war for his services to aerial warfare.

Fysh, alongside Paul McGinness and Sir Fergus McMaster started Qantas in 1920. Despite government ownership, Fysh became managing director and chairman of Qantas. A committee member of the International Air Transport Association, he became president of the organisation in 1960. He was also one of the founders of the Australian National Travel Association, now known as the Australian Tourist Commission, a member of the Royal Aeronautical and British Interplanetary society, the Institute of Transport and the Australasian Pioneers Club.

Acknowledged for his work as an aviation historian, Fysh wrote books on the history and development of Qantas, exemplifying the airline's role in both military and civil aviation. Authoring a trilogy of memoirs dealing with the impact of Qantas in history, the series drew comparisons by critics towards Winston Churchill's The Second World War.

Fysh died in Paddington at the age of 79, on 6 April 1974.

== Early and personal life ==
Wilmot Hudson Fysh was born in the city of Launceston in Tasmania, Australia, on 7 January 1895. His father, Frederick Wilmot Fysh, was a merchant, while his mother, Mary (née Reed), was the daughter of a famous landowner, Henry Reed. Fysh was the oldest of five siblings; Hudson, Henry, Margaret, Mary and Graham. He was also the great-nephew of Sir Philip Fysh. His childhood was marred by the failure of his parents' marriage and his father's business. Originally staying with his father, he ran away so often that eventually he was able to stay with his mother. Living in St Leonards—a suburb of Launceston—until 1914, he enlisted in the Light Horse upon the start of World War I.

Educated at Launceston and Geelong grammar schools, Fysh worked as a jackaroo and woolclasser after his education. He was also a cadet in the 70 Infantry Militia as a teenager, before volunteering for the Tasmanian 26th Light Horse upon the outbreak of war. After the foundation of Qantas, Fysh, being a poor student at school, tried to make up for his lack of training by studying economics and taking a course in pelmanism. After his retirement from Qantas, Fysh received an honorary degree of Doctor of Engineering (EngD), in a commemoration ceremony from the University of Tasmania, in 1971.

Described as a man of "great political acumen" and having "a hard head for business", Fysh had a reputation as a stern, uncompromising taskmaster. This contrasted against his "shy, quiet" nature; he described himself as "painfully shy...as a child feeling looked down on, sensitive, and socially lost." Fysh felt these feelings never left him, being "ill at ease with fame or publicity." Described as single-minded in many instances, his insistence on using a D.H.86 (De Havilland Express 86) lead to a bitter clash and eventual fall-out between Fysh and Sir Gordon Taylor. Fysh also made rivals in other airline entrepreneurs such as Norman Brearley, a founder of Western Australian Airways.

On 5 December 1923, Fysh married Elizabeth Eleanor ("Nell") Dove, from Hunter River, in St James Church, Sydney. They had a son and daughter, John Hudson Fysh and Wendy Elizabeth Fysh, both born in Longreach, Queensland. Fysh described his family as "his bulwark against the [company's] relentless pressures"

== World War I ==
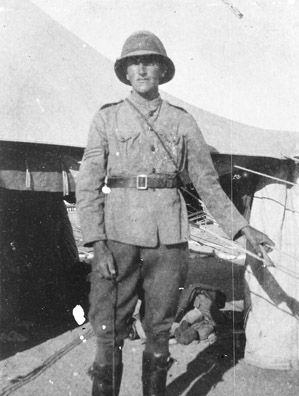
Hudson Fysh in Palestine, during World War I

On 25 August 1914, Fysh enlisted in the 3rd Regiment of the 1st Australian Light Horse Brigade at a training camp in Pontville, Tasmania, following the declaration of the Great War. Initially commissioned as a private, Fysh was transported from Hobart on the HMAT Geelong to Egypt on 20 October 1914. He received his training in Egypt, and arrived at Gallipoli in May 1915; only two weeks after the initial Anzacs had arrived. Fysh was evacuated in December 1915, after serving for 7 months in the Australian Imperial Force.

We lived like rats in their holes, and hung on to our hillside with the enemy on one side and the beach a few hundred yards away on the other.

— Hudson Fysh, on the Gallipoli Campaign

He served in Palestine and Sinai, fighting in the Palestine Campaign for the 'C' Squadron of the Light Horse Regiment. He was transferred from Palestine on 17 July 1916, to the 1st Light Horse Brigade, Machine Gun Squadron. First promoted to corporal, he was commissioned as a lieutenant in January 1917. Fighting under lieutenant Ross Smith in the Light Horse, he soon replaced Smith as the section officer when Smith was transferred to the Flying Corps.

In July 1917, Fysh requested a transfer from the Light Horse Brigade to the Royal Flying Corps. After months of training, he qualified as an observer and gunner, in October 1917. Originally fighting for the Royal Flying Corps No. 67 squadron, he later fought for the No.1 Squadron of the Australian Flying Corps, under the command of Major Richard Williams.

In the Flying Corps, Fysh was gunner to Major Sydney W. Addison and later to Lieutenant Paul McGinness. Engaging in battle as gunner in a Bristol Fighter, against German and Turkish aircraft in the Middle Eastern campaigns, Fysh was an observer ace, shooting down 5 enemy aircraft. On 8 January 1919, Fysh was recommended for the Distinguished Flying Cross. The award was gazetted in the London Gazette and the Commonwealth of Australia Gazette on 8 February 1919 and 23 May 1919 respectively.

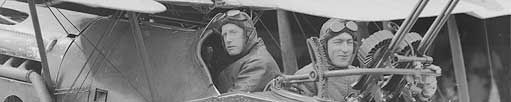
Major Sydney Addison and Hudson Fysh, in Palestine

His citation read:

For gallantry in air combat and in attacking ground objectives. On 31 August 1918 this officer, acting as Observer to Lieutenant McGuiness [sic!], DCM, attacked and destroyed two hostile two-seater aeroplanes ... On previous occasions (23 June and 3 August 1918) this Officer has engaged in combats, resulting in the destruction of enemy aircraft as well as forcing enemy machines to land ... ...He has always shown great skill and gallantry on these and other occasions.

== Career ==
=== Survey of the Great Air Race ===
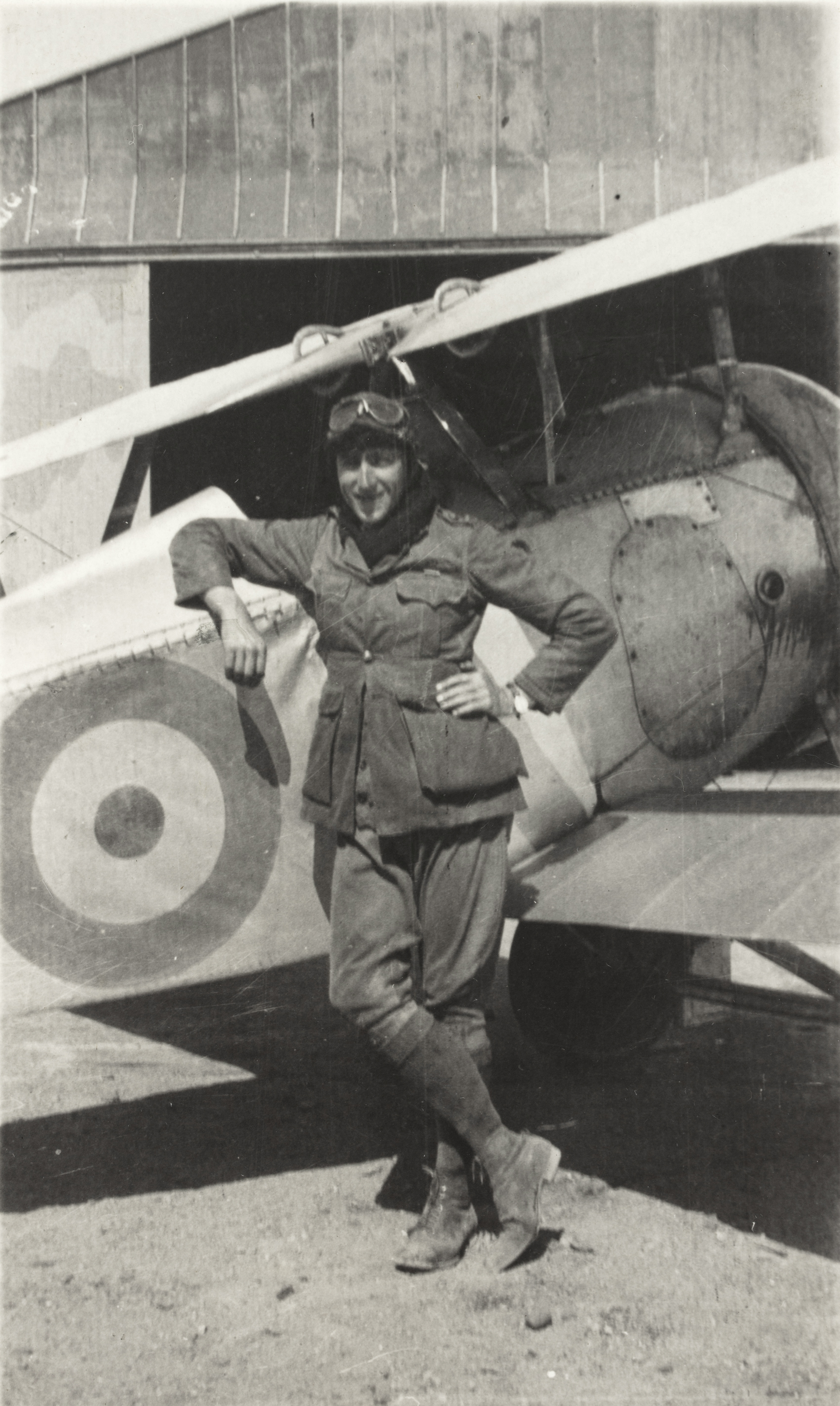
Lieutenant Wilmot Hudson Fysh standing in front of a Nieuport Scout aircraft

On 28 February 1919, at Heliopolis, Fysh received his flying licence, graduating as a scout pilot. In March 1919, an announcement was made by the Prime Minister of Australia, William Morris Hughes, of a Great Air Race for the "first successful flight to Australia from Great Britain in a machine manned by Australians". The prize money was £A10,000 (or £8,000 sterling), under the condition that the flight is completed within 720 hours, and before midnight of 31 December 1919. Deciding to join the race, Fysh regrouped with Paul McGinness as his co-pilot.

To fund the race, McGinness approached Sir Samuel McCaughey, the man who donated the plane that McGinness flew in for World War I. McCaughey agreed to fund the race, and they were joined by Arthur Baird, their flight-sergeant engineer during the war. Prior to the race, on 25 July 1919, McCaughey died and his executors refused to honour his agreement with McGinness. As a result, plans for the race were abandoned. Instead, Fysh and McGinness were commissioned to survey Northern Australia for the preparation of the Air Race, by Major-General James Gordon Legge (later Lieutenant-General) from the Defence Department. They were instructed to survey the route from the town of Longreach, past Katherine, and ending at the state capital of Darwin, in the Northern Territory.

Arriving in Longreach in August 1919, they acquired a Model T Ford, as a transport for the survey, and were accompanied by a mechanic, George Gorham. Leaving Longreach on 18 August 1919, the group traveled through Winton, Kynuna and McKinlay, reaching the town of Cloncurry on 20 August 1919. They were the first people to travel across the Gulf of Carpentaria, using an automobile. The team traveled through Burketown, the stations of Westmoreland and Wollorgorang, before reaching Hobble Chain Creek. From there, they traveled through Big Running Creek, Calvert River, Warbys Lagoon, Snake Lagoon, Fulch River, Werrin River, Fletcher River, Feathertop Creek. As none of the rivers have bridges, the group had to wade across the rivers. Following a route taken by Ludwig Leichhardt in 1845, they reached Borroloola. Fysh began a diary of maps and photography, to record their journey across Northern Australia.

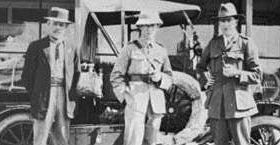
George Gorham, Paul McGinness and Hudson Fysh in Longreach

Leaving Borroloola on 25 September 1919, they followed the Roper River, and arriving at Katherine on 8 October 1919. From Katherine, they took a train, Leaping Lena, to Darwin. In total, the pair had traveled through 2180 kilometre in their Model T Ford, taking up 51 days for their trip from Longreach to Katherine. As a result of their journey across the outback, the group found Legge's route lacking the necessary open space for aircraft landing. Fysh and McGinness became convinced that an alternate route through the Barkly Tableland will be more convenient for the winners of the air race, after talking to some motorcyclists from Sydney.

Upon reaching Darwin, McGinness and Gorham traveled back to Cloncurry to survey and build landing routes on the way there, while Fysh was to stay in Darwin and create suitable landing strips there and at Katherine. In a letter addressed to General Legge dated to 30 October 1919, Fysh rejected the use of the racecourse in Darwin, which was originally picked by Reginald Lloyd (the head of the first ground survey to find a suitable route for the aircraft), as the landing ground for the winning aircraft. He then suggested an alternate strip, locating one near Fannie Bay, to the north of Darwin. Shortly before the landing of the Smith brothers, the landing strip at Fannie Bay was completed at the cost of £A700.

On 10 December 1919, the team of Ross Smith, Keith Smith, Jim Bennett and Wally Shiers, winners of the Great Race, arrived in Darwin and were greeted by Fysh (as the official representative of the Defence Department). Deciding to return to Longreach in May 1920, Fysh met Alexander Kennedy, when he was given hospitality in Kennedy's homestead, Bushby Park. As McGinness had stopped at the homestead earlier on his way to Cloncurry, Kennedy told Fysh about McGinness' idea of an airline service for the region.

=== Foundation of Qantas ===
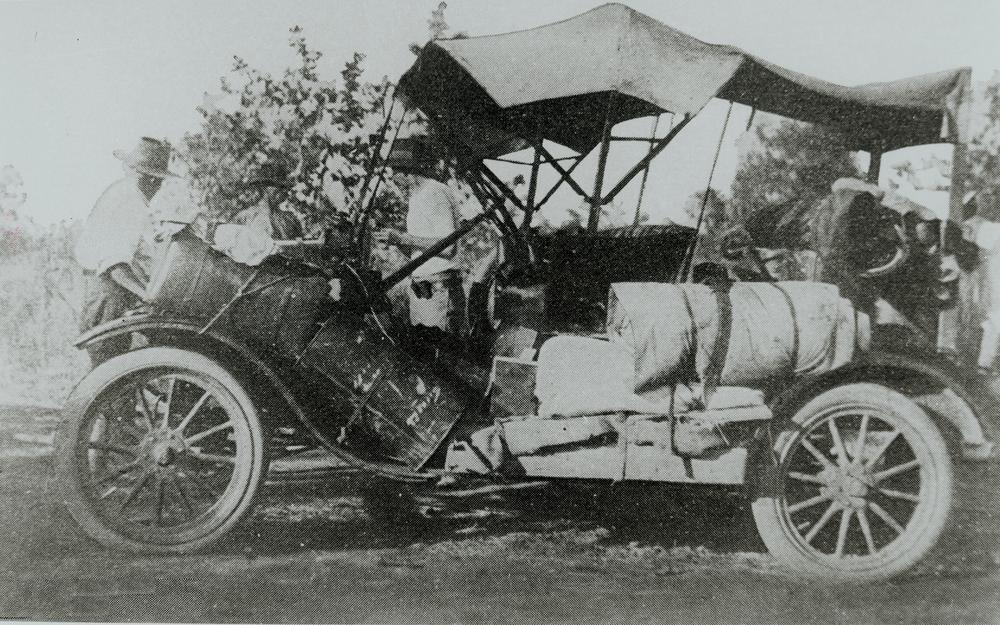
Model T Ford used in the 1919 survey

After reuniting at the Cloncurry Post Office, McGinness and Fysh started to make plans to build their airline service, confident in the future of commercial aviation. Writing about his experiences in the outback in his autobiography, Fysh commented that:

We could not help being struck by the natural advantages which favoured the establishment of an air service in the district... We were convinced of the important part aircraft would eventually play in transporting mail, passengers and freight over the sparsely populated and practically roadless areas of western and northern Queensland and North Australia.

Earlier on, McGinness had met a grazier, Fergus McMaster, when McMaster's car axle had broken down on a bed in Cloncurry River. McGinness fixed the car, gaining the respect of McMaster. McGinness and Fysh headed off to Brisbane, further developing their plan along the way. Coincidentally, McMaster also went to Brisbane. Upon realising this, Fysh and McGinness, explained their airline plans to him. The initial plans for the airline service consisted of joyriding, air taxi trips and charter services spanning the Northern Territory— Western Queensland region of Australia. As a result, on 20 June 1920 in Brisbane's Gresham Hotel, McGinness, Fysh, McMaster and Alan Campbell, an adviser for the Queensland Primary Producers, began to register the new airline company. The registration of the company was not finalised that day. It took several months before a name and the necessary funds were found for the business.

Funds for the company were lacking. Demonstrating his faith in the airline, Fysh invested his savings of £A500 (£400 sterlings), while McGinness invested £1000. After being contacted by the group, Arthur Baird joined them in the idea, once again closing his garage business. A main investor for Qantas was Ainslie Templeton, a friend of Fergus McMaster and a woolgrower in the Longreach district, who promised to match McMaster's investments in the "air service project", upon being told of the idea. Fysh and McGinness then traveled through the towns in the Northern Territory and Queensland, asking for investments for the airline. They were met with positive responses. After observing a shareholder writing "Donation" across the cheque butt, Fysh wrote:

...like others, he subscribed out of postwar patriotic sentiment for two young returned men, and out of the hope that in the roadless and bridgeless western plains, where all road transport ceased following heavy rain, perhaps the aeroplane might serve a useful purpose.

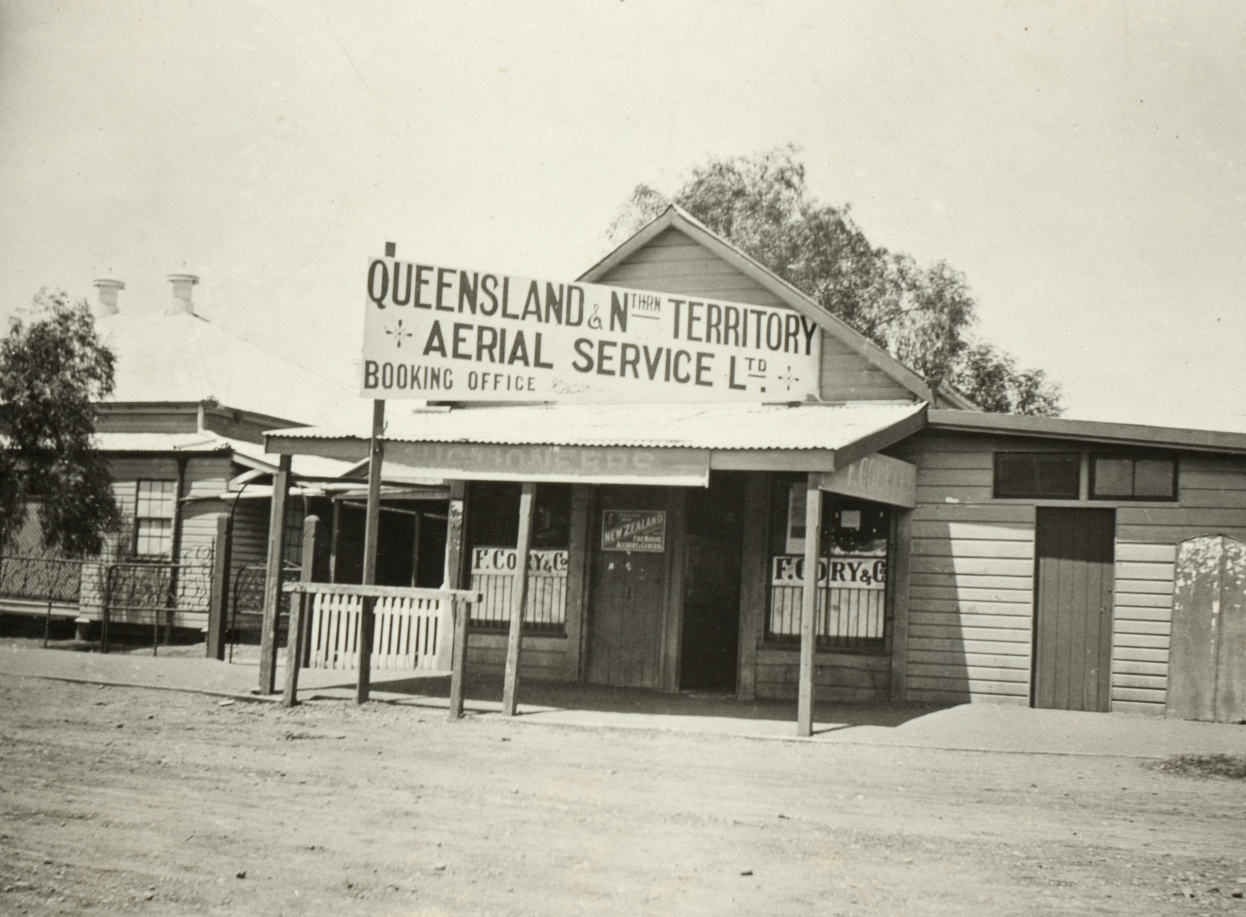
The original Qantas Office, Longreach, Queensland, vintage photographic print, Sir Hudson Fysh papers, ca.1817-1974

After trying many different names for the company, the Queensland And Northern Territory Aerial Services Limited or Qantas was chosen, a name that McMaster later stated was created "with Anzac as its inspiring factor". Qantas was formed on 16 November 1920, with Fysh, McGinness, McMaster, Ainslie Templeton, and Alan Campbell in the Gresham Hotel, with an initial paid-up capital of £A6,700 (£5,360 sterlings). The job of executive chairman of the airline was given to McMaster, with Winton becoming the head office and "the official birthplace of Qantas".

Partially due to McMaster's intervention, the original plans for air-taxi work and joyriding gave way for airmail services, which would link communication in the settlements between Darwin and Longreach. McMaster summarised it as "an aerial mail service from Longreach to Port Darwin, connecting at Winton, Cloncurry, Avon Downs, Anthony Lagoon, Newcastle Waters and The Katherine", therefore making it the longest direct air service in the world at that time. Another plan for Qantas came forth with Dr Frederick Archibald Michod, a doctor and aviator in Longreach who became foundation director of Qantas after its formation. Visiting cattle stations and private properties to give medical treatment, Michod was aware of the difficulties faced in the outback. Establishing a hospital in Longreach, he often used his aircraft as an aerial ambulance. He proposed an idea for a "flying doctor", which would later take form in the late 1920s with the Presbyterian minister, John Flynn.

The airline was provided with a wool store as their first hangar by A.J.B. McMaster, owner of Alba Woolscour, original Qantas shareholder and older Brother of Sir Fergus McMaster. On 7 February 1921, the first and only Qantas board meeting in Winton was held in the Winton Club, three days after the pilots landed, on 10 February. A quick decision was made to move Qantas headquarters to Longreach, which would be more central to operations, with easier access to passengers and spare parts.

=== Qantas first fleet and flight ===
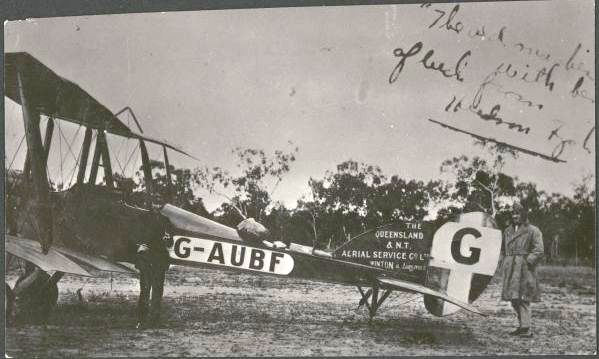
Royal Aircraft Factory B.E.2e biplane from the Queensland and Northern Territory Aerial Service

In August 1920, Fysh and McGinness ordered their first aircraft for the company from Mascot Aerodrome, the first airport in Australia – two Avro 504K with Sunbeam Dyak engines, bought at £A1,425 each. The purchase for the 504K was dated 19 August 1920, and under the name of The Western Queensland Auto Aero Service Limited. The Avro was one of the original, of six, military aircraft built in Australia by AA & E Co. Ltd. upon the orders of the Commonwealth Government for the Royal Australian Air Force (RAAF). AA & E later went into liquidation after falling to their cheaper British competitors.

However a delay in the engines caused anxiety in the pilots, with their financial circumstance lingering. A decision was soon put up to order a third aircraft, with the company considering both the Avro 547 triplane and the Westland Limousine. After initial misgiving by McMaster, Fysh and McGinness finally settled for the Avro triplane. The Avro 547 was bought for £A2,798, and was considered a revolution in airplane technology, able to hold 4 passengers in an enclosed cabin. The Avro had also won a £A10,000 competition sponsored by the Daily Mail for the "best commercial aircraft". Due to their financial circumstances however, the order for one of the Avro 504K was cancelled.

After being informed that the Dyak engine was ready by the owner of the Aerodrome, Nigel Love, on 23 November 1920; they were told that the Avro 504K would be ready by December. However the aircraft was delayed until 25 January 1923, upon which McGinness send a wire message to McMaster stating that all tests have been complete with satisfactory results. Fysh, who was also in Mascot, was left redundant due to the cancellation of the second Avro 504K, until Charles Knight, a Longreach stock and station agent, requested him to fly a RAF B.E.2e back to Longreach. Despite only having thirty minutes of practice on the BE2e during his pilot licence training, Fysh agreed to fly it, with Baird as his passenger. Fysh later stated that "when I took the aeroplane over, the problem of my own temporary redundancy was solved".

On 31 January 1921, 6 days after McGinness sent the message to McMaster, McGinness, Fysh and Baird took off from Mascot aiming to reach Moree before dark. Due to the strong winds and turbulence, the BE2e began to spin, disorientating Fysh in the process. Landing his aircraft on an upside slope of a hill, they came to rest near a miner's cottage. Fysh and Baird soon found out that they were near Red Head mine (formally named "Lambton B Pit"), close to Singleton.

Joining McGinness, who had safely arrived in Singleton, they flew northwards; stopping at Moree, St. George, Charleville, Blackall, and then at Barcaldine, the last stop before reaching Longreach. Meeting at Barcaldine with McMaster, who had caught the train from Rockhampton to the town, McMaster decided to fly with them to Longreach, hoping their arrival in the town would be "impressive and historical". Reaching Longreach in the scheduled time, the flight beat the mail train from Barcaldine by 20 minutes despite the train leaving Barcaldine 2-hour earlier. Mapping the airline's short-term future in the Shakespeare Hotel in Longreach, they soon planned the last leg of the journey to Winton.

With Ainslie Templeton accompanying McMaster and McGinness in the Avro, Fysh flew with the owner of the aircraft, Charles Knight, to Winton on 7 February 1921. The trip of one and a half hours took considerably longer than that, with McGinness steering in the wrong direction, causing them to lose their path. They finally reached Winton after 3 hours of flight, with 15 minutes worth of fuel left. After "landing gracefully" to the cheering of a crowd in Winton, they were "entertained at a smoke concert at the North Gregory Hotel." In the hotel, McMaster outlined the links between aviation and defence, in reference to the future of Qantas.

This commercial aviation company should get your support as Australians not investors; not for the dividends it is likely to bring, but for the great influence it may have in the administration, development and defense [sic] of Australia.

The next day, the 2 aircraft took off from Winton to return to Longreach. With Knight as his passenger in the BE2e, Fysh lost his way, missing Longreach by 20 miles (32 km); he navigated his way back to the town by following the Thompson River. The journey, coupled with the earlier delayed trip when flying from Longreach to Winton, proved to be too much for Knight, who sold the BE2e to the company upon landing, swearing that "nothing would induce him to fly again." The cost of the aircraft was £A450 which was partially bought, as insisted by McMaster, in the form of shares to the airline company.

=== Further career with Qantas ===
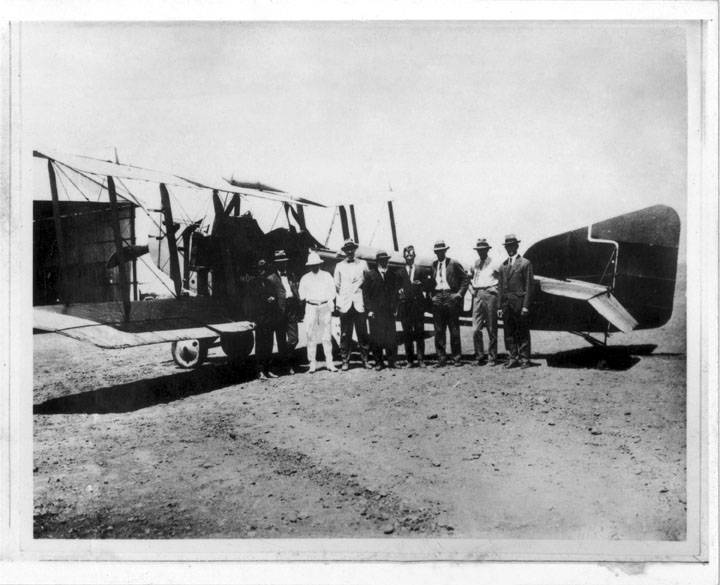
Arrival at Longreach of the Armstrong Whitworth FK8 with the first bag of air mail on the inaugural flight of the first Qantas air service from Charleville to Cloncurry 22 November 1922 (Hudson Fysh second from right)

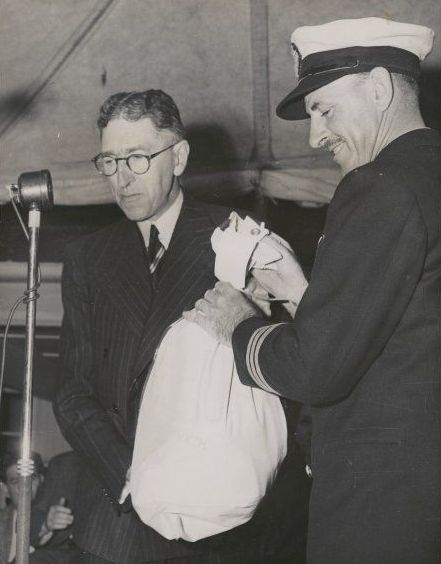
Fysh (on the left) in 1947, opening an airmail route to Great Britain.

In 1922, Qantas was successful in bidding for the second Australian scheduled air route, which was to be established between Charleville and Cloncurry. The route was backed by the government, procured by relations between Qantas and regional politicians. While still piloting regularly until 1930, hard working Fysh studied business and management, and became managing director in 1923. When the airmail route to England was planned, Qantas successfully tendered, with Fysh involved in planning the route in the years 1931 to 1933. The final agreement saw Qantas flying the airmail to Singapore, where British Imperial Airways would take over. 1934, Qantas and Imperial Airways built a new company, Qantas Empire Airways, with both companies holding 50% of the stock. Fysh became managing director in the new formed company as well. He was also a co-founder of the Tasman Empire Airways Ltd in 1940, which later should become Air New Zealand.

Second World War was hitting the prospering business of Qantas hard. Japanese attacks in Singapore destroyed half of Qantas' fleet, the airport in Darwin was under attack as well. Fysh, still an officer in the RAAF, took responsibility for using Qantas equipment in war-related efforts, for example evacuation and supply flights. In 1946, the Australian government bought Qantas for market value. Fysh was the only manager of the company who supported this course of events. After finishing the negotiations, he became chairman of now government-owned Qantas, succeeding his co-founder McMasters. In 1955 he retired from the position as managing director. After controversies with the rest of the Qantas board, he eventually retired as chairman in 1966.

== Published works ==
Qantas Rising, the autobiography of Wilmot Hudson Fysh

A writer of aviation history, Fysh authored many books during and after his career. In the biography Taming the North: The Story of Alexander Kennedy and Other Queensland Pathfinders which was first published in 1933, Fysh details the life of Alexander Kennedy, the first paying passenger for Qantas and a well-known pastoralist, later recording Kennedy's life in the Australian Dictionary of Biography. Fysh also wrote The Log of the Astraea, a book on the Imperial Airways monoplane airliner Astraea and the events surrounding the airmail flights to England, which eventually led towards Qantas' partnership with the Imperial Airways.

However his most successful publication was an autobiographical trilogy dealing with Qantas' history and its role in World War II and transportation in Australia. The first book in the trilogy, Qantas Rising: The Autobiography of the Flying Fysh, is an autobiography of Fysh's life, from World War I and the development of Qantas to the expansion of Qantas into Qantas Empire Airways in the mid-1930s. The book was "one of the very few autobiographies of airline pioneers", and was noted as "much to be welcomed" by critical review.

The second book in the series, Qantas at War, was written about the changes of Qantas and the Imperial Airways in times of nationalization and war. The book follows the dispute between Qantas. Following the positive response from the prior book in the trilogy, Qantas at War was compared to Winston Churchill's six-volume history series The Second World War. Higham (an aviation historian and professor of history) wrote that they (The Second World War and Qantas at War) "are well-written memoirs of the higher direction" and "both leave room for other works which will more mundanely examine the whole of the problems and set the story in its general milieu". When addressing future historians, he states that they "will ever remain most grateful to Sir Hudson for these memoirs".

The trilogy was completed with Wings to the World which was published in 1970. The book oversaw the expansion of Qantas, from the introduction of the Super Constellations to the beginnings of the jet era. Taming of the North, Qantas Rising, Qantas at War and Wings of the World, alongside Front-Line Airline by E. Bennett-Bremner, was selected for a series titled the Qantas Foundation Memorial Book Set. Also authoring a biography on Henry Reed, titled Henry Reed: Van Diemen's Land pioneer in Hobart, 1973, Fysh wrote a profile on the merchant in the Australian Dictionary of Biography in 1967. He also wrote a treatise on trout fishing, Round the bend in the stream, in 1968.

== Tributes ==
As a result of his contributions to international aviation, he was knighted in 1953, becoming a Knight-Commander of the Order of the British Empire.

He received an honorary Engineering Doctorate in 1971.

After Fysh's death on 6 April 1974, to mark the centenary year of Australia Day, he was named in the list of "100 most influential Australians of the century" by the Sydney Morning Herald.

In theatrical productions, Fysh was portrayed by Brendan Hanson in the Australian television mini-series, Air Australia, a documentary depicting the history of early Australian aviation.

In 2002, Fysh was inducted into the Pacific Air Travel Association's Gallery of Legends for "personal excellence, integrity and a lifetime contribution to travel and tourism", the tenth person ever to be inducted.

In late 2008, an Airbus A380 was named after Hudson Fysh in recognition of his contribution to the aviation industry and Qantas.

There is a Hudson Fysh Avenue in Parap, Northern Territory near the old Darwin Airport runway.

The sample card of Qantas Frequent Flyer and Qantas credit card products all have W H Fysh as placeholder name.

== See also ==
- Fergus McMaster
- Qantas

== Manuscript sources ==
- Sir Hudson Fysh papers, ca.1817-1974, Include papers, ca. 1922–1966 in files with a detailed list compiled by Sir Hudson Fysh; correspondence 1912–1974, diaries and personal items, 1917–1973, speeches and articles, etc. ca. 1817–1974; manuscripts of published works and records of Qantas and associated companies, 1920–1927, State Library of NSW.
- Sir Hudson Fysh further papers, 1921-1970, Include articles, speeches, press statements, messages to staff etc. mainly on aviation; and typescript copies of Qantas Gazette bound with printed copies, Jan 1925, Nov 1929, Jan. 1930, Dec. 1934, State Library of NSW.
- Sir Hudson Fysh further papers, 1913-1974, State Library of NSW.
- Sir Hudson Fysh - papers concerning Qantas Empire Airways, 1950-1961, This collection consists of the following 2 series. 1. Chairman's inwards correspondence registers, 1950–1958, 2. Chairman's personal and miscellaneous correspondence files, 1952–1961, State Library of NSW.
- File 070: Qantas and correspondence with Sir Hudson Fysh, 1966-1969, State Library of NSW.

== Pictorial collections ==
- Sir Hudson Fysh - glass plate negatives, State Library of NSW
- Series 02: Sir Hudson Fysh pictorial collection, State Library of NSW
