= Paul McGinness =

Australian flying ace (1896–1952)

Paul Joseph McGinness
- Born: Paul Joseph McGinness; 14 February 1896; Warrnambool, Victoria, Australia
- Died: 25 January 1952 (aged 55); Perth, Western Australia, Australia
- Military career
- Allegiance: Australia
- Branch: Australian Imperial Force; Australian Flying Corps; Royal Australian Air Force
- Service years: 1914–1919 c. 1940–1945
- Rank: Squadron Leader
- Nickname: "Ginty"
- Conflicts: First World War; Gallipoli Campaign; Sinai and Palestine Campaign; Second World War
- Awards: Distinguished Flying Cross; Distinguished Conduct Medal
- Other work: Co-founder of Qantas

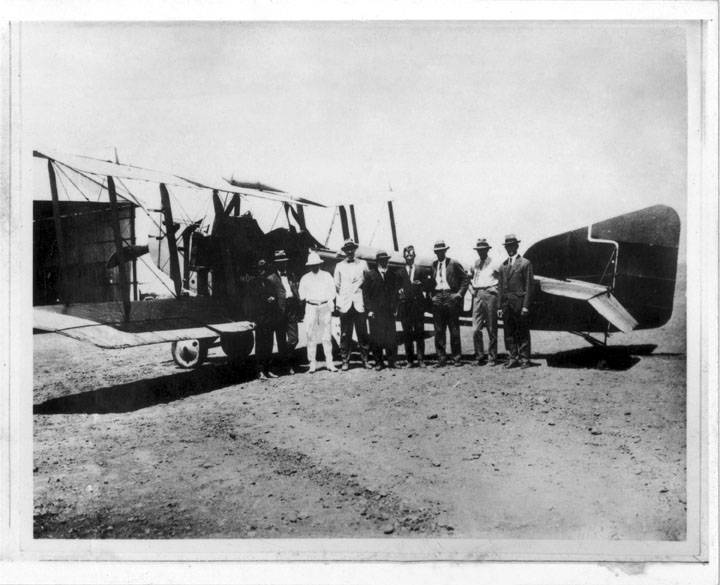
Arrival at Longreach of the Armstrong Whitworth FK8 with the first bag of air mail on the inaugural flight of the first Qantas air service from Charleville to Cloncurry, 22 November 1922. (Pilot McGinness is fourth from right.)

Paul Joseph McGinness, DFC, DCM (14 February 1896 – 25 January 1952) was an Australian flying ace of the First World War, credited with seven aerial victories. He was a co-founder of Queensland and Northern Territory Aerial Services (Qantas).

== Early life ==
McGinness was born on his family's property Riverview at Framlingham, Victoria, near Warrnambool, and attended St Patrick's College, Ballarat.

== World War I service ==
McGinness enlisted in the 8th Light Horse Regiment on 17 September 1914 at the age of 18 and served throughout the Gallipoli and Sinai peninsular campaigns where McGinness was award the Distinguished Conduct Medal for "bravery and devotion to duty" on 22 April 1916. Due to a combination of outstanding leadership and heavy casualties, he rose through the ranks to become a squadron quartermaster sergeant.

Transferring to the Australian Flying Corps on 22 October 1917, McGinness was posted to 67th Squadron AFC, later posted to X Flight and the 1st Squadron, Australian Flying Corps. He was awarded the Distinguished Flying Cross on 25 August 1918 and returned to Australia after the armistice on 17 April 1919.

McGinness is commemorated Mortlake Avenue of Honour (Tree North 54) Mortlake, Victoria alongside brothers James Patrick McGinness (Tree North 56, 47th Battalion, died of wounds, 5 September 1916) and Micheal McGinness (Tree North 55, inventor of the "Trench Destroyer").

== Founding of Qantas ==
Qantas was founded in Winton, Queensland on 16 November 1920 by Hudson Fysh, McGinness and Fergus McMaster as Queensland and Northern Territory Aerial Services Limited. The airline's first aircraft was an Avro 504K. It moved its headquarters to Longreach, Queensland in 1921 and Brisbane, Queensland in 1930.

== Later life ==
McGinness died at Hollywood Repatriation Hospital and was buried at Karrakatta Cemetery.
