= Arthur Baird =

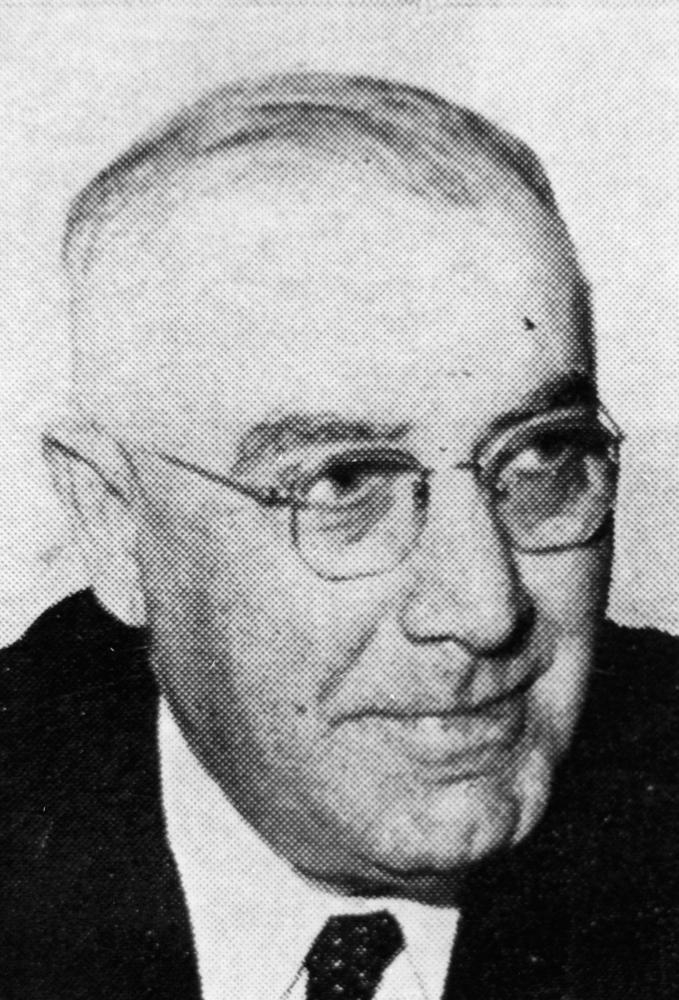
- Arthur Baird, chief engineer with QANTAS
- Born: Wilfred Arthur Baird; 1889; Benalla, Victoria, Australia
- Died: 1954 (aged 64–65)
- Other name: Wilfred Arthur Beard
- Occupation: Engineer
- Known for: First chief engineer of the Australian airline Qantas

Wilfred Arthur Baird (1889–1954), also known as Wilfred Arthur Beard, was the first chief engineer of the Australian airline Qantas. He established Qantas's reputation for excellence in engineering.

== Early life ==
Wilfred Arthur Beard was born in Benalla, Victoria, Australia in 1889, one of 15 children. In 1909 graduated from the Working Man's College (now Royal Melbourne Institute of Technology) with the highest marks in Mechanical Engineering. He then undertook a 5-year apprenticeship with Anderson and Son, an engineering firm in Richmond, Victoria. From February 1916 to June 1919 in World War I, he served in the Australian Flying Corps and, on loan, in the Royal Flying Corps, mostly in the Middle East. He developed a reputation for solving difficult technical problems for which he was awarded the Meritorious Service Medal.

== Qantas service ==
In January 1921, Paul McGinness and Hudson Fysh took delivery of the first Qantas aircraft in January 1921, they employed Beard who, as chief engineer, built a team of expert aircraft mechanics at Longreach, Queensland. Around this time he reverted to the traditional Scottish spelling of his surname Baird. In the early years of Qantas they constructed their own aircraft and Baird supervised the construction of seven DH-50 airliners and a DH-9. As Qantas grew, Baird became responsible for their engineering work at Archerfield Airport in Brisbane and the seaplanes at Rose Bay in Sydney.

Baird assisted the Rev. John Flynn establish the Royal Flying Doctor Service in Queensland by modifying its first aircraft to be used as an air ambulance and to operate effectively in remote inland conditions.

During World War II, when Japan invaded Singapore, Baird modifying Qantas's Catalina seaplanes to fly non-stop from Perth, Western Australia to Colombo, Ceylon (a flight of 3,500 miles over open ocean).

== Later life ==
Baird retired in June 1949, but continued as an adviser at Rose Bay. On 7 May 1954, he died suddenly at his home in Vaucluse, Sydney.

== Legacy ==
A plaque on the Mitchell Highway in Charleville, Queensland commemorates the first regular Qantas air service from Charleville to Cloncurry on 2 November 1922. The crew of three were Hudson Fysh, Paul McGinness and Arthur Baird.
