= Alan Joyce =

Alan Joyce may refer to:

- Alan Joyce (footballer) (born 1942), Australian rules footballer
- Alan Joyce (businessman) (born 1966), Irish-born Australian businessman

== See also ==
- Alan Joyce: Riding the Jet Stream, 2026 book by the businessman
