= Alan Joyce: Riding the Jet Stream =

2026 memoir by Alan Joyce

- Author: Alan Joyce
- Working title: Touching the Jet Stream
- Language: English
- Genre: Memoir
- Publisher: Hardie Grant
- Publication date: 28 July 2026
- Publication place: Australia
- Media type: Print (hardback), e-book, audiobook
- Pages: 464
- ISBN: 978-1-76145-227-7
- Website: Alan Joyce: Riding the Jet Stream by Alan Joyce | Hardie Grant Publishing

Alan Joyce: Riding the Jet Stream is a 2026 memoir by former Qantas CEO Alan Joyce. The book was published by Hardie Grant on 28 July 2026, nearly three years after Joyce left Qantas two months earlier than planned amid controversy over the airline's conduct during and after the COVID-19 pandemic. It recounts his rise from a working-class childhood in Dublin to the leadership of Qantas, and defends many of the decisions of his final years as chief executive, including the outsourcing of ground-handling work that the courts found to have been unlawful.

Joyce said he wrote the book "to set the record straight on what actually happened during my career". Reviewers found it self-justifying, although some considered it readable. Some booksellers discounted it soon after its release, and according to BookScan it sold 2,448 print copies in Australia in its first six weeks.

== Background ==
Alan Joyce was the CEO of Qantas from 2008 until his resignation in 2023. He had previously worked for Aer Lingus and Ansett Australia before joining Qantas, where he became the founding chief executive of its low-cost subsidiary Jetstar in 2003.

Joyce was credited with steering Qantas through the global financial crisis and the pandemic, but the airline's standing fell sharply in his final years. As flying resumed after pandemic restrictions, customers complained of high fares, unreliable flights, lost baggage and difficulty obtaining refunds, and the airline's political influence came under scrutiny after the federal government rejected a bid by Qatar Airways for more flights to Australia. In 2021 the Federal Court found that Qantas had unlawfully outsourced about 1,700 ground-handling jobs during the pandemic, a ruling upheld by the High Court in 2023, and on 31 August 2023 the Australian Competition and Consumer Commission (ACCC) sued the airline, alleging that it had sold tickets on more than 8,000 flights it had already cancelled. Roy Morgan rankings released at about the same time placed Qantas as the 13th most distrusted brand in Australia. Joyce stepped down on 5 September 2023, two months earlier than planned. Vas Kolesnikoff of Institutional Shareholder Services said that it was "somewhat of a shame that such a strong period of leadership is ending in such disgrace".

A governance review commissioned by the board and published in August 2024 found that decision-making had been centralised around Joyce, contributing to "a top-down culture" in which people were reluctant to challenge decisions other than on safety, and the board withheld A$9.26 million of his final pay. After Qantas admitted to misleading consumers, the Federal Court imposed a $100 million penalty over the cancelled flights in October 2024, and a $90 million penalty over the outsourcing in 2025, on top of $120 million in compensation for the workers. An editorial in the Australian Financial Review later said that the scandals of Joyce's final years had plunged the airline into "the biggest customer service, reputational and governance nosedive in its century-long existence".

Joyce's tenure had been the subject of earlier books, including Matt O'Sullivan's Mayday (2015), Alan Joyce and Qantas: The Trials and Transformation of an Australian Icon (2023) by Peter Harbison with Derek Sadubin, written with the co-operation of Joyce and Qantas, and The Chairman's Lounge (2024), a best-selling book by the former Financial Review columnist Joe Aston. Aston portrayed Joyce as an out-of-touch executive who courted politicians and used the pandemic to cut costs and increase profit margins.

== Publication ==
Hardie Grant announced the book in October 2025, with Joyce saying that he was "looking forward to setting the record straight". He later said that he also wanted to "encourage young leaders to learn from my successes and my failures". Some commentators saw the book as a response to The Chairman's Lounge. A Financial Review editorial said that "you almost certainly don't have Riding the Jet Stream if Chairman's Lounge had never been written", and that another purpose of the book and its publicity tour was "to launch a rehabilitation campaign aimed at kick-starting a career as a non-executive director". Joyce denied that the book was a response to Aston's, and said that he had not read it.

The book was released as a hardback with a recommended retail price of $49.99, and as an e-book and audiobook. Hardie Grant said that Joyce's royalties would be donated to The Pinnacle Foundation, which supports young LGBTQIA+ Australians, the Garvan Institute of Medical Research and the Sydney Festival.

== Contents ==
The book details how Joyce navigated events such as the 2008 financial crisis, the founding of Jetstar, the worldwide grounding of the Qantas fleet in 2011, the campaign for same-sex marriage, the COVID-19 pandemic, and industrial relations issues.

The opening chapters cover his upbringing in Tallaght, his early career at Aer Lingus and Ansett, and the creation of Jetstar, which he led from 2003. He writes that Ansett's collapse in 2001 led him to make a promise to himself: "I'd never let an Ansett collapse happen on my watch." In chapters on his time as chief executive, he defends the grounding of the fleet in 2011, a decision he says "was mine because it was a safety decision", and acknowledges that Qantas "made a big mistake in asking for government assistance" in late 2013. A chapter on his role in the campaign for same-sex marriage recounts his being told by the immigration minister, Peter Dutton, to "stick to your knitting", which Joyce writes had an unmistakable "homophobic undertone". In a section on the Chairman's Lounge, he rejects the suggestion that access to it could influence "decisions of national importance", and writes that he has no recollection of ever receiving a call from the prime minister, Anthony Albanese, or his staff requesting an upgrade.

The two longest chapters cover the pandemic. Joyce writes that without action Qantas could have survived "for only 11 weeks", and that the August 2020 decision to outsource ground handling "was Andrew David's alone". He argues that the Federal Court's finding rested on a reverse onus of proof that Qantas could not discharge, and that the outsourcing "was a tough call but the right call". He apologises for saying in 2022 that customers were "not match fit", says that in hindsight he would have waited until after he retired to sell his shares, and argues that the scale of the penalty and the reputational damage over the cancelled flights "weren't deserved". He writes that the Qantas chairman, Richard Goyder, asked him "almost out of nowhere" whether he had thought about leaving early, and that "in my heart, I didn't want to quit". He disputes the 2024 governance review, saying that neither he nor his senior team was interviewed.

== Reception ==
=== Reviews ===
Writing for The Sydney Morning Herald, Chris Zappone said of the book "For an aviation CEO's tell-all, the book is well paced and has plenty of action, and attitude." He called it a "readable, if somewhat self-justifying, account" in which Joyce presents his most contentious decisions "as real-time responses to a grim financial reality". In The Weekend Australian Magazine, Caroline Overington called it an "entertaining memoir" that "begins to falter and, ultimately, to fail" in its account of the pandemic, in which she found "no serious attempt to analyse the underlying problem". The Financial Review editorial credited Joyce's determination and noted his concessions on his share sale, the "match fit" remark, flight credits and the cancelled flights, but concluded that he had "shown only limited willingness to answer the key questions about his mistakes and role in what went wrong at Qantas". Reviewing the book in his Financial Review column, Aston wrote that "there is no real remorse" and that Joyce "serves up a garnish of regret with a main course of self-justification". The Saturday Paper said that Joyce "offers apologies tempered heavily with explanations" and, on some of the most prominent controversies, "says his critics were just wrong".

=== Responses to specific claims ===
The book's figure of 11 weeks had been disputed in The Chairman's Lounge, which, the Financial Review noted, cited Qantas's cash reserves and access to credit; Aston wrote that it rested on "the false premise that costs would remain unchanged". Commentators also criticised the book's attribution of the outsourcing decision to David. The Financial Review called it "hard to reconcile with everything else we know about his top-down rule", and Australian Associated Press reported that Joyce had "passed the buck". Joyce told the Financial Review that the decision to fight the union in court had been made by the board and the legal team, although he said that in hindsight settling "would have been a lot easier". The Saturday Paper contrasted his explanation for the sale of tickets on cancelled flights – "how patchy some of these processes had become" – with the regulator's finding that Qantas had misled consumers.

Aston argued that Joyce's denial about upgrades for Albanese was carefully worded, because the upgrades had come while Albanese was transport minister and then opposition transport spokesman, not prime minister. Overington noted that the book does not address the Chairman's Lounge membership given to Albanese's son, which Joyce explained by saying that he had "never confirmed who's in" the lounge; in another interview, he denied that he had upgraded the son to the lounge. Aston also noted that the book does not mention Qantas's removal of the Financial Review from its lounges in 2023, or of the Herald and The Age from airport terminals in 2014. Joyce has called the 2023 ban a "mistake", while denying that he overreacted to criticism.

=== Sales ===
A week after its release, the book had dropped out of Amazon's list of the 100 best-selling books in Australia, and some booksellers were discounting it: Dymocks' Melbourne CBD store was selling it for $10 below its list price, and a Queensland bookseller included it in a buy-one-get-one-half-price promotion. Booksellers said that discounting was common for new books, and Hardie Grant's chief executive, Sandy Grant, said that sales were "roughly to expectations" and that the book was selling well once e-books and audiobooks were included. In September 2026 The Australian reported NielsenIQ BookScan figures showing that the book had sold 2,448 print copies in its first six weeks, at an average price of $39.35 against a recommended retail price of $49.99, from an initial print run of 20,000 hardbacks; the figures exclude e-book, audiobook and international sales. The paper's Margin Call column said that it had been "flooded with pictures" of the book being sold at reduced prices and, citing publishing sources, that The Chairman's Lounge had sold about 14,300 print copies at the same stage.
