= Matt Chun =

Australian author and illustrator

- Born: Matthew Jones
- Occupations: Artist, writer, and illustrator
- Era: 21st century
- Artwork
- Occupation: Picture book illustrator
- Notable work: Bila: A River Cycle (writen by Jazz Money)
- Writing
- Genre: Opinion
- Notable work: We don't mourn fascists (2026)

Instagram information
- Page: matt.chun

Substack information
- Newsletter: Matt Chun's Newsletter
- Notes: @mattchun

X information
- Handle: @matt_chun
- Years active: 2016–2022
- Website: mattchun.com

The Sunday Paper
- Editor: Matt Chun (and others)
- Frequency: Irregular
- Format: Print
- Publisher: Decapod Press (first issue); Slingshot Books
- Founder: Matt Chun (and others)
- First issue: December 2021
- Website: "The Sunday Paper" – via www.slingshotbooks.com.au.

Instagram information
- Pages: the.sunday.paper; slingshotbooks

Substack information
- Newsletter: The Sunday Paper Podcast
- Notes: @thesundaypaperpodcast

Matt Chun (born Matthew Jones) is an Australian children's book illustrator, writer, and activist. He is a founding editor of The Sunday Paper, which he co-created in 2021.

== Early life and family ==
After his parents divorced, Chun, his sister and his mother changed their names, dropping their father's surname "Jones" and reverted to "Chun", which originated from Chun's maternal great-grandfather, Phillip Jo Chun, who arrived in Australia from China in 1900. Chun also has a Jewish grandmother. He has written that he rarely "foregrounds" his heritage in his activism, due to his view that "identity politics" is often "counter-revolutionary" and that "to weaponise it would be disingenuous".

His name change has drawn criticism in Australian and Israeli newspapers. An article in The Australian on 27 January 2025 claimed that Chun's "real name" is "Matthew Jones", and The Financial Review claimed it was his "legal name".

His sister is the journalist and University of Melbourne academic Mell Chun. Chun's partner is also his publisher at Slingshot Books, Tess Cullity. He has a son.

== Works ==
Chun's books include Australian Animals, Australian Mammals, Australian Sea Life, Australian Birds, Day Break (with Amy McQuire), and the pop-up book Pull It Down. His work has been published in Overland, Meanjin, Liminal Magazine, and The Sunday Paper. His books have been shortlisted for the Australian Book Industry Awards, the Children's Book Council of Australia Awards, the Australian Book Design Awards, and the Shirley Hannan National Portrait Award.

In 2019, he was appointed Children's Literature Fellow at the State Library of Victoria in Melbourne. He cut ties with the library in April 2024, citing political differences.

Chun's artwork has been exhibited at the 4A Centre for Contemporary Asian Art, the S.H. Ervin Gallery, the Nishi Gallery in Canberra, the Casula Powerhouse Arts Centre, and the Wollongong Art Gallery.

He has received a number of grants from Creative Australia, including in 2017 to attend an artist's residency at the Bamboo Curtain Studio in Taiwan and in 2023 to develop a children's picture book about policing in Australia with writer Amy McQuire.

=== The Sunday Paper ===
Chun is a founding editor of The Sunday Paper, which he co-created in 2021 after calling for a boycott of Schwartz Media, the publisher of The Saturday Paper and The Monthly. The Sunday Paper was started during the popular uprisings of May 2021 in Palestine. A particular controversy at the time were calls for boycott of the Sydney Writers' Festival, which has accepted $20,000 of funding from the State of Israel. Issue 2, from May 2022, showed the Palestinian red triangle on the cover. The red inverted triangle later became controversial due to its use by Palestinian militants to mark Israeli military targets during the Gaza war.

Chun's sister, Mel Chun, is the audio producer for the Sunday Paper podcast.

== Political views ==
In 2016 Chun's café in Bermagui, Mister Jones, attracted national media attention when its sign describing Australia Day as "National Dickhead Day" went viral on social media. Chun reported receiving death threats from people offended by the sign.

Chun has called for boycotts of arts organisations including the National Gallery of Victoria, the Melbourne Symphony Orchestra, and the National Gallery of Australia, which he accuses of supporting Zionism, and of media outlets including the Australian Broadcasting Corporation and the Guardian Australia, which he has described as "enemy media".

Chun described the 7 October attacks in Israel as "a courageous act of revolutionary decolonisation". Soon after the attacks, he posted the message: "Power to the freedom fighters. Love to the martyrs. Death to the occupation. Resistance by any means necessary. Liberation from the River to the Sea".

In February 2024, Chun, with Clementine Ford, Randa Abdel-Fattah, and others, published the leaked transcripts of a 600-member WhatsApp group for Jewish Australian writers, arts workers, and academics, along with a spreadsheet containing the names, occupations, social media profiles and photographs of group members and other Jewish creatives. People listed in the spreadsheet and their families subsequently received death threats. The incident was widely cited in public discussions of new doxing laws that were introduced in Australia in 2024.

In August 2025, the Herald Sun reported that Victoria Police had received a letter from a former Victorian Director of Public Prosecutions asking it to investigate Chun for alleged terrorist activity. The police investigation concluded that there was insufficient evidence to press charges.

=== Comments on Bondi shootings ===
On 14 December 2025, 16 people were killed in a terrorist attack at Bondi Beach while attending a Hanukkah celebration organised by Chabad. Two weeks later, Chun published an essay entitled "We Don't Mourn Fascists", criticising public expressions of grief for the victims and the lack of attention paid to Muslim and Indigenous victims of violence. Chun wrote that Chabad is a Jewish-supremacist organisation which has close connections to the Israel Defense Forces which "actively, publicly, and extensively help[s] to facilitate ... the imperialist holocaust of Palestine". Responses to the essay were written by Nick Dyrenfurth in The Australian, by Lillian Kline in the Australian Financial Review and by others on Substack.

Following the publication of Chun's essay, the hate crimes unit of the New South Wales Police Force were reported to be investigating his remarks. Dymocks bookshops withdrew Chun's books from sale and the University of Queensland Press (UQP) announced that it had suspended publication of Bila, A River Cycle, a children's picture book written by Wiradjuri poet Jazz Money and illustrated by Chun. In April 2026, UQP confirmed that it would not be publishing Bila. Several UQP authors cut ties with the publisher in protest, including Randa Abdel-Fattah.

During a federal Senate Estimates hearing in February 2026, Liberal senator Sarah Henderson asked the head of Creative Australia about its funding of Chun's work in light of his comments about the Bondi shooting. In March 2026, Creative Australia said that the funded work had already been completed, but that it would seek to update its future contracts to allow termination of funding should a recipient engage in hate speech or racial or religious vilification.

In August 2026, Chun accused the novelist Richard Flanagan of "ableism" after Flanagan, in an address to the Festival of Dangerous Ideas, criticised the pulping of Bila but described Chun's essay on the Bondi shootings as "stupid as offensive".

== Books ==
Year	Title	Publisher
2021	Australian Animals	Hardie Grant
2020	Australian Mammals	Hardie Grant
2019	Australian Sea Life	Hardie Grant
2018	Australian Birds	Hardie Grant
2021	Day Break (with Amy McQuire)	Hardie Grant
2024	Pull It Down	Slingshot Books
2024	The Pull It Down Reader (with James Tylor)	Slingshot Books
2021	Do You Ever Wonder?	Decapod Press
2026	Bila: A River Cycle (written by Jazz Money)	University of Queensland Press (cancelled)

=== Articles ===
- Chun, Matt (2017). "National Accounts: September quarter". Meanjin (Spring 2017).
- Hourani, Jeanine; Charida, Rihab; Chun, Matt (11 January 2022). "From Safsaf to Sydney: Palestinian resistance and the festival boycott". Overland literary journal (overland.org.au). Palestine.

=== Issues of the Sunday Paper ===
- "issue 1". The Sunday Paper. Other contributors: Writing from: Amy McQuire / Chelsea Watego / Laniyuk / Sara Saleh / Jeanine Hourani / Tasnim Sammak / Rihab Charida / Rose Nakad. Images from: Samar Abu Elouf / Charandev Singh / Matt Chun; Readings by: Alison Whittaker / Hasib Hourani / Jennine Khalik / Ali Imam. Bermagui, NSW: Decapod Press. December 2021. ISBN 978-0645295115. Bib ID: 10176784. Description: 31 pages; illustrations; 38 cm.
- "Issue 2". The Sunday Paper. Other contributors: Writing from Lorna Munro / Boe Spearim / Warlpiri Elders of Yuendumu Community / Palestinians of Moukhayam Shatilla / Nader Ruhayel / Timmah Ball / Omar Sakr. Images from Barbara McGrady / Madeleine McGrady / Jeremy Worrall. Readings by Fahad Ali / Vlada Bilyak / Abla Sulayman Ruhayel. Wurundjeri Land: Slingshot Books. May 2022. ISBN 9780645295122. Bib ID: 10120889. Description: 31 pages; illustrations; 38 cm. Cover: Palestinian red triangle.
- "Issue 3: Resistance". The Sunday Paper. Other contributors: Writing by Nabil Mustafa / Keiran Stewart-Assheton and Jasper Cohen-Hunter for Black Peoples Union / Tara Alami / Lorna Munro / Sara M. Saleh / Leah House / Hasib Hourani / Mu'in Bseiso / Samih al-Qasim / Louis Allday / Husayn Muruwwah / Prof. Gary Foley / James Tylor / Zeina Kilani. Embroidery by Safa El Samad / Risography by Dennis Grauel / Drawing by Matt Chun / Design by Paul Mylecharane. Slingshot Books. July 2024. ISBN 9780645975413. Description: 43 pages; illustrations; 38 cm.
- "Issue 4: The Pitfalls of Liberalism". The Sunday Paper. Other contributors: Commissioning editor: Keiran Stewart-Assheton; Writing: Gurrnoong (Jasper Cohen-Hunter); Steve Salaita; Mell Chun; Derek La Salle; Nita and Jesse Okoko; Tara Alami and Yazan Zahzah for Palestinian Feminist Collective; Elsa Tuet-Rosenberg, Shoshana Rosenberg, and Alana Lentin; Sui Zhen; Drawing: Aliaa Betawi; Yugaamgan (Em Randall); Photography: Ala Kheir. Photography, Gudjerron Club, and pull-out poster artwork: James Tylor; Art object: Clement. March 2026.
