= Bila, A River Cycle =

Book by Wiradjuri poet Jazz Money, pulped in 2026

Bila, A River Cycle (book)
- Author: Jazz Money
- Illustrator: Matt Chun
- Genre: Children's picture book
- Set in: Wiradjuri Country
- Publisher: University of Queensland Press (cancelled)
- Publication date: 30 June 2026 (cancelled)
- Publication place: Australia
- Media type: Print (hardcover}
- Pages: 40
- ISBN: 9780702268304 From cancelled UQP release
- Dimensions (cm): 29.6 x 20.6 x 0.9

Bila, A River Cycle (poem)
- by Jazz Money
- Written: 31 January 2021 (or earlier)
- Country: Wiradjuri Country
- Language: Australian English, with some words in Wiradjuri language
- Form: Lyrical
- Rhyme scheme: No

Bila, A River Cycle is a poem by Wiradjuri poet Jazz Money. The poem was originally released in 2021. In 2022, Money began a collaboration with Matt Chun, an Australian children's book illustrator, to release the poem as a picture book. Their book was due to be published by University of Queensland Press (UQP) on 30 June 2026. However, in April 2026, UQP announced that they had decided to destroy all 5000 of the already printed copies, after accusations that an unrelated essay by the illustrator was antisemitic. Money and other Australian authors claimed the publisher's actions were an example of weaponised antisemitism to silence criticism of Israel.

== Contents ==
=== Poem ===
The text of the book is a poem by Wiradjuri poet Jazz Money. Money presented the work as a live performance at TEDx Sydney in August 2022. The poem is in Australian English with some Wiradjuri language words. During her introduction to the performance, the author explained the most important words, including 'bilabang', which is anglicised in Australian English as 'billabong'.

A short version of the poem, from January 2021, was analyzed in a literary journal alongside work by Ellen van Neerven and Evelyn Araluen. The paper by Charlène Corolleur drew on the work of Māori scholar Linda Tuhiwai Smith.

=== Picture book ===
The author and illustrator began their collaboration on the book in 2022. Chun created a series of hand-drawn illustrations for the book. Money commented on his skillful depiction of water. She describes their collaboration as "an illustrated children's book about the interconnections of care, Country and the actions of people with the rivers and stars ... an ode to [Wiradjuri] rivers, to care, to persistence, to sovereignty". The pre-publication information described the book as the story of "a river that walks from the mountains to the sea to learn more about the people who have polluted its waters" and a "powerful call to protect the gift of water, always and together".

== Illustrator's essay ==
The text and illustrations of the pulped books were not accused of containing any antisemitic content. The decision to cancel publication was made after the illustrator, Matt Chun, published an essay, "We don't mourn fascists: Liberal capitulation and the Chabad shooting at Bondi", on his Substack on 1 January 2026. The essay was a critical reflection on the early responses to the 2025 Bondi Beach shooting in East Sydney on 14 December 2025.

=== Summary ===
The essay begins with an acknowledgements section, saying that the essay was "written in close consultation with members of my extended community", including Jewish American anti-Zionist Amanda Gelender, other "antizionist Jewish comrades", and indigenous people "on three continents".

The essay criticised the public reaction to the 2025 Bondi Beach shooting, particularly the reaction from liberals and moderate leftists. Chun criticised the response to the Bondi attack but did not directly praise it or defend the actions of the gunmen, whereas he did explicitly praise the Palestinian resistance in Gaza. Chun opined that white victims of violence, including the mostly Jewish victims of the Bondi attack, are described as innocent victims and their deaths are given undue attention compared to other victims of violence. He wrote: "White, Jewish settler victimhood demands exceptional, heightened grief. While the colonised are bulldozed into mass graves, the death of a single coloniser must shake the earth." Chun pointed out that 33 Indigenous Australians died in custody in 2025 and had been given comparatively little attention. Chun wrote that the Hanukkah event was "hosted by the Zionist Jewish-supremacist organisation, Chabad" and accused the group of close connections to the Israel Defense Forces and of "actively, publicly, and extensively help[ing] to facilitate" the "imperialist holocaust of Palestine".

The essay attracted widespread attention, including in the Australian Financial Review, which quoted Chun's description of the response to the Bondi attack:

This reactionary effort to perform respectability and avoid accusations of 'antisemitism' is futile ... It capitulates to Zionist framing, intentionally wastes our time, feeds institutionalised Islamophobia, and further calcifies a false analysis of 'antisemitism' ... Avoiding any mention of Chabad ... whiteness, Jewishness, and the backdrop of Bondi Beach were enough to bestow every person killed with default innocence and virtue.

== Publisher's decision and reactions ==
University of Queensland Press had agreed to publish the book and had printed 5000 copies. However, after The Australian newspaper questioned the University of Queensland about its relationship with Chun, the university announced that the publication was suspended. The university subsequently confirmed that it planned to cancel the publication and pulp the already printed copies. The decision was announced in an email from the dean of humanities, Heather Zwicker, who said Chun's statements "do not align with UQ's policies and values, including in light of its adopted definition of antisemitism".

=== Reactions to the decision ===
==== Jazz Money ====
The Sydney Morning Herald reported Money's reaction.

"That's the thing that is most distressing to me, it just sets the most awful precedent for integrity and courage in publishing in Australia because this is a very gentle kid's book written by an Aboriginal mum about my Country and about my family's Country ... If that can be cancelled under this definition, this weaponised definition, then what would stop anything more political or more urgent from being destroyed? What would compel a publisher to defend something that is higher stakes?" — Jazz Money, 2026.

==== UQ and UQP staff ====
Twelve UQP staff members issued a statement calling for the university to reconsider the decision. In June 2026, UQP's sales and distribution manager, Kirsty Wilson, resigned from the press in protest, telling Books+Publishing magazine: "As one of the co-founders of Readers and Writers Against the Genocide, I felt I had to withdraw my labour and publishing expertise in protest at the book's cancellation."

Anita Heiss, professor of communications at the Aboriginal and Torres Strait Islander Studies Unit, University of Queensland, resigned from her role in May 2026 in protest at the cancellation of Bila. At the time of her resignation, Heiss was curator of the recently created Bundyi imprint at Simon & Schuster, focused on commissioning books by First Nations authors. Simon & Schuster is the Australian publisher of Benjamin Netanyahu's memoir Bibi.

==== Australian authors ====
At least seventeen UQP authors, including Tony Birch, Evelyn Araluen, Omar Sakr, Melissa Lucashenko, Randa Abdel-Fattah, Amy Thunig, and Sara M. Saleh, announced that they would cut ties with the press in protest at the book's cancellation and the process leading up to it.

Australian author Randa Abdel-Fattah, one of several who announced they would boycott UQP, described the publisher's decision to pulp the books as "weaponisation of accusations of anti-Semitism to censor and punish voices that denounce and oppose [Israel]".

=== Impact on the University of Queensland Press ===
In February 2026, the University of Queensland's vice-chancellor announced that the university had undertaken a governance review of UQP and intended to implement its recommendations, including "a commitment to broadening the diversity of books and voices" published by the press and the establishment of a new governing board. The publisher had recently promoted Madonna Duffy from publishing director to director of the press in November 2025. Ben Ball, previously a publisher at Penguin Random House and Simon & Schuster, was appointed publishing director in April 2026.

== See also ==
- Bila Yarrudhanggalangdhuray, 2021 historical novel by Anita Heiss
