= Alan Joyce (businessman) =

Irish-Australian businessman (born 1966)

Alan Joyce AC FTSE
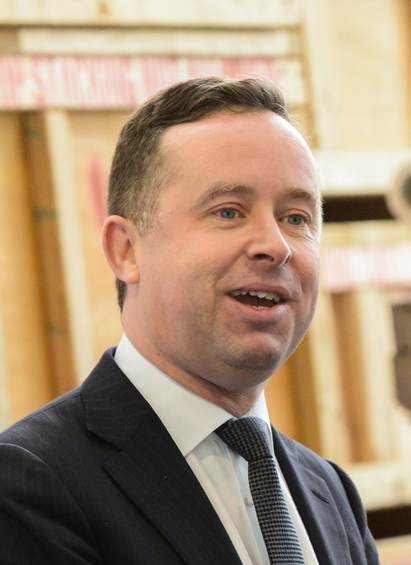
- Joyce in 2014
- Born: 30 June 1966 (age 60); Tallaght, Dublin, Ireland
- Citizenship: Irish; Australian
- Education: Dublin Institute of Technology (BSc); Trinity College Dublin (MS)
- Occupations: Businessman; chief executive officer; activist
- Organisation: Qantas
- Spouse: Shane Lloyd (m. 2019)

Alan Joseph Joyce (born 30 June 1966) is an Irish-Australian businessman. He was the chief executive officer (CEO) of Qantas Airways Limited from 2008 until his resignation in 2023, having previously been the founding chief executive of the Qantas low-cost subsidiary Jetstar from 2003.

Born in Dublin, Joyce worked for Aer Lingus and Ansett Australia before joining Qantas in 2000. As Qantas chief executive he pursued an extended program of cost reduction, restructuring and workforce change. In October 2011 he grounded the entire Qantas mainline fleet during an industrial dispute, an action that led the industrial tribunal to terminate the dispute and that drew widespread criticism. After a record loss in 2014 and a subsequent transformation program, Qantas reported what was then a record profit in 2016. Joyce chaired the International Air Transport Association in 2012–13, was a leading corporate supporter of the 2017 campaign to legalise same-sex marriage in Australia, and was appointed a Companion of the Order of Australia in 2017.

Joyce's final years at Qantas were marked by sustained public, political and shareholder criticism of the airline's customer service, industrial relations and executive pay. Qantas's 2020 outsourcing of about 1,700 ground handling jobs was found to have contravened the Fair Work Act 2009, a finding upheld unanimously by the High Court of Australia in September 2023 and followed by a record $90 million penalty in 2025. In 2024 the Federal Court fined Qantas $100 million for misleading consumers by continuing to sell tickets for flights it had already decided to cancel. Joyce brought his retirement forward by two months and left the airline on 5 September 2023; in August 2024 the Qantas board withheld $9.26 million of his final remuneration following a governance review. He published a memoir, Alan Joyce: Riding the Jet Stream, in 2026.

== Early life and education ==
Joyce was born and raised in Tallaght, now a suburb of Dublin, Ireland. His mother was a cleaner, and his father worked in a tobacco factory. Joyce attended secondary school at St Mark's Community School in Springfield, Tallaght.

Joyce attended Dublin Institute of Technology and Trinity College Dublin. He graduated with Honours, receiving a Bachelor of Science degree in Applied Science (Physics and Mathematics) from the Dublin Institute of Technology and a Master of Science degree in Management Science from Trinity College Dublin. He is a Fellow of the Royal Aeronautical Society.

== Career ==
=== Early career ===
In 1988, Joyce commenced work at Aer Lingus, the flag carrier of Ireland. He held various positions in sales, marketing, information technology, network planning, operations research, revenue management and fleet planning. He spent eight years with the airline, later saying of his introduction to aviation that he "got the smell of kerosene in my nostrils". In 1996, he resigned to join the now-defunct Ansett Australia. He had been recruited by the Ansett executive Lyell Strambi to work on route planning, and moved to Australia at the age of 30. In 2000, Joyce joined Qantas. At both Ansett Australia and Qantas, he headed the Network Planning, Schedules Planning and Network Strategy functions. Joyce was appointed CEO of Qantas subsidiary Jetstar in October 2003.

Joyce is a former director of Orangestar Investment Holdings Pte Limited (holding company of Singapore-based Jetstar Asia and Valuair) and Jetstar Pacific Airlines Aviation Joint Stock Company (in Vietnam).

=== Jetstar ===
Qantas publicly announced the new low-cost carrier, created to compete with Virgin Blue, on 1 December 2003. It was capitalised at about $100 million, ordered 23 Airbus A320 aircraft and was structured to operate separately from the Qantas mainline business. Jetstar's first service, from Newcastle to Melbourne, operated on 25 May 2004.

Jetstar was profitable within six months of launch and had carried more than 12 million passengers by late 2006, when it held about 14 per cent of the Australian domestic market. Qantas separately held 49 per cent of the Singapore-based Jetstar Asia, which merged with Valuair under the holding company Orangestar in July 2005. In late 2006 Joyce launched Jetstar's long-haul operation, one of the first sustained attempts to apply the low-cost model over long distances, using Airbus A330-200 aircraft on services from Australia to Bangkok, Phuket, Ho Chi Minh City, Bali and Honolulu. Joyce left the airline on becoming Qantas chief executive in November 2008.

=== CEO of Qantas ===
Joyce became CEO of Qantas on 28 November 2008. He succeeded Geoff Dixon, who had been in the role since March 2001.

==== 2010–2011 Senate inquiry on airline safety ====
In 2010 the Australian Senate Rural and Regional Affairs and Transport References Committee began an inquiry into pilot training and airline safety. Joyce was called to testify regarding a 2007 incident that had occurred when he was CEO of Jetstar.

On 25 February 2011, at his first hearing at the Senate inquiry, Joyce insisted safety was aligned in the Qantas Group. He closed his opening statement with "Let me make this clear: at Jetstar there is no compromise on safety. The budget airline model does not require it, and we would never accept it. Qantas and Jetstar have different brands, but are completely aligned on safety. We would never compromise that."

On 24 June 2011, The Sydney Morning Herald reported, "Qantas and Jetstar intend to press ahead with their plans to fast-track relatively inexperienced co-pilots into airliner cockpits, despite a parliamentary inquiry yesterday finding against the practice", while also noting that the Civil Aviation Safety Authority had argued that "there is no evidence to suggest that [the cadet training schemes] approach has resulted in any diminution of safety standards".

==== 2011 Qantas industrial disputes ====
In August 2011 Joyce announced a restructuring of the loss-making Qantas international business, including about 1,000 job losses, the establishment of a new premium airline based in Asia and a Japanese Jetstar joint venture. He told reporters that "to do nothing, or tinker around the edges, is not an option"; the Australian Council of Trade Unions described the announcement as one of the darkest days in the airline's history. Three unions — representing pilots, licensed aircraft engineers and ground staff — took protected industrial action during enterprise bargaining, with claims that included limits on the use of contractors and job-security provisions.

On 29 October 2011, as a result of continuing industrial unrest following the announcement of job losses and structural changes at Qantas, Joyce grounded the entire Qantas mainline fleet. The grounding, which preceded a planned lockout of employees covered by the three agreements, cancelled 447 flights and stranded about 70,000 passengers in 22 countries. Fair Work Australia terminated all industrial action in the early hours of 31 October, and flights resumed later that day. Qantas subsequently put the total cost of the industrial action, including the grounding, at $194 million. In August 2012 Fair Work Australia issued a workplace determination for the ground staff covered by the Transport Workers' Union of Australia, rejecting the union's proposed 20 per cent cap on the use of contractors and its claim that contractors be engaged on equivalent conditions, while awarding backdated wage increases and a commitment against compulsory redundancies arising from outsourcing.

The Australian named Joyce the most influential business leader in 2011. Yet a poll following his controversial 2011 grounding of the Qantas fleet showed the action has increased negative public perception of the airline. In 2011, Joyce's remuneration was increased 71 per cent from $2.92 million in 2009–10 to $5.01 million and he was granted 1.7 million Qantas shares under a long-term incentive plan. His reported comments that his salary was "conservative" were criticised by the Australian and International Pilots Association (AIPA).

==== Losses, restructuring and recovery, 2012–2019 ====
In June 2012 Joyce began a one-year term as chairman of the board of governors of the International Air Transport Association, succeeding KLM's Peter Hartman. An alliance with Emirates, announced in 2012 and authorised by the Australian Competition and Consumer Commission (ACCC) in March 2013, replaced Singapore with Dubai as the hub for Qantas services to Europe. In granting authorisation the ACCC said it did not accept Joyce's argument that Qantas International faced "terminal decline" without the alliance.

Standard & Poor's downgraded Qantas debt to sub-investment grade in December 2013, and Moody's followed in January 2014. On 27 February 2014, reporting a half-year statutory loss of $235 million, Joyce announced a transformation program intended to cut 5,000 full-time-equivalent jobs and $2 billion of costs by 2016–17, together with the deferral or sale of 50 aircraft. For the 2013–14 financial year Qantas reported a statutory loss of $2.84 billion, the largest in its history, driven by a $2.6 billion non-cash write-down of its international fleet; the underlying loss before tax was $646 million. Joyce rejected calls to resign, saying: "There is no doubt today's numbers are confronting, but they represent the year that is past."

Qantas returned to profit in the following years. For 2015–16 it reported an underlying profit before tax of $1.53 billion and a statutory profit after tax of $1.03 billion, which Joyce described as "the best result in the 95-year history of Qantas", and paid its first dividend since 2009. In March 2018 Qantas began the first regular non-stop passenger service between Australia and Europe, a Boeing 787 Dreamliner flight from Perth to London Heathrow. Joyce was appointed chairman of the Oneworld alliance governing board in September 2018 for a two-year term. He also initiated Project Sunrise, a program to develop non-stop services from Australia's east coast to London and New York; a Dreamliner research flight from New York to Sydney in October 2019 was the longest commercial passenger flight then flown, and Qantas ordered Airbus A350-1000 aircraft for the routes in May 2022.

==== COVID-19 pandemic ====
In May 2019, Joyce committed to three more years as the chief executive of Qantas. In response to the COVID-19 pandemic, Joyce gave up his salary for the rest of the financial year. In June 2020 he announced a three-year recovery plan involving at least 6,000 redundancies, the continued stand-down of about 15,000 employees, the grounding of about 100 aircraft and a $1.9 billion equity raising.

Qantas received about $2.7 billion in Australian government support during the pandemic. Data published by the Australian Securities and Investments Commission in December 2021 showed that Qantas received $856 million under the JobKeeper wage subsidy scheme, more than any other listed Australian company. Asked on the ABC program 7.30 in August 2023 whether Qantas should repay the assistance, Joyce said: "I would say what money did the government give that's money that should be paid back?", arguing that aircraft charter payments were for services rendered and that JobKeeper had gone to employees. Treasurer Jim Chalmers confirmed that the airline was under no obligation to repay the support. From 2022 Joyce said publicly that Qantas had come close to collapse in March 2020, telling an American Chamber of Commerce event in Sydney in October 2022 that "we were staring into 11 weeks of survival".

==== Ground handling outsourcing and litigation ====
In November 2020 Qantas outsourced the jobs of about 1,700 ground handling staff at ten Australian airports to third-party providers. The Transport Workers' Union of Australia challenged the decision, and in July 2021 the Federal Court found that the outsourcing contravened section 340(1)(b) of the Fair Work Act 2009 because it had been undertaken partly to prevent employees exercising workplace rights. Qantas's appeals were dismissed by the Full Federal Court in May 2022 and unanimously by the High Court of Australia on 13 September 2023, eight days after Joyce left the airline.

Qantas agreed in December 2024 to pay $120 million in compensation to the affected workers, and on 18 August 2025 the Federal Court imposed a $90 million penalty, the largest ever awarded against an employer under Australian workplace law. Justice Michael Lee said that Qantas had "resisted until it could resist no more", and noted that the absence of direct evidence from Joyce had left him with "a sense of disquiet and uncertainty as to precisely what went on within the upper echelons of Qantas". In his 2026 memoir Joyce maintained that the outsourcing had been decided by Qantas Domestic chief executive Andrew David on commercial grounds and that liability had turned on the reverse onus of proof in the Fair Work Act.

==== Service disruption and consumer regulation, 2022–2023 ====
As international and domestic travel resumed in 2022, Qantas experienced sustained operational difficulties, including high rates of delay and cancellation and large numbers of mishandled bags. In April 2022 Joyce attributed some airport queuing to travellers who were "not match fit" after long periods without flying, a remark that was widely criticised. In August 2022 he issued a public apology, telling customers that "when it comes to what you expect from Qantas, it's not good enough", and announced $50 flight vouchers and status extensions for frequent flyers.

On 24 August 2023 Qantas reported a record underlying profit before tax of $2.5 billion, a statutory profit of $1.7 billion and a $500 million share buy-back. The result was accompanied by continued criticism over airfares, service standards and the treatment of COVID-19 flight credits.

On 31 August 2023 Qantas removed the expiry date on $570 million of outstanding COVID-19 flight credits, Joyce saying that "people lost faith in the process"; hours earlier the ACCC had begun Federal Court proceedings alleging that Qantas had engaged in misleading conduct by advertising and selling tickets for flights it had already decided to cancel, and by delaying notification to existing ticket holders. Qantas admitted the conduct in May 2024, and on 8 October 2024 the Federal Court imposed a $100 million penalty; the airline also agreed to pay about $20 million to affected customers. The admitted conduct concerned more than 82,000 flights scheduled to depart between May 2022 and May 2024 and affected about 880,000 passengers.

Several media articles, notably from journalist Joe Aston in the Australian Financial Review, were critical of Joyce's handling of these revelations and transparency from the airline.

==== Qatar Airways decision and Senate inquiry ====
In July 2023 the Australian government refused an application by Qatar Airways for 21 additional weekly services to Australia's major airports. Qantas had written to the government opposing the application. Two former ACCC chairs, Allan Fels and Rod Sims, publicly criticised the decision, with Fels saying it protected Qantas from competition and kept airfares higher than they would otherwise have been.

A Senate select committee was established to examine the decision. Joyce did not appear before it; the committee reported in October 2023 that Qantas's answers to questions on notice had been unsatisfactory and recommended that it be reappointed so that it could take evidence from him and from the airline's government affairs staff. The Senate did not extend the inquiry. Evidence given to the committee about Qantas's contacts with ministers was contested: Virgin Australia chief executive Jayne Hrdlicka told the committee that the transport minister had said Joyce was unhappy about departmental advice favouring negotiations with Qatar, while Qantas's evidence was that Joyce had never raised the air services agreement with the minister or the prime minister.

==== Remuneration ====
Guardian Australia reported Joyce's total pay package had doubled to $24.6 million for the 2016–17 financial year, nearly twice as much as the $12.96 million he received in the previous 12 months. Long-term incentive awards covering the pandemic financial years were deferred at Joyce's request rather than cancelled; about 1.4 million of the resulting shares, worth roughly $10 million, were issued to him in the week before he left the airline. ABC News estimated his total earnings over his time at Qantas at about $125 million and his final-year package at about $22 million.

On 1 June 2023 Joyce sold about 2.5 million Qantas shares, more than 90 per cent of his holding, for about $17 million. The sale had the written approval of the chairman and was made outside a trading blackout, but its timing was criticised after it emerged that Qantas had provided cancellation data to the ACCC three days earlier. Qantas said that earlier ACCC investigations involving compulsory information notices had not resulted in adverse findings and that it had not been aware of the legal action before the regulator announced it. Joyce later said that, given his time again, he would have waited before selling.

At the Qantas annual general meeting on 3 November 2023, about 83 per cent of votes were cast against the remuneration report — a "first strike" under Australian law and one of the largest such votes recorded against an Australian listed company. On 8 August 2024, following an independent governance review commissioned by the board, Qantas announced that $9.26 million would be withheld from Joyce's final remuneration: $8.36 million in long-term incentive shares that did not vest and $900,000 from his short-term bonus, leaving him with about $14 million for the 2022–23 year. The review found that a "command and control" leadership style had discouraged internal challenge and that the company had prioritised financial performance over customers and non-financial risk. Chairman John Mullen said: "It's clear that we let Australians down."

==== Departure ====
In May 2023, Joyce announced that he would step aside as Qantas CEO in November, being replaced by Vanessa Hudson, the group's then Chief Financial Officer (CFO). On 5 September 2023, amid the ACCC proceedings, the Senate inquiry into the Qatar Airways decision and shareholder pressure over his final remuneration, Joyce announced that he would leave immediately rather than in November. In a statement he said: "In the last few weeks, the focus on Qantas and events of the past make it clear to me that the company needs to move ahead with its renewal as a priority." Hudson succeeded him the following day.

Assessments of his tenure at the time of his departure were mixed. Qantas chairman Richard Goyder said Joyce "has always had the best interests of Qantas front and centre". Vas Kolesnikoff of Institutional Shareholder Services told The Guardian that "it's somewhat of a shame that such a strong period of leadership is ending in such disgrace", adding that "it seems unequivocal that the customer brand has taken a big hit under Joyce". Australian Council of Trade Unions president Michele O'Neil said Joyce had broken the "spirit of Australia". Analysis published by the Australian Financial Review on the day of his departure found that the Qantas share price had risen 143 per cent during his tenure, from $2.37 to $5.75, ahead of the S&P/ASX 200's 94.4 per cent, but that the airline's total return including reinvested dividends of 215.5 per cent had lagged the index's 266.8 per cent. Reports of his departure also noted praise for his stewardship of the airline through the global financial crisis, the pandemic and periods of record oil prices.

=== Later activities ===
In January 2024, Joyce resigned as chairman of the board of the Sydney Theatre Company, a position he had held since March 2023, citing the time commitment required by the challenges then facing the company.

Joyce made his first substantial public remarks since leaving Qantas in a speech in Sydney in August 2025, in which he defended the airline's pandemic cost-cutting as "hard and painful decisions", repeated that Qantas had been "just 11 weeks away from running out of cash", and argued for greater investment in sustainable aviation fuel.

Joyce released his memoir titled Alan Joyce: Riding the Jet Stream on 28 July 2026, it was published by Hardie Grant. In interviews accompanying its publication he said "I apologise for the angst that was generated", while maintaining that on the information available in August 2020 the ground handling outsourcing was the only decision that could have been made.

== Honours and awards ==
- The Australian named Joyce the most influential business leader in 2011.
- In 2012, the Australian Academy of Technology and Engineering elected Joyce to be a fellow of the association (FTSE).
- Joyce is an ambassador of the Australian Indigenous Education Foundation (AIEF).
- Joyce was named a Companion of the Order of Australia (AC), Australia's highest civil honour, in the 2017 Queen's birthday honours list. This honour was awarded for "eminent service to the aviation transport industry, to the development of the national and international tourism sectors, to gender equity, inclusion and diversity, and to the community, particularly as a supporter of Indigenous education".
- In December 2017 The Australian Financial Review named Joyce its Business Person of the Year, citing the financial turnaround of Qantas and his leadership of business support for same-sex marriage.
- In September 2018 the deputy lord mayor of Dublin presented Joyce with the Scroll of Dublin.

== Personal life ==
Joyce holds both Irish and Australian citizenship. He returns to Ireland about twice a year and has said that while "Ireland is a phenomenal place", his life is in Sydney.

In 2011, he was successfully treated for prostate cancer. He ran the airline from home while recovering from surgery.

Joyce is openly gay. He and his long-term New Zealander partner, Shane Lloyd, married on 2 November 2019, on the rooftop of the Museum of Contemporary Art in Circular Quay. They had been together for about 20 years when they married. The couple live in the Rocks, an inner suburb of Sydney.

=== LGBTI advocacy ===
Joyce has been outspoken in supporting the LGBTI community. Homosexuality was a criminal offence in Ireland for most of his youth, and remained so in Tasmania when he moved to Australia in 1996. He has said that on becoming a chief executive he was reluctant to be labelled "the gay CEO", but accepted the role of a public figure after young LGBTI people told him his visibility had helped them; he also recalled receiving homophobic hate mail during the 2011 industrial dispute.

From 2015 Joyce campaigned publicly for same-sex marriage, telling an Australian Marriage Equality business breakfast that the change was consistent with the Australian idea of "a fair go" and that visible business leadership on the issue mattered to young people. In September 2016 he became the first head of a major Australian company to reject the government's proposed plebiscite, writing in Guardian Australia that it was "expensive and unnecessary" and would expose LGBTI people to damaging public debate. He was among about 20 chief executives who signed a joint letter to Prime Minister Malcolm Turnbull urging Parliament to legislate. The immigration minister, Peter Dutton, responded that listed companies should "stick to their knitting"; Qantas said it would continue to speak out on marriage equality and other social issues.

On 9 May 2017, Joyce was delivering a speech to a business breakfast event in Perth, when a lemon meringue pie was pushed into his face by Tony Overheu, a Western Australian farmer and Christian. Overheu subsequently apologised for humiliating the CEO, claiming that he pied the business figure due to his personal belief that Joyce had overstepped the line in his gay marriage advocacy and the assailant's response simply reflected community push-back. He was later convicted of common assault, trespass, causing damage to property and giving false details to police. Joyce said the following day that "no attempt at bullying us into suppressing our voice will work" and that the attack had "reinvigorated" him. Later that month the former tennis champion Margaret Court said she would stop flying with Qantas "where possible" because of the airline's promotion of same-sex marriage.

He personally donated $1 million towards the campaign to legalise same-sex marriage in Australia, which facilitated his own marriage in 2019. The donation, disclosed in September 2017, was reported as the largest individual contribution to the "yes" campaign; Qantas's own policy was not to spend shareholders' money on it. He was addressing a rally in Sydney when the postal survey result was announced in November 2017.

Joyce is the patron of the Pinnacle Foundation, an organisation which works with "disadvantaged and marginalised LGBT Australians". For his work, he has been recognised on a global list of LGBT executives. As Qantas CEO, Joyce pledged Qantas would "continue social-justice campaigning".

== See also ==
- 2011 Qantas industrial disputes
- List of Dublin Institute of Technology people

Business positions
New airline	CEO of Jetstar; 2003–2008	Succeeded by Bruce Buchanan
Preceded by Geoff Dixon	CEO of Qantas; 2008–2023	Succeeded by Vanessa Hudson
