= Vanessa Hudson =

Vanessa Hudson may refer to:

- Vanessa Hudson (politician), British politician
- Vanessa Hudson (executive) (born 1969/1970), Australian business executive
