= Richard Goyder =

Australian administrator (born 1960)

Richard Goyder AO

Chairman of the AFL Commission
- In office 4 April 2017 – 4 March 2026
- Preceded by: Mike Fitzpatrick
- Succeeded by: Craig Drummond

Chairman of Qantas
- In office 26 October 2018 – 16 September 2024
- Preceded by: Leigh Clifford
- Succeeded by: John Mullen

Personal details
- Born: 1960 (age 65–66) Tambellup, Western Australia, Australia
- Education: Hale School
- Alma mater: University of Western Australia

Richard James Barr Goyder AO (born 1960) is an Australian businessman and sporting administrator who has chaired Woodside Energy since 2018. He was previously CEO and managing director of Wesfarmers from 2005 to 2017. Between 2018 and 2024, Goyder was the chairman of Qantas. He chaired the AFL Commission, the governing body of the Australian Football League, from 2017 to 2026.

At Wesfarmers, he oversaw the acquisition of Coles Group. His Qantas chairmanship encompassed the airline's post-pandemic financial recovery, customer-service failures, declining public trust and legal disputes. A 2024 governance review identified shortcomings in the board's oversight of management.

== Personal life ==
Goyder was born in 1960 at Tambellup, Western Australia, and was raised on his parents' farms at Tambellup and Broomehill. He boarded at Hale School, Perth, and then went on to the University of Western Australia, where he graduated with a Bachelor of Commerce degree. Goyder played amateur football for several teams in the WAAFL, but did not progress to higher levels.

Goyder is married with four children. His son Matthew played WAFL football for Claremont. In 2012, Goyder's main residence was reported to be in Mosman Park, WA (a riverside suburb of Perth). A 2015 profile reported that he owned a holiday home in Augusta and a farm of 1,200 hectares (3,000 acres) near Toodyay.

== Business career ==
After graduating from university, Goyder worked in various positions at Tubemakers of Australia Ltd., an industrial conglomerate.

=== Wesfarmers ===
He joined Wesfarmers in 1993, and was initially posted to the company's Business Development Department. He was made managing director of Wesfarmers Dalgety (a subsidiary focusing on rural merchandise) in 1999. Wesfarmers Dalgety merged with IAMA in 2001 to form Wesfarmers Landmark, and Goyder initially stayed on as managing director of the new entity. The following year, he was appointed finance director of the main Wesfarmers company.

Goyder became deputy managing director and chief financial officer of Wesfarmers in 2004, and replaced Michael Chaney as CEO in July 2005. In 2007, he oversaw the purchase of Coles Group for A$19.3 billion. This brought Coles Supermarkets, Kmart, Target, and Officeworks under the control of Wesfarmers.

Goyder recruited Ian McLeod and Archie Norman to help turn around Coles, which adopted more competitive pricing. By early 2015, Wesfarmers' return on equity had recovered to double digits. Guy Russo was appointed Kmart managing director in 2008 to turn around that business.

Wesfarmers raised additional equity in 2008 and 2009 to address refinancing risks following the Coles acquisition. In 2015, Goyder said the share issues had proved unnecessary, but defended them as a safeguard during the global financial crisis.

In February 2013, Goyder was chosen to chair the Australian B20 leadership group ahead of the 2014 B20 Summit in Sydney, a meeting of business leaders from the G20 countries.

In December 2014, Coles was ordered to pay A$10 million in penalties for unconscionable conduct towards suppliers in 2011. Goyder described the incidents as "morally indefensible" and outlined reforms including a supplier charter and independent arbitration.

Wesfarmers acquired Homebase for A$705 million in 2016 to expand Bunnings into Britain and Ireland. After a roughly A$1 billion write-down, Goyder acknowledged in March 2018 that the company had changed Homebase's business model too quickly. Wesfarmers agreed to sell the business for a nominal sum that May, after his departure.

In Goyder's final full financial year, 2016–17, Wesfarmers' net profit recovered to A$2.87 billion, chiefly because of higher coal prices and the absence of the previous year's write-downs. Kmart and Officeworks increased earnings, while Coles' earnings declined.

He announced his intention to resign as CEO of Wesfarmers in February 2017, with Rob Scott being appointed as his successor. Scott succeeded him on 16 November 2017.

=== Qantas ===
Goyder joined the Qantas board in November 2017 and succeeded Leigh Clifford as chairman on 26 October 2018. After three years of statutory losses during the COVID-19 pandemic, Qantas reported a record underlying pre-tax profit of A$2.47 billion in 2022–23.

In 2022, Qantas faced criticism over cancellations, delays, mishandled baggage and lengthy call-centre waits. Goyder defended chief executive Alan Joyce in September as "the best CEO in Australia by a length of a straight". He acknowledged unacceptable service failures, but cited industry-wide staffing problems and improving performance.

In August 2023, Qantas removed expiry dates on COVID-era flight credits following criticism of its refund policies. By September, Roy Morgan research showed it had fallen from among Australia's 20 most trusted brands to among its 20 most distrusted. It ranked second most distrusted for the year to June 2024.

In September 2023, the High Court of Australia upheld a finding that Qantas's 2020 outsourcing of approximately 1,700 ground-handling jobs breached the Fair Work Act 2009, because one purpose was to prevent employees exercising workplace rights. Qantas was fined A$90 million in August 2025, after Goyder's retirement.

Proceedings brought by the Australian Competition and Consumer Commission in August 2023 over ticket sales for cancelled flights and delayed passenger notifications resulted in an A$100 million penalty in October 2024, after Goyder's departure. Qantas also undertook to pay approximately A$20 million to affected customers.

In September 2023, the Australian and International Pilots Association and Australian Shareholders' Association called for Goyder to resign. He told a Senate inquiry that major shareholders wanted leadership continuity following Vanessa Hudson's appointment as chief executive and that he retained the board's confidence.

On 11 October 2023, Qantas announced he would retire before its 2024 annual general meeting. Goyder apologised for mistakes and acknowledged customer-service and reputational problems. At the November 2023 meeting, approximately 83 per cent of votes opposed the remuneration report.

An August 2024 governance review commissioned by Qantas found that the board had been too deferential to Joyce and paid insufficient attention to customers, employees and non-financial risks other than safety. Qantas said it identified mistakes by the board and management but no deliberate wrongdoing in the matters examined. The board accepted accountability and committed to addressing all 32 recommendations.

Goyder retired from Qantas on 16 September 2024 and was succeeded by John Mullen. In June 2026, he acknowledged mistakes but defended the board's and Joyce's pandemic decisions as necessary for Qantas's survival and recovery.

=== Other directorships ===
Goyder joined the board of Woodside Petroleum in August 2017 and became chairman in April 2018. He has also chaired the Channel 7 Telethon Trust and the West Australian Symphony Orchestra since 2018, and the Perron Group since March 2025.

== Football administration ==
Goyder served on the board of the Fremantle Football Club from 2006 to 2011, and then in September 2011 was appointed to the AFL Commission. In February 2017, it was announced that he would succeed Mike Fitzpatrick as chairman, with his term beginning on 4 April 2017.

On 5 September 2025, Goyder announced that he would retire from the AFL Commission in March 2026.

Craig Drummond succeeded Goyder as chairman of the AFL Commission on 4 March 2026. During Goyder's chairmanship, the AFL Women's competition expanded to include all 18 AFL clubs, and the league approved a licence for a Tasmanian team.

== Honours ==
In 2011, Goyder was awarded an honorary degree, the Doctor of Commerce, by the University of Western Australia. He was made an Officer of the Order of Australia (AO) in the 2013 Australia Day Honours, for "distinguished service to business through executive roles and through the promotion of corporate sponsorship of the arts and Indigenous programs, and to the community".

In 2020, Goyder received an honorary Doctor of Commerce from Curtin University.

Business positions
Preceded by Leigh Clifford	Chairperson of Qantas; 2018–2024	Succeeded by John Mullen
