= Australian Federation of Air Pilots =

- Founded: 18 May 1938
- Headquarters: South Melbourne
- Location: Australia
- Members: ▲5,137 (as at 31 December 2025)
- President: Ben Bollen
- Key people: Simon Lutton (Executive Director)
- Affiliations: International Federation of Air Line Pilots' Associations
- Website: www.afap.org.au

The Australian Federation of Air Pilots (AFAP) is a professional association and industrial organisation for commercial pilots in Australia.

As a professional association, it provides pilots the opportunity to meet and discuss aviation-related matters. Its Technical Committee is involved in the development of Australian and international aviation safety standards.

As an industrial organisation, its role is to improve employment conditions for its members, including collective bargaining—negotiating labour contracts, representing members involved in a dispute with their employer or in the event of an accident or incident.

== Mission and role ==
Its stated mission is to "represent and promote the interests of Australian professional flight crew and to champion the highest possible standards of aviation safety."

AFAP-represented pilots work in general aviation and flight instruction, crop dusting, aeromedical services and fly for regional, domestic and international airlines. Its representation encompasses all Australian commercial pilots who serve in a professional capacity, the AFAP recently changed its eligibility rules to also cover Qantas' mainline pilots, who until then where represented by the Australian and International Pilots Association (AIPA). AFAP are founding members of the International Federation of Air Line Pilots' Associations.

== History ==
The first precursor to the AFAP was the Australian Institute of Air Pilots and Navigators, which began Sunday evening, 18 May 1938 at the Moonee Ponds Town Hall in Melbourne, when a group of about 40 pilots and navigators, primarily from Victoria, but also from New South Wales, Queensland, South Australia and Western Australia.

After World War II, it became the Australian Air Pilots’ Association (AAPA), taking on a greater role in traditional trade union matters such as contract negotiations and working conditions. In 1948, it was one of the organisations which came together to form the International Federation of Air Line Pilots' Associations, an international body representing the interests of professional pilots.

The AAPA was disbanded in 1959, when its entire membership resigned due to an arbitration system imposed by the government on all trade and industrial unions which was perceived as "incapable of understanding the profession." These members formed the AFAP, which initially operated as a pilots' federation outside the regulatory system of industrial and trade unions.

Thirty years later came the 1989 Australian pilots' dispute, one of the most expensive and dramatic industrial disputes in Australian history. The dispute was a response by the AFAP to a prolonged period of wage suppression, undertaken in support of its campaign for a pay increase in the domestic airlines (which it quantified at 27% plus a compounding amount for future inflation creating 29%, though such claims usually form a starting position for negotiations). The percentage figure was created to cover all pilots from small flight instruction through to domestic carriers as the talks were forced to an Industry wide discussion at direction of Federal Government. Beginning 18 August 1989, AFAP members imposed limitations on the hours they were prepared to work at Australian Airlines, Ansett, East-West Airlines and Ipec Aviation, making themselves available for flying duties only within the normal office working hours of 9am to 5pm. They argued that if they were to be treated in exactly the same way as employees in other industries, their work conditions should also be the same, the position adopted by the Hawke government. The dispute escalated, with Australian Defence Force personnel being used as strikebreakers and AFAP member pilots resigning en masse. Despite the Hawke government efforts to destroy the federation they survived as an organisation and grew larger continuing to represent pilots in Australia. The airline companies directly involved all disappeared from aviation in following years.

== Organisation ==
The AFAP is organised as a labor federation along a democratic model, with direct democracy the preferred method for major decisions, such as finalising workplace negotiations. It comprises various pilot councils retaining control of their own direction. Among those are councils representing pilots working for the following organisations:

- Australian Helicopters
- Bristow Helicopters
- CHC Helicopter
- Civil Aviation Safety Authority
- Cobham Aviation Services Australia
- Eastern Australia Airlines (a Qantas subsidiary)
- Jetstar
- Rex Airlines
- Sunstate Airlines (a Qantas subsidiary)
- Royal Flying Doctor Service
- Qantas
- Virgin Australia

== Benefits ==
In addition to providing employee representation during collective bargaining negotiations and as part of formal grievance procedures, the AFAP also provides ancillary benefits to its members, such as:

- Insurance against loss of pilot's license via a mutual benefit fund
- System of retirement payments called superannuation in Australia, and its underlying trust fund
- Bereavement benefit payments
- Discounts on accommodation, travel, dining and car rental
