= Australian and International Pilots Association =

Australian trade union and professional association for Qantas Group pilots

- Australian and International Pilots Association
- Founded: 1981
- Headquarters: Mascot, Sydney, New South Wales
- Members: 2,370 (31 December 2024)
- Key people: Andrew Marshall (President); Corey Beer (Secretary)
- Affiliations: ACTU, IFALPA (via AusALPA), ITF
- Website: www.aipa.org.au

The Australian and International Pilots Association (AIPA) is an Australian trade union and professional association representing airline pilots employed by the Qantas Group. Formed in 1981, it is the largest professional body of airline pilots in Australia and, as of December 2024, had approximately 2,370 members. AIPA describes itself as "a professional association and federally registered organisation" rather than a traditional trade union.

The association represents pilots employed by Qantas Airways, Jetstar Airways, Eastern Australia Airlines, Express Freighters Australia, Network Aviation and Sunstate Airlines. In international aviation forums AIPA operates jointly with the Australian Federation of Air Pilots (AFAP) under the umbrella body Australian Airline Pilots' Association (AusALPA), which is the Australian member association of the International Federation of Air Line Pilots' Associations (IFALPA).

== History ==
=== Formation ===
AIPA was formed in 1981 after the Qantas pilots' division broke away from the Australian Federation of Air Pilots (AFAP), which had until then represented Qantas flight crew. The split was driven by the changing international aviation environment of the period and a desire among Qantas pilots to strengthen their bargaining position as employees of Australia's international flag carrier. The association was formally registered as an industrial organisation in 1986.

=== Jetstar coverage ruling ===
In May 2007 the Australian Industrial Relations Commission ruled that AIPA could represent pilots employed by Jetstar Airways. The decision meant that coverage of Jetstar pilots would be shared between AIPA and the AFAP rather than held exclusively by the AFAP.

=== ACTU affiliation ===
Although AIPA had historically distanced itself from the broader union movement, in late 2006 it voted to affiliate with the Australian Council of Trade Unions (ACTU).

=== 2011 Qantas industrial dispute ===
AIPA was one of three unions – alongside the Transport Workers Union of Australia (TWU) and the Australian Licenced Aircraft Engineers Association (ALAEA) – involved in the 2011 Qantas industrial dispute. Pilots took low-level protected industrial action during enterprise bargaining, including wearing red ties and making in-flight public address announcements to passengers about the dispute.

On 29 October 2011, Qantas chief executive Alan Joyce announced the immediate grounding of the airline's domestic and international fleet and a lockout of employees belonging to the three unions. The grounding cancelled 447 flights and affected approximately 70,000 passengers worldwide. AIPA vice-president Richard Woodward described the move as "a maniacal overreaction" and said Joyce was "holding a knife to the nation's throat".

Fair Work Australia terminated the industrial action on 31 October 2011 following an urgent application by the Gillard Government. AIPA subsequently applied to the Federal Court of Australia for judicial review of that decision, arguing that the lockout was a disproportionate response to minor industrial action. Qantas reported that the dispute cost the company approximately A$194 million.

=== Project Sunrise negotiations ===
From 2019 to 2020 AIPA negotiated with Qantas over the long-haul enterprise agreement required to underpin Project Sunrise, the airline's plan to operate non-stop flights from Australia's east coast to London and New York using the Airbus A350-1000. During the negotiations Qantas indicated it would establish a separate employment entity with externally recruited pilots if agreement could not be reached. A deal was reached in March 2020, with approximately 85 per cent of voting members supporting the agreement.

=== 2021 Fair Work Commission ruling ===
In June 2021 the Fair Work Commission ruled that AIPA would no longer be the sole union able to represent Qantas mainline pilots, opening coverage to the AFAP as well. Deputy president Tony Saunders found that while AIPA had "performed well" in its negotiations with Qantas, this did not make it the only organisation suited to represent the pilot group.

== Structure and governance ==
AIPA is governed by a Committee of Management (CoM) made up of 40 Qantas Group pilots who are elected by and from the association's membership. The CoM is empowered under AIPA's registered rules to take all actions necessary to pursue the association's objectives, and executive decisions must be endorsed by the committee. The association's national office is located in Mascot, near Sydney Airport.

== Activities ==
AIPA's principal activities include:

- Negotiating enterprise bargaining agreements (EBAs) covering pay, rostering, leave and working conditions for Qantas Group pilots;
- Representing members in workplace disputes and disciplinary proceedings;
- Advocating on aviation safety and regulatory matters to bodies including the Civil Aviation Safety Authority (CASA) and parliamentary inquiries;
- Participating in international aviation policy through IFALPA and the International Transport Workers' Federation.

In September 2023 AIPA made a submission to the Australian Government's Closing Loopholes legislation, arguing that labour hire arrangements within the Qantas Group had been used to undercut directly employed pilots' wages and conditions.

== Affiliations ==
- Australian Council of Trade Unions (ACTU)
- International Federation of Air Line Pilots' Associations (IFALPA) – jointly with the AFAP through AusALPA
- International Transport Workers' Federation (ITF)

== See also ==
- 1989 Australian pilots' dispute
