= University of Queensland Press =

Australian publishing house

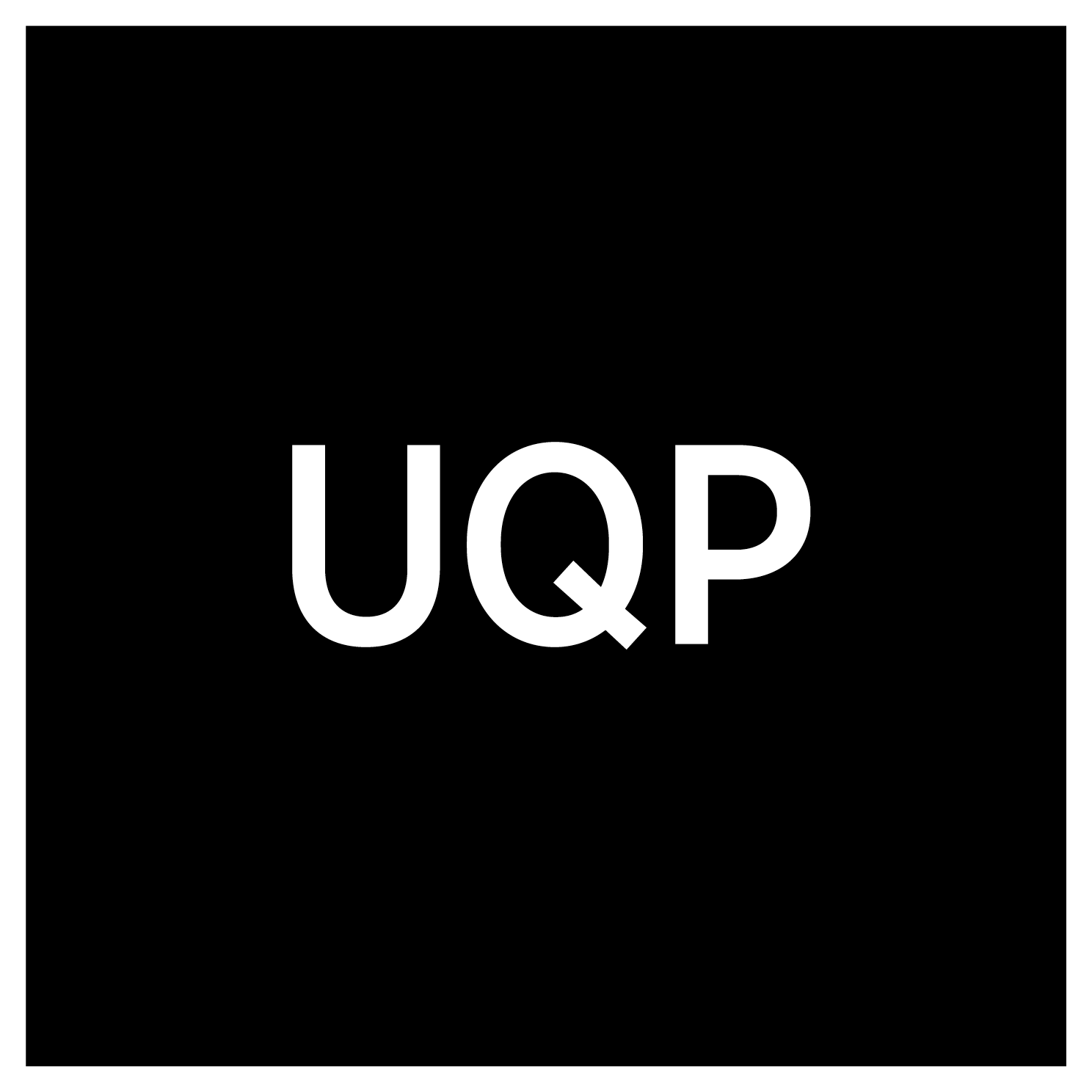
- Parent company: University of Queensland
- Founded: 1948
- Country of origin: Australia
- Headquarters location: Brisbane, Queensland
- Publication types: Books
- Official website: www.uqp.com.au

The University of Queensland Press (UQP) is an Australian publishing house based in Brisbane, Queensland. Founded in 1948 as a traditional university press, UQP now publishes books for general readers across fiction, non-fiction, poetry, children's and young adult.

== History ==
The University of Queensland Press was founded in 1948 as a wholly owned subsidiary of the University of Queensland.

Established as a publisher of scholarly works, UQP made its transition into trade publishing in the late 1960s, largely through poetry and the Paperback Poets series. Considered revolutionary at the time, Paperback Poets was a series of poetry editions established after the poet and novelist David Malouf expressed a desire to produce a new poetry format that was affordable and had mass appeal. Alongside Malouf's debut collection Bicycle and Other Poems, the Paperback Poets series published volumes by writers such as Rodney Hall and Michael Dransfield.

In 1972, during a time of "Australia’s developing awareness of her place in Asia", UQP launched the Asian and Pacific Writing series, which was edited first by Michael Wilding and later by Harry Aveling. In 1980 the Press launched the Leaders of Asia Series, with K. G. Tregonning as the general editor.

In 1990, UQP was the first mainstream Australian publisher to set up a list specifically for Indigenous Australian authors in 1990 with the Black Australian Writers series. In 2023, UQP created the First Nations Classics series, a collection of UQP's award-winning titles by Aboriginal and Torres Strait Islander writers reissued with introductions from contemporary authors. The series set out to celebrate the legacy of Indigenous Australian writing in the publisher's backlist and bring renewed attention to the featured titles.

In 2021, UQP became a signatory to the United Nations' Sustainable Development Goals Publishers Compact.

Today, UQP publishes books for general readers across fiction, non-fiction, poetry, and children’s and YA. As of 2024, UQP is Queensland’s only major publishing house with domestic and international distribution.

Madonna Duffy was promoted from publishing director to director of the press in November 2025. Ben Ball, previously a publisher at Penguin Random House and Simon and Schuster, was appointed publishing director in April 2026.

In February 2026, the University of Queensland's vice chancellor announced that the university had undertaken a governance review of UQP and intended to implement its recommendations, including "a commitment to broadening the diversity of books and voices" published by the press and the establishment of a new governing board.

=== 2025–2026 political controversies and Bila cancellation ===
In 2025 and 2026, News Corporation newspapers including The Australian and The Daily Telegraph published a series of articles reporting allegations of "pro-Palestine" bias made against UQP staff and authors. They reported on complaints made about UQP publisher Aviva Tuffield, who founded the organisation Readers and Writers Against Genocide and has served on the advisory committee of the Jewish Council of Australia, and about UQP authors including Randa Abdel-Fattah and K. A. Ren Wyld. During this period, forthcoming UQP books by authors including Abdel-Fattah and Omar Sakr were subjected to external reviews over allegations of hate speech or antisemitism. Their books were cleared for publication and went on to win awards.

In January 2026, The Australian questioned the University of Queensland about UQP's planned publication of Bila, A River Cycle, a children's picture book written by Wiradjuri poet Jazz Money and illustrated by Matt Chun, after Chun published a controversial essay about the 2025 Bondi Beach shooting. In his essay, Chun criticised the sympathetic public response to victims of the terror attack as "liberal capitulation" to "Zionist propaganda". The university initially said that the publication of Bila was on hold pending a review, and in April 2026 confirmed that the book would not be released. In a statement, the university said that Chun's comments did "not align with the university’s policies and values including in light of its adopted definition of antisemitism”, referring to the IHRA definition of antisemitism adopted by Australian universities in 2025.

At least 17 UQP authors, including Tony Birch, Evelyn Araluen, Omar Sakr, Melissa Lucashenko, Randa Abdel-Fattah, Amy Thunig and Sara M. Saleh, announced that they would cut ties with the press in protest at the book's cancellation and the process leading up to it. Twelve UQP staff members issued a statement calling for the university to reconsider the decision. In June 2026, UQP's sales and distribution manager, Kirsty Wilson, resigned from the press in protest against the book's cancellation.

== UQP Awards ==
UQP established the David Unaipon Award for an Emerging Aboriginal and/or Torres Strait Islander Writer in 1988 in honour of Ngarrindjeri author, inventor and activist David Unaipon, and it remains the most prestigious national award for unpublished Indigenous authors today. The award established the careers of hailed Australian writers such as Doris Pilkington Garimara, Samuel Wagan Watson, Larissa Behrendt, Tara June Winch and Ellen van Neerven.

UQP established the UQP Quentin Bryce Award in 2020 in honour of Dame Quentin Bryce to recognise a book in its list each year that celebrates women’s lives and/or promotes gender equality. The inaugural recipient of the award was van Neerven’s poetry collection Throat, which went on to be recognised in multiple prizes, including winning Book of the Year at the 2021 NSW Premier’s Literary Awards. The recipient of the 2024 UQP Quentin Bryce Award was Jazz Money, a Wiradjuri poet.

In partnership with Arts Queensland, UQP supports the Thomas Shapcott Poetry Prize. Established in 2003 and named in honour of the distinguished Queensland poet Thomas Shapcott, the prestigious prize discovers and celebrates emerging Queensland poets and offers them a publishing contract with UQP. Previous winners of the prize include celebrated poets Holland-Batt, Felicity Plunkett, Gavin Yuan Gao and Rae White.

UQP also supports the Glendower Award for an Emerging Queensland Writer Queensland Literary Award. The award was established in 1999 with the aim to mentor Queensland writers in the early stages of their careers. The winner receives a publishing contract with UQP.

== Recognition ==
Since 2019, UQP authors have won significant national acclaim, with award wins in all of Australia's most prestigious literature prizes including the Miles Franklin Award, the Stella Prize, the Prime Minister’s Literary Awards and others.

In 2021, 2022, 2023 and 2025, UQP was awarded Small Publisher of the Year by the Australian Book Industry Awards. In 2026, UQP was shortlisted for Small Publisher of the Year, and UQP publisher Aviva Tuffield was shortlisted for Commissioning Editor of the Year.

== See also ==
- Bila, A River Cycle – Book by Wiradjuri poet Jazz Money, pulped in 2026
- List of university presses
