= Michael Kaine =

Australian labor leader and legal professional

- Born: 1974 (age 51–52); New South Wales, Australia
- Education: University of New South Wales (BA, LLB)
- Occupations: Trade union leader, solicitor
- Known for: Gig economy regulation; "Safe Rates" strategy; Qantas illegal outsourcing litigation
- Title: National Secretary of the Transport Workers' Union of Australia
- Term: 2018–present
- Predecessor: Tony Sheldon
- Board member of: Australian Council of Trade Unions (Vice President)

Michael Kaine (born c. 1974) is an Australian labor leader and legal professional currently serving as the National Secretary of the Transport Workers' Union of Australia (TWU). Since assuming leadership in 2018, Kaine has been a central architect of modern industrial reforms in Australia, notably the "Safe Rates" strategy and world-first regulations for the gig economy.

Kaine is recognized for leading the successful legal challenge against Qantas in the High Court of Australia, which resulted in the largest employment-related penalty in Australian corporate history in 2025. He also holds senior leadership roles in the International Transport Workers' Federation (ITF).

== Early life and legal career ==
Kaine was educated at the University of New South Wales (UNSW), where he completed a combined Bachelor of Arts and Bachelor of Laws degree. He was admitted as a solicitor of the Supreme Court of New South Wales in 1999.

His early legal career was spent at the NSW Crown Solicitor's Office, where he practiced in community law, torts, and commercial litigation. This legal foundation would later inform his strategic use of judicial review and industrial law to address regulatory gaps in the transport sector.

== Union career ==
Kaine joined the TWU in the early 2000s, initially serving as the Chief Legal Advisor for the New South Wales branch. In this capacity, he focused on the rights of owner-drivers, concrete drivers, and couriers.

In 2006, Kaine was elected National Assistant Secretary. In August 2018, he was elected National Secretary, succeeding Tony Sheldon following the latter's transition to the Australian Senate.

=== "Safe Rates" and supply chain accountability ===
Kaine is the primary architect of the "Safe Rates" model, which establishes a causal link between the rates of pay for transport workers and road safety outcomes. He argues that underpayment by wealthy clients at the top of the supply chain—such as retailers and manufacturers—forces drivers to work excessive hours and skip maintenance, leading to increased road fatalities.

Under Kaine's leadership, this strategy shifted the TWU's focus toward "system-wide" bargaining, targeting retailers like Coles and Woolworths to ensure safe and sustainable standards throughout the transport network.

== Landmark campaigns ==
=== Qantas illegal outsourcing litigation ===
Between 2020 and 2025, Kaine led a high-profile legal battle against Qantas regarding the illegal outsourcing of over 1,800 ground crew workers during the COVID-19 pandemic. In September 2023, the High Court of Australia unanimously confirmed that the sackings were unlawful, as they were intended to prevent workers from exercising their industrial rights.

In August 2025, the Federal Court of Australia imposed a record $90 million fine on Qantas—the largest penalty for a breach of industrial relations laws in Australian history. Kaine characterized the ruling as a "message to corporate Australia" regarding the limits of executive power.

=== Gig economy and "Closing Loopholes" ===
Kaine was the chief industrial lobbyist for the Fair Work Legislation Amendment (Closing Loopholes) Bill 2023. The legislation, which passed with significant amendments in 2024, granted the Fair Work Commission the power to set minimum standards for "employee-like" workers in the gig economy, such as those working for Uber and DoorDash.

== International roles ==
Kaine holds senior diplomatic positions within the international labor movement:

- International Transport Workers' Federation (ITF): He serves as the Asia Pacific Road Transport Chair and leads the ITF's Global Gig Economy Section.
- International Labour Organization (ILO): Kaine led successful negotiations at the United Nations' ILO to have "client pay and accountability" formally incorporated into international safety standards for road transport.

== Advocacy philosophy ==
Kaine is a vocal critic of "algorithmic management," a term he uses to describe the automation of workplace supervision through software. He advocates for "Human Management," emphasizing that the introduction of technology should not come at the expense of worker dignity or direct accountability. He characterizes industrial law as a tool that must be updated constantly to address modern economic shifts.

== Honours and affiliations ==
- Vice President, Australian Council of Trade Unions (ACTU).
- Co-chair, ACTU "Change the Rules" Committee.
- Member, Australian Labor Party (Labor Right).
