= Ali Imam =

Ali Imam may refer to:

- Ali Imam (1950–2022), Bangladeshi writer
- Syed Ali Imam (1924–2002), Pakistani painter
- Ali Imam (1949–1989), Bangladeshi footballer and manager
- Ali Imam Majumder (born 1950), Bangladeshi government officer
