= Road Safety Remuneration Tribunal =

Body overseeing road transport in Australia

Agency overview
- Formed: 1 July 2012
- Dissolved: 21 April 2016
- Jurisdiction: Commonwealth of Australia
- Agency executive: J Acton (2012–2016), President

The Road Safety Remuneration Tribunal (RSRT) was an independent body established by the Gillard government in 2012 to oversee the road transport industry in Australia. The jurisdiction of the RSRT is set out in the Road Safety Remuneration Act 2012.

== Background ==
The Tribunal was established to address the problem of a uniform pay rate for truck drivers, as the National Transport Commission had concluded in a 2008 report that there was a link between driver pay rates and safety outcomes. The Transport Workers Union of Australia issued a "Safe Rates" campaign in response to this report. The possibility of legislation or a regulatory body to address minimum pay rates for truck drivers was first raised in Parliament in 2010.

=== Establishment ===
When the Tribunal was established in 2012, its aim was "promoting safety and fairness in the industry." The Tribunal was tasked with inquiring into the road transport industry, allowing it to:

- Set minimum rates of pay and conditions for truck drivers,
- Enable certain drivers and their hirers to collectively bargain and enter into agreements approved by the Tribunal,
- Resolve disputes between drivers, hirers, employers and other actors in the road transport industry, and
- Deal with disputes related to the termination of road transport contracts.

== Operation ==
Between 2012 and 2016 the Tribunal made two orders: Road Transport and Distribution and Long Distance Operations Road Safety Remuneration Order (2014) and Contractor Driver Minimum Payments Road Safety Remuneration Order 2016.

In the lead-up to the 2013 Australian federal election, Tony Abbott promised to issue a review of the industrial tribunal. The Government engaged a consulting firm to conduct the review, and in 2014 (before the issuing of the Tribunal's first order), they concluded that the tribunal had achieved little, but there was a reduction in truck accidents and fatalities.

The Road Safety Remuneration Order in 2014 set out that employers or hirers must provide drivers with a written contract before they start, pay drivers within 30 days of an invoice, prepare safe driving plans, provide workplace health and safety measures, and have a drug and alcohol policy.

Another review of the Tribunal was conducted by a consulting firm in 2015 with a conclusion that if it was not abolished, it should be reformed to focus on assessing evidence that payment rates are linked to driver safety.

The Contractor Driver Minimum Payments Order in 2016 set out an audit process for supply chain contracts, national minimum payments, and unpaid leave entitlements for contract drivers. This order was controversial and it was not implemented before the Tribunal's abolition. It was claimed that the Order disadvantaged owner-drivers.

== Abolition ==
In 2016 the continuing dispute between owner-truck drivers in the road transport industry accelerated calls for the tribunal to be abolished.

In the lead up to the 2016 election, the Coalition promised to abolish the Tribunal, but was able to pass the legislation before the election with support from crossbenchers. The Tribunal was abolished on 21 April 2016.

Since its abolition, there have been calls for the Tribunal's reinstatement and the implementation of a consistent rate of pay for truck drivers. The Transport Workers Union has continued its Safe Rates campaign.
