= James Tylor =

Australian artist (born 1986)

- Born: 1986 (age 39–40); Mildura, Victoria
- Education: Bachelor of Visual Arts, South Australian School of Art; Honours in Fine Arts, Tasmanian School of Art; Master's in Visual Arts and Design, South Australian School of Art
- Known for: Landscape photography along with other artistic elements
- Notable work: Warpulyainthi (Colonial Slavery in South Australia) (2022)
- Movement: Australian contemporary art

James Tylor (born 1986) is an Indigenous Australian multi-disciplinary artist. He is known for using landscape photography along with elements to indicate Aboriginal Australians' history and culture as affected by the colonisation of Australia, in particular that of his Kaurna ancestors. An exhibition of his work entitled Turrangka...in the shadows has been exhibited at a number of venues around Australia since May 2023, finishing at the Art Gallery of South Australia in November 2026.

== Early life and education ==
James Tylor was born in 1986 in Mildura, Victoria. His ancestry is Kaurna (the Aboriginal people of the Adelaide plains, South Australia), European, and Māori (New Zealand). As a young child he lived in Menindee, far west New South Wales, before moving Kununurra and Derby in the Kimberley region of Western Australia as a teenager.

From 2003 to 2008, Tylor trained and worked as a carpenter in the Kimberley region of Western Australia and Denmark in Europe, before deciding to learn photography.

He earned a Bachelor of Visual Arts (Photography) from the South Australian School of Art in Adelaide, completing Honours in Fine Arts (Photography) at the Tasmanian School of Art in Hobart in 2012. In 2013 he returned to Adelaide, where he completed a master's in visual arts and design (Photography) at the South Australian School of Art. He continues to research Indigenous and European colonial history, in particular South Australian and Kaurna history.

In 2023 Tylor began working on a PhD about northern Kaurna place names at the University of South Australia.

== Career and art practice ==
The 2017 work The Forgotten Wars was a collaborative work created with drawings in coloured pencil by Laura Willis on landscape photographs by Tylor on five sheets. The work references atrocities committed against Aboriginal people by the British Government from 1788 to 1930.

In 2020 Tylor created a series titled We Call This Place... Kaurna Yarta, comprising Kaurna place-names were laid over photographs depicting places on Kaurna land.

In 2021, Tylor and Rebecca Selleck created a series Inhabiting (new), which was expanded the following year into Warpulyainthi (Colonial Slavery in South Australia), which was exhibited as part of the 2022 Adelaide Biennial at the Art Gallery of South Australia (AGSA). This series comprised interior design objects, which include storage vessels, a dining table, meat safe, and butter churn made from various types of eucalyptus wood from southeastern Australia, as well as a suite of photographs titled Warpulyainthi, 2021. Warpulyainthi" means to serve or work, and is intended to refer to Indigenous people's subjugation in the colony of South Australia. The colonial artefacts are decorated with Kaurna symbols, and the installation includes bronze sculptures of dead native parrots and pigeons, quandong seeds, chocolate lily, and geraniums, highlighting the disruption and displacement of people and plants by colonial settlers. The "slavery" refers to the condition of Aboriginal people in the so-called "free" colony of South Australia, who were given only food and lodging in recompense for their work in colonists' homes and on farms and missions, from the earliest days of the colony right through to the 1950s.

Other works include:

- From an Untouched Landscape (multiple series, 2013–18)
- Whalers, Sealers and Land Stealers (2014), which reflects on the conflict between Gunditjmara people and European settlers in Victoria
- Turalayinthi Yarta (a Kaurna phrase approximating "to see yourself in the landscape"; 2017), photographs taken along the Heysen Trail, overlaid with Nunga designs in charcoal, ochre, and clay
- Karrawirra Yarta (River Red Gum Country) (daguerreotype, 2017)

=== Themes, techniques, and appraisal ===
Tylor is a multi-disciplinary artist. He uses and combines a number of different photographic techniques, including daguerreotype, wet-plate, and digital methods, and also uses these photographs in combination with carved, engraved, and cast sculptures, and collage. He incorporates research and his experience of curation into his art.

He addresses "the ongoing impacts of settler-colonisation within Australia that exist culturally, politically and environmentally" in his work. According to Jessyca Hutchens (2023), "While steeped in historical pasts, Tylor's practice is very much about living culture". His work often uses the genre of landscape photography, superimposed with an Indigenous re-imagining of the scene. The Art Gallery of South Australia's curator of contemporary art, Leigh Robb, calls Tylor a "decoloniser", saying that his work "critically question[s] Australia's history of settlement and its effects on the cultural identity of its First Peoples".

== Other activities ==
In 2020 Tylor, in collaboration with Australian author and illustrator Matt Chun, launched a history project called UnMonumental, first on Instagram and later on Substack The idea was inspired by prime minister Scott Morrison (since withdrawn) assertion that "there was no slavery in Australia", and began with weekly postings which included topics such as the 19th-century pearling industry in Australia, pre-European trade networks between Makassan seafarers and Aboriginal nations, the practice of coerced labour known a "blackbirding" in the sugar cane industry, and the frontier wars with the Barngarla people near Port Lincoln. Their information was cited on a website of the same name, and the pair also collaborated on a book titled The Pull it Down Reader, published in 2024 by Slingshot Books.

Tylor has also worked on food-related projects, creating and publishing new recipes using both Indigenous and non-Indigenous ingredients and histories. In 2023 he published a selection of recipes called Mai: Kaurna Contemporary Food on his website.

He has curated a number of exhibitions since 2012. In January 2020, he co-curated kipli paywuta lumi at Mona Foma in Launceston, Tasmania in which audiences could experience Palawa/Pakana culture and food. In 2026 he curated Irrapinarna : Young Kaurna Warriors, at Nexus Arts in Adelaide.

== Recognition and awards ==
Tylor has been a finalist in many awards, including many times in the Bowness Photography Prize, and won several. Some of the most significant include:

- 2017: Finalist, Ramsay Art Prize, for Karrawirra Yerta (River Red Gum Country)
- 2018: Co-winner, Fleurieu Art Prize, with Laura Willis, for their collaborative work Hidden Landscapes: Kangaroo Island
- 2018: Co-winner, National Works on Paper, with Laura Willis, for The Forgotten Wars
- 2023: Subject of an article profiling his work in the contemporary art magazine Artist Profile
- 2025: Winner, Tatiara Art Prize, Walkway Gallery, Bordertown

== Exhibitions ==
Tylor's work has been exhibited since 2009.

In August 2018, Tylor's work was exhibited at GAG Projects, Kent Town, as part of the SALA Festival.

In March to June 2022, AGSA exhibited Tylor and Selleck's Warpulyainthi (Colonial Slavery in South Australia) as part of the Adelaide Biennial, titled Free/State. This was their third collaboration.

The exhibition Turrangka...in the shadows, a selection of Tylor's work curated by Leigh Robb, has been exhibited at a number of venues since May 2023, starting at UNSW Galleries in Sydney, and touring to the Centre for Contemporary Photography in Melbourne; Goulburn Regional Art Gallery, in Goulburn, NSW; Mornington Peninsula Regional Gallery, in Mornington, Victoria; John Curtin Gallery in Perth, WA; and finishing at AGSA (31 July to 1 November 2026).

From July until 13 September 2026, a collaborative work between Tylor and Kyra Mancktelow is being exhibited in Thread: Connecting Stories and Community in the National Portrait Gallery.

From 29 October to 1 November 2026, his work will feature in Art Toronto '25 in Toronto, Canada, along with art of the Wendat, Anishinaabe, and Haudenosaunee nations. Upcoming exhibitions featuring Tylor's work are scheduled through 2027 around Australia.

== Collections ==
Tylor's works are held in the following collections:

- Artbank
- Art Gallery of New South Wales
- Art Gallery of South Australia
- Art Gallery of Western Australia
- Embassy of Australia, Washington, D.C., US
- Kluge-Ruhe Aboriginal Art Collection, University of Virginia, US
- Monash University Museum of Art
- Museum of Australian Photography
- National Gallery of Australia
- National Gallery of Victoria
- Shepparton Art Museum
