= John Mullen (Australian executive) =

Australian corporate executive (born 1955)

John Mullen AM

Chairman of Qantas
- Incumbent
- Assumed office 26 October 2024
- Preceded by: Richard Goyder

Personal details
- Born: 1955 (age 70–71) England

John Mullen (born 1955) is an Australian businessman and corporate executive who is the current chairman of Qantas, since October 2024.

== Early life and education ==
Mullen was born in England in 1955. He earned a bachelor's degree in Hotel and Catering Management from the University of Surrey.

== Career ==
Mullen began his career in various international transportation and logistics companies. From 1990 to 1994, Mullen began in the corporate world as the chief executive officer of TNT Express Worldwide, based in the Netherlands. From 2005 to 2009, he served as DHL's executive officer, before moving to Asciano between 2011 and 2016.

Between 2016 and 2023, he served as the chairman of Telstra. In this role he attempted to address the reputation of the telecommunications company after significant backlash at the services the company provided. According to the Australian Financial Review, complaints had declined by 70% whilst he was chairman.

In July 2024, Mullen joined the board of Qantas. In October of that same year, he became chairman, following Richard Goyder's retirement. Upon the decision to elect Mullen as chairman, the Transport Workers' Union (TWU) hailed the appointment as a positive direction and calling it a "glimmer of hope" for workers. Since becoming chairman, Mullen has promised to move Qantas away from an advocacy position on social issues, to one based more on corporate responsibility and political neutrality.

Apart from Mullen's executive and corporate positions, he has worked in various roles at the US National Foreign Trade Council in Washington, as well as being a member of the UNICEF Task Force on Workplace Gender Discrimination and Harassment between 2018 and 2019.

Mullen was appointed a Member of the Order of Australia (AM) in the 2020 Australia Day Honours for "significant service to business, and to the community". In 2015 Mullen became chair of the Australian National Maritime Foundation and he has been a councillor of the Australian National Maritime Museum (ANMM) from 2016. In 2026, with his wife Jacqui he donated a significant collection of early Australian maritime artefacts to the ANMM.

Business positions
Preceded by Richard Goyder	Chairperson of Qantas; 2024 – present	Incumbent
