= Geoff Dixon =

Australian corporate executive

Geoffrey Dixon
- Born: 1939 (age 86–87); Wagga Wagga, New South Wales, Australia
- Occupations: Former CEO and managing director of Qantas

Geoffrey James Dixon (born 1939) is an Australian corporate executive and former CEO and managing director of Qantas.

== Qantas ==
Geoff Dixon was appointed chief executive officer and managing director of Qantas in March 2001. He was chief executive designate from November 2000, after serving as deputy CEO since November 1998. He was appointed to the board of directors in August 2000. Dixon is a member of the Qantas Safety, Environment and Security Committee and a director of several controlled entities within the Qantas Group.

Geoff Dixon's tenure as CEO of Qantas coincided with a period when the aviation industry was under pressure to remain competitive, with rising fuel and insurance costs. He controversially outsourced a range of business activities to offshore areas, including in-flight and IT services. He also established the low-cost carrier Jetstar to compete with Virgin Blue.

Dixon retired from Qantas and the Qantas board on 28 November 2008. He was succeeded as CEO by Alan Joyce.

== Current directorships ==
Geoff Dixon is a director of the following companies:

- Publishing & Broadcasting Limited
- Fiji Airways

He is the former chairman of the Garvan Research Foundation, the marketing and fundraising arm of the Garvan Institute of Medical Research.

== Former appointments ==
Dixon is a former director of Leighton Holdings. Before joining Qantas, Dixon was director of marketing and industry sales at Ansett Australia and general manager of marketing and corporate affairs at Australian Airlines.

== News ==
He was featured on the cover story in the Australian Financial Review magazine on 30 March 2007.

Business positions
Preceded by James Strong	Chief Executive Officer of Qantas; 2001–2008	Succeeded by Alan Joyce
