= Leigh Clifford =

Australian businessman and executive

Leigh Clifford AC

Chairman of Qantas
- In office 14 November 2007 – 26 October 2018
- Preceded by: Margaret Jackson
- Succeeded by: Richard Goyder

Personal details
- Born: 1948 (age 77–78) South Australia, Australia
- Education: Anglican Church Grammar School
- Alma mater: University of Melbourne
- Occupation: Businessman

Richard Leigh Clifford AC (born 1948) is an Australian businessman and corporate executive who served as Chairman of Qantas from 2007 to 2018. Clifford was appointed Chairman at the company's November 2007 Annual General Meeting, succeeding Margaret Jackson. He is also Chairman of Bechtel Australia.

== Early life and education ==
Clifford was educated at the Anglican Church Grammar School and the University of Melbourne, where he graduated with Bachelor of Engineering (Mining) and Master of Engineering Science degrees.

== Career ==
His career with the Rio Tinto Group, starting as a mining engineer and retiring as chief executive, spanned 37 years and included time both in Australia and overseas.

Clifford was the chief executive officer of the Rio Tinto Group from April 2000 to April 2007. He succeeded Peter Costello as the number-one ticketholder for the Essendon Football Club in March 2008. However he was, in turn, replaced by Lindsay Tanner in September 2009. Clifford also served as chairman of the Murdoch Children's Research Institute.

On 28 June 2018, Clifford announced his intention to resign as Chairman of Qantas. Former Wesfarmers CEO Richard Goyder replaced Clifford as Chairman in October 2018.

== Honours ==
Clifford was appointed Officer of the Order of Australia (AO) in the 2008 Australia Day Honours for "service to business through executive roles in the mining industry, to the promotion of international trade and the development of export markets, and to the arts". In June 2022, in the 2022 Queen's Birthday Honours, Clifford was promoted to Companion of the Order of Australia (AC) for "eminent service to business in the aviation, arts and education sectors, to the community through charitable support and scholarships, and for philanthropic contributions".

Clifford was awarded a Doctor of Laws (honoris causa) by the University of Melbourne in February 2022.

== Personal life ==
Clifford currently resides in Melbourne, Australia. He is married and has two daughters.

Business positions
Preceded by Margaret Jackson	Chairperson of Qantas; 2007–2018	Succeeded by Richard Goyder
