= 1989 Australian pilots' dispute =

Failed campaign for pilot pay increase

The 1989 Australian pilots' dispute was one of the most expensive and dramatic industrial disputes in Australia's history. It was co-ordinated by the Australian Federation of Air Pilots (AFAP) after a prolonged period of wage suppression, to support its campaign for a 29.5% pay increase.

The dispute began impacting the public on 18 August 1989 with pilots working "9-5" and was never formally resolved due to the mass resignation of pilots, cancellation of their award and de-recognition of their union.

As part of this campaign, AFAP pilots imposed on their employers (Ansett Australia, East-West, Ipec and Australian Airlines) a limitation on the hours they were prepared to work, arguing that if they were to be treated in exactly the same way as other employee groups (the stance adopted by the government), their work conditions should also be the same. This initially took the form of making themselves available for flying duties only within the normal office working hours of 9 am to 5 pm.

The dispute severely disrupted domestic air travel in Australia and had a major detrimental impact on the tourism industry and many other businesses. A few days earlier, Labor Prime Minister Bob Hawke declared a national emergency and allowed Royal Australian Air Force (RAAF) planes and pilots and overseas aircraft and pilots to provide services. The RAAF provided limited domestic air services to ease the impact of the dispute. The employers recruited new pilots from overseas, and for a while, some overseas airlines operated charter Boeing 737 and 757 aircraft on east coast routes, and travel between Perth and the East Coast was also possible via Singapore, using international flights. The dispute was superficially resolved after the mass resignation of a significant number of domestic airline pilots to avoid litigation from the employers.

The RAAF ceased 'public transport operations' on 15 December 1989, by 31 December 1989 regular leasing of seats on international flights ceased and, by 12 January 1990, the government ceased its waiver of landing charges. The airlines were able to slowly return to normal schedules as they hired replacement pilots. Thus no specific date can be set for when the dispute stopped impacting flights, tourism and the economy.

Ansett, Australian Airlines, East-West and Ipec no longer exist. East-West was a subsidiary of Ansett in 1989, and was absorbed fully in 1993. Australian Airlines merged with Qantas in 1992. Ipec was acquired by Toll Holdings in 1998. The dispute crippled the Australian Federation of Air Pilots and cleared the road to airline industry deregulation.

== Legacy ==
The dispute was listed as a contributing factor in the closure of Pearl Coast Zoological Gardens in Broome, Western Australia, which relied on domestic tourism.

The dispute led to the withdrawal of the Perth Breakers basketball team midway through the 1989 WNBL season.

== Other reading ==
- An account written by an ex-pilot who was involved in the dispute
