= 2011 Qantas industrial disputes =

Disputes between the Australian airline Qantas and trade unions

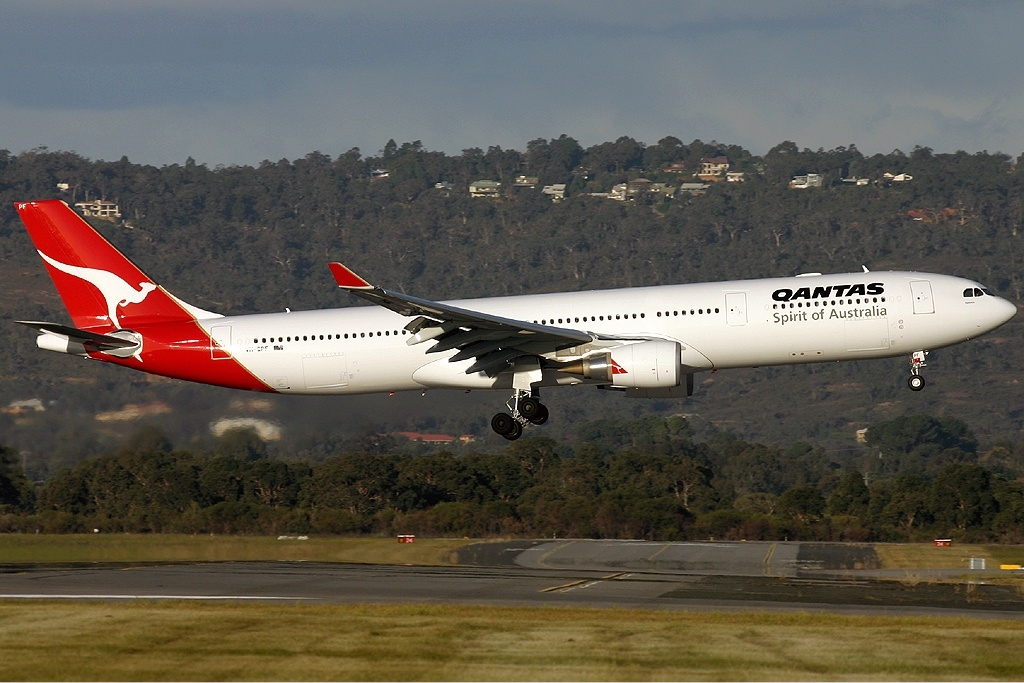
- A Qantas Airbus A330 at Perth Airport (2004)
- Date: 2011 (industrial action); 2012–2013 (settlements and arbitration)
- Location: Worldwide

The 2011 Qantas industrial disputes were a series of disputes between the Australian airline Qantas and three trade unions representing licensed aircraft engineers, long-haul pilots and ground staff. They arose from negotiations for new enterprise agreements, which began in 2010, and concerned pay, job security, outsourcing and the airline's plans to expand in Asia. Employees took protected industrial action during 2011; negotiations and arbitration continued into 2013.

On 29 October 2011, Qantas grounded its mainline fleet worldwide and announced a lockout of employees covered by the three disputes, scheduled to begin on 31 October. The grounding stranded passengers in Australia and overseas, while subsidiaries including Jetstar and QantasLink continued operating. Following an application by the federal government, Fair Work Australia terminated the industrial action at 2 am on 31 October, before the proposed lockout began. Qantas resumed flights later that day.

The grounding attracted criticism from passengers, unions and politicians, and majority disapproval in opinion polls. Qantas defended it as necessary to end prolonged disruption and protect the airline's viability. The disputes led to scrutiny of the airline's compensation arrangements, its safety justification for the grounding and the operation of Australia's industrial relations laws. The engineers' dispute was settled in January 2012, while subsequent arbitration rejected several of the ground staff and pilots' principal job-security claims.

== Background ==
Qantas began bargaining with the Australian Licensed Aircraft Engineers Association (ALAEA) and the Australian and International Pilots Association (AIPA) in August 2010, and with the Transport Workers Union of Australia (TWU) in May 2011. The three negotiations covered separate enterprise agreements.

Job security was a central issue. The engineers sought guarantees about maintenance work in Australia, including work on newer aircraft and conditions for subcontractors. The pilots sought to have Qantas-branded flying performed by Qantas pilots or pilots employed on equivalent conditions, including at subsidiaries. Qantas argued that extending its mainline employment conditions to other businesses would make some operations uncompetitive. The TWU sought limits on the use of contractors and equivalent employment conditions for contract workers.

=== Industrial action ===
Protected industrial action began in May 2011 and included work stoppages and overtime bans. In July, long-haul pilots voted for their first industrial action since 1966. Their campaign included announcements to passengers and departures from the uniform policy, rather than a general withdrawal of flying services. Engineers undertook rolling stoppages, while a four-hour ground staff strike on 20 September caused 28 cancellations and 27 delays, affecting about 6,100 passengers.

The parties disputed the extent to which union action required Qantas to cancel services. On 14 October the engineers' union announced that it was calling off industrial action and argued that planned cancellations should therefore be reversed. Qantas maintained that a maintenance backlog meant five aircraft would remain grounded. At its annual general meeting on 28 October, Qantas put the cost of industrial disruption to that date at A$68 million.

== Announcement of new strategy ==
On 16 August 2011, Qantas announced a restructuring of its international operations and plans to establish new airlines in Asia. The airline said that it would establish Jetstar Japan as a low-cost carrier, along with a premium carrier to be based at either Singapore or Kuala Lumpur. At the same time the airline announced there would be 1,000 job losses. Qantas said its international business needed a lower cost base; unions argued that the changes threatened Australian employment. Australian Council of Trade Unions secretary Jeff Lawrence described the announcement as one of the darkest days in the airline's history.

Executive remuneration also became a point of contention. Qantas reported that chief executive Alan Joyce's reported remuneration under accounting standards for 2010–11 was A$5.008 million, 71 per cent higher than in 2009–10. AIPA criticised the increase alongside the proposed job cuts; Qantas attributed much of the reported increase to the accounting treatment of deferred share awards.

== Grounding and employee lock-out ==
At a press conference on 29 October 2011, Joyce announced the immediate grounding of Qantas' mainline domestic and international fleet, effective from 5 pm AEDT. The company also gave notice of a lockout of employees covered by the three proposed agreements from 8 pm AEDT on 31 October. Joyce said that Qantas subsidiaries Jetstar Airways, QantasLink and Jetconnect would not be affected by the grounding, along with Express Freighters Australia and Atlas Air freight aircraft (operating on behalf of Qantas Freight and Australian airExpress).

Qantas said that the union claims would threaten its commercial viability and that continuing disruption was damaging bookings. It justified the immediate grounding, ahead of the proposed lockout, on safety grounds: management said that announcing the lockout could distract operational staff. Joyce defended the decision as necessary to bring the disputes to an end.

Flights that were in the air at the time of the announcement continued to their next destinations and were then grounded. The grounding affected 108 aircraft at 22 airports. Passengers were left seeking alternative flights and accommodation, including some who had already boarded aircraft. The Commonwealth Heads of Government Meeting taskforce said that 17 heads of government had been booked to leave Perth on Qantas flights. Qantas later told a Senate inquiry that approximately 98,000 passengers had been affected.

Qantas said it would reimburse accommodation costs for those left stranded by the fleet grounding, and refund those who were expected to fly with the airline. Virgin Australia offered stranded passengers a discount on flight fares. AirAsia X also offered special fares to affected passengers. Virgin also added capacity and sought assistance from partner airlines.

== Fair Work Australia orders ==
The federal workplace relations minister, Chris Evans, applied to Fair Work Australia under section 424 of the Fair Work Act 2009 to terminate or suspend the industrial action because of the threat to the economy. The hearing began on the evening of 29 October and continued the following day. The government elected not to use its powers under Section 431 of the Fair Work Act 2009, which enabled a minister to unilaterally make a declaration to terminate industrial action.

In the early hours of 31 October, a full bench of Fair Work Australia handed down orders that all protected industrial action taken by Qantas and the involved trade unions be terminated immediately. The tribunal considered that the unions' action, even taken together, was unlikely to cause significant damage to tourism or air transport. It found that Qantas' proposed response threatened such damage, and preferred termination to a temporary suspension because of the uncertainty and prospect of another lockout.

The order took effect at 2 am, preventing the lockout from commencing. It ended the protected industrial action without resolving the bargaining claims. The parties had 21 days to negotiate, with unresolved matters then subject to arbitration. After the Civil Aviation Safety Authority (CASA) approved Qantas' plan for restarting operations, flights resumed on the afternoon of 31 October.

== Impact and response ==
=== Political and union responses ===
Prime Minister Julia Gillard criticised the grounding as an extreme response and said that Qantas had other options. She said the government had been informed only hours before the announcement. Tony Abbott, then Leader of the Opposition, blamed the disputes on the government decision not to intervene, and said that the grounding was avoidable. Australian Senator Nick Xenophon criticised the action as "militant management".

TWU secretary Tony Sheldon accused Qantas of using a pre-planned grounding to mislead the public and workforce. Other union leaders condemned the disruption to passengers and employees. Joyce rejected claims that the grounding decision had been made in advance or was intended to force government intervention, while acknowledging that Qantas had considered contingency plans. The decision also attracted support: Qantas shares rose 4.5 per cent on 31 October, and analysts interviewed by ABC News argued that ending prolonged uncertainty could benefit the company.

=== Scrutiny of the decision ===
At a Senate hearing on 4 November, Joyce acknowledged that a possible lockout had been considered for weeks, but said that he had not disclosed the plan in earlier discussions with government or opposition politicians. He maintained that the decision was made on 29 October and denied deceiving the government. Journalist Matt O'Sullivan's 2015 book Mayday subsequently reported that managers had discussed a possible lockout in August and that detailed preparations for grounding preceded the final decision.

The Senate inquiry also examined the safety justification. CASA said it had not received the relevant safety case until after the grounding announcement and could not independently assess Qantas' reasoning without all the information available to the airline. It nevertheless recognised that grounding was an option available to an operator concerned about safety. The committee recommended requiring operators to submit a safety case before deciding to ground a fleet and considering penalties for unsupported safety claims. In a dissenting report, Xenophon and John Madigan argued that airlines should retain the ability to ground aircraft immediately, with the justification examined afterwards.

=== Public opinion and reputation ===
An Essential Research poll published on 7 November found that 53 per cent disapproved of the grounding and 35 per cent approved; regular air travellers were evenly divided, at 47 per cent each. In the same poll, 41 per cent blamed Qantas management, 20 per cent blamed workers and 31 per cent blamed both equally. A Fairfax/Nielsen poll reported on 14 November found 60 per cent disapproval and 36 per cent approval of the grounding. It also found more disapproval than approval of union industrial action, at 49 per cent against 41 per cent.

Roy Morgan Research reported a decline in Qantas customer satisfaction from 87 per cent in June 2011 to 84 per cent in November, while Virgin Australia's rating increased from 80 to 82 per cent. Qantas retained a small lead in that survey. On 6 November Qantas announced a free-flight offer for eligible disrupted passengers as part of its efforts to restore customer confidence.

On 22 November a Twitter competition using the hashtag #QantasLuxury attracted widespread mockery of the airline and its handling of the disputes. The promotion offered first-class pyjamas and amenity kits for descriptions of a luxury flight experience; many responses instead referred to the grounding and industrial conflict.

=== Financial impact and compensation ===
Qantas estimated that the disputes and grounding reduced its first-half 2011–12 result by A$194 million. Its breakdown comprised A$68 million from industrial action before the grounding, A$70 million from the grounding itself, A$27 million from lost forward bookings and A$29 million for customer recovery initiatives. The total therefore included the company's own grounding and subsequent recovery measures.

The Australian Competition and Consumer Commission (ACCC) considered Qantas' initial compensation arrangements inadequate. In December it welcomed the extension of refunds and compensation to all consumers affected by the grounding, including reasonable consequential losses. The ACCC also said its inquiries established that Qantas had continued selling tickets after the grounding for flights it knew it could not operate. It decided not to pursue the matter further because relatively few tickets were involved and those customers had been fully compensated, but asked the airline to review its systems.

== Settlement and subsequent proceedings ==
The parties did not reach agreements within the initial 21-day negotiation period. Qantas declined AIPA and TWU requests for a further 21 days of negotiation, and the disputes proceeded towards arbitration in November 2011.

=== Engineers ===
Qantas and the ALAEA reached a settlement in December 2011, which Fair Work Australia approved on 23 January 2012. It covered about 1,600 licensed engineers and provided a 3 per cent pay increase and changes to rostering, licensing and retirement arrangements. The pilots' and ground staff disputes remained unresolved.

Subsequent litigation concerned compliance with the engineers' 2012 workplace determination. In 2013 the Federal Circuit Court of Australia found that Qantas had failed to consult properly over a decision to make 30 engineers redundant and had failed to provide required information. It rejected the broader claim that introducing a new maintenance system itself breached the determination. On 28 October 2013 the court imposed penalties totalling A$41,250 for the two consultation breaches.

=== Ground staff ===
On 8 August 2012 Fair Work Australia rejected the TWU's proposed cap on contractors and its demand that contractors receive the same conditions as Qantas employees. It awarded 3 per cent annual pay increases, backdated to July 2011, rather than the 5 per cent sought by the union. The determination also provided consultation rights and an opportunity for employees to propose alternatives to outsourcing, and recorded Qantas' commitment to protect existing employees from compulsory redundancy resulting from outsourcing. The tribunal rejected allegations of bad-faith bargaining and did not find that either party's bargaining conduct had been unreasonable.

=== Pilots ===
On 10 May 2012 the Full Court of the Federal Court of Australia dismissed AIPA's challenge to the termination order. The association argued that its low-level action had not threatened the economy. The court accepted that the pilots' action should not itself have been terminated on that basis, but held that the valid termination of Qantas' action also removed protection from further pilot action over the same agreement. Justice Nye Perram considered Qantas' response to the pilots probably opportunistic, but concluded that this did not prevent it qualifying as employer response action under the Act.

On 17 January 2013 the tribunal, by then renamed the Fair Work Commission, issued its substantive decision in the pilots' arbitration. It rejected AIPA's principal job-security proposals, which sought to extend mainline pay and conditions to pilots flying Qantas-branded services for other Qantas Group businesses. The final workplace determination was made on 3 May 2013 after outstanding drafting issues were resolved.

== Assessments ==
Legal scholars Anthony Forsyth and Andrew Stewart described the dispute as a significant test of the Fair Work Act. They concluded that Qantas had largely succeeded in resisting restrictions on management's use of labour, while raising concerns about the implications of the strategy and the tribunal's approach for collective bargaining.

O'Sullivan argued in Mayday that the grounding damaged Qantas' relationships with employees, government and customers and encouraged some previously loyal passengers to try Virgin Australia. He also noted that most customers returned to Qantas. In Joe Aston's 2024 book The Chairman's Lounge, TWU official Michael Kaine argued that Qantas had escalated the dispute to trigger government intervention, while former TWU Victorian secretary Wayne Mader described the outcome as a lasting weakening of the union's industrial influence at the airline.
