= Hardie Grant =

Australian book publishing company

Hardie Grant is a media and book publishing company founded in 1997 and based in Melbourne, Australia. The company publishes books under the Hardie Grant and Hardie Grant Children's brands, as well as the Pantera Press and Ultimo Press imprints. It has offices in Collingwood (Melbourne), Sydney, Brisbane and San Francisco.

== Imprints ==
In 2020, Hardie Grant launched Ultimo Books, with offices in Sydney headed by former HarperCollins Australia CEO James Kellow.

In September 2024, Hardie Grant acquired independent Sydney-based publisher Pantera Press, which was founded by novelist and businessman John M. Green and his daughter Alison Green in 2008. In July 2026, Hardie Grant announced that future Pantera titles would be published under other Hardie Grant imprints and that Pantera staff would be departing the company.

== History and governance ==
Hardie Grant was founded in 1997 by Sandy Grant and Fiona Hardie. Grant was previously managing director of Heinemann and CEO of Reed Books and has been chair of the Australian Copyright Agency and president of the Australian Publishers Association. Hardie previously worked for Text Media. Hardie and Grant's son, Nick Hardie-Grant, was the CEO of the business as of April 2026.

In 2020, Hardie Grant staff became one of the first work forces in Australian book publishing to unionize through the Media, Entertainment and Arts Alliance. Hardie Grant management initially refused to negotiate with the union but entered enterprise bargaining negotiations after union members submitted an application to the Australian Fair Work Commission.

In 2022, Hardie Grant sold its UK operations, including the Quadrille imprint, to Penguin Random House, who rebranded the entire operation as Quadrille.

In 2023, Hardie Grant announced the introduction of a range of conditions not widely offered by other Australian publishers, including paid leave for staff experiencing menstruation, menopause, fertility treatment and gender transition treatment, as well as more flexible access to personal and carers' leave to recognise First Nations and other cultural definitions of kinship.

== Authors ==
Authors published by Hardie Grant and its imprints include Maxine Beneba Clarke, Adam Liaw, Matt Chun, Sally Rippin, Diana Reid, Thomas Mayo, Marcia Langton, Kasey Chambers, Romy Ash, Shaun Micallef, Em Rusciano, Fiona Wright, Yumna Kassab, Jaclyn Moriarty, Natalie Bassingthwaighte, Alan Joyce and Holden Sheppard.
