= Ali Imam (writer) =

Bangladeshi children's writer (1950–2022)

- আলী ইমাম
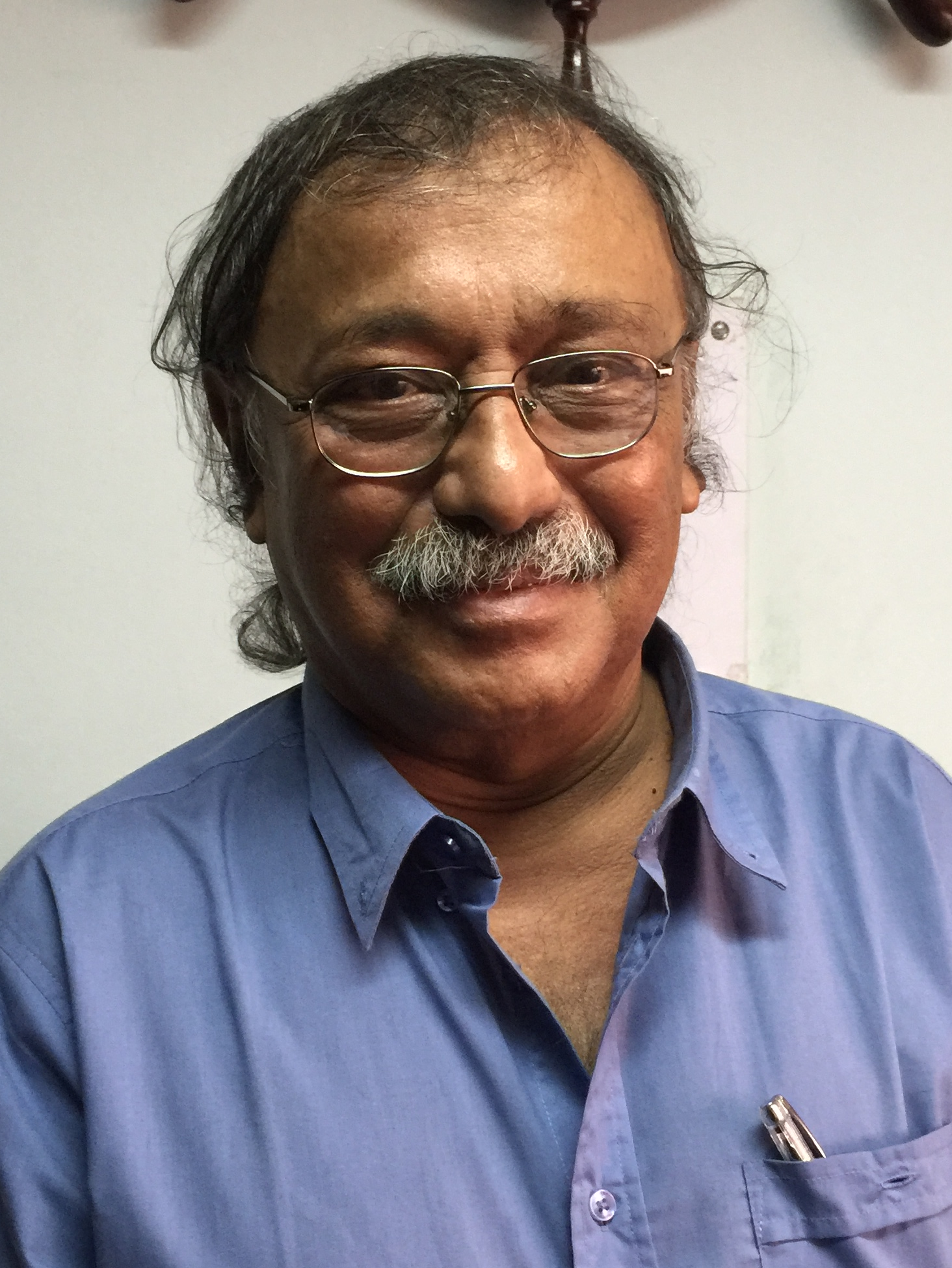
- Imam in 2018
- Born: 31 December 1950; Brahmanbaria, East Bengal, Pakistan, ( Present Bangladesh)
- Died: 21 November 2022 (aged 71); Bangladesh Medical College Hospital , Dhaka, Bangladesh.
- Occupations: Writer, Media personality
- Known for: Literature Work
- Awards: Bangla Academy Literary Award-2003 (Children's Literature)

Ali Imam (31 December 1950 – 21 November 2022) was a Bangladeshi children's writer and audio-visual organizer. He wrote many scientific stories, travel stories for children. He was awarded Bangla Academy Literary Award in 2001 in juvenile literature.

== Early life ==
Imam was born in Brahmanbaria on 31 December 1950. Six months after his birth, his whole family shifted to Dhaka. He spent his childhood in Nawabpur, Lincoln road, Thataribazar of Old Dhaka.

== Work ==
Imam wrote more than 630 books and translated nearly 40. Child psychology, humanism and adventure are found in his writing.

Imam was the general manager of Bangladesh Television and retired from the job in 2006.

== Personal life and death ==
Imam died on 21 November 2022, at the age of 71.
