= Omar Sakr =

Australian writer and poet (born 1989)

- Born: Western Sydney, New South Wales, Australia
- Occupations: Poet; novelist; essayist
- Website: omarsakr.com

Omar Sakr (born 22 November 1989) is an Australian poet, novelist, and essayist.

== Life ==
Sakr was born in Western Sydney to a Turkish father from Ceyhan and a Lebanese mother from Tripoli. He is Muslim. He attended Liverpool Boys High, received his Bachelor of Arts in communication from the University of Technology Sydney in 2010, and received his master's degree in creative writing from the University of Sydney in 2013.

Sakr is bisexual. In 2019, Sakr was part of the Big Anxiety festival, where he spoke of how he had experienced anxiety and depression as he navigated his sexuality in a religious household and how writing poetry had allowed him to channel his painful feelings into beautiful art.

== Career ==
Sakr has been a published poet since 2014, with over 80 poems appearing in literary journals including Meanjin, Overland, and other publications. His first book of poetry These Wild Houses was published in 2017 by Cordite Books.

In 2020, he was the first Arab-Australians Muslim to be shortlisted for and then win the Prime Minister's Literary Award for poetry for his book The Lost Arabs. The judging panel described The Lost Arabs as a collection of "vital, energy-driven poems" that "speak with a clear and fearless voice, a voice that is often passionate and sometimes angry, but always lucid and warmly human".

His first novel, Son of Sin, was published by Affirm Press in 2022. Rafqa Touma in The Guardian described in as "laced with charm, candor and a vital sense of warmth". Sakr's work has been translated into Arabic and Spanish. He was the poetry editor of The Lifted Brow from 2017 to 2020. In 2022, Sakr was named by The Australian as one of the top 100 cultural leaders in the arts. His latest poetry collection, Non-Essential Work, was published by University of Queensland Press in 2023.

On 10 December 2024, Sakr was announced as the Australian Greens candidate for the Division of Blaxland at the 2025 Australian federal election.

== State Library Victoria controversy ==
In 2024, Sakr was scheduled to appear at the State Library Victoria's Teen Writing Bootcamp series alongside Alison Evans, Amie Kaufman, Ariel Slamet Ries, Morgan Rose, and Jinghua Qian. On 28 February, two days before Sakr's scheduled appearance on 1 March, the entire program was cancelled by the library, which cited that a "child and cultural safety" review was necessary. Public speculation followed that public support of Palestine by Sakr and three other authors was the actual reason for the cancellation, claims that were supported by numerous State Library Victoria staff. Internal emails relating to the incident, obtained under the Freedom of Information Act, later confirmed that the State Library Victoria had indeed scrutinised the political and religious views of the authors on various topics, especially Palestine, when making the decision to cancel the workshops. One employee had raised concerns that Sakr, as a Muslim, should not be paired with a Jewish writer.

== Awards ==
Year	Nominated work	Award	Category	Result	Ref.
2017	These Wild Houses	Anne Elder Award		Commended	
2017	These Wild Houses	Queensland Premier's Literary Awards	Judith Wright Calanthe Award	Shortlisted	
2018	These Wild Houses	New South Wales Premier's Literary Awards	Kenneth Slessor Prize for Poetry	Shortlisted	
2019		Edward Stanley Award for Poetry		Winner	
2019	The Lost Arabs	Queensland Premier's Literary Awards	Judith Wright Calanthe Award	Shortlisted	
2020	The Lost Arabs	Colin Roderick Award		Shortlisted	
2020	The Lost Arabs	New South Wales Premier's Literary Awards	Multicultural NSW Award	Shortlisted	
2020	The Lost Arabs	Adelaide Festival Awards for Literature	John Bray Poetry Award	Shortlisted	
2020	The Lost Arabs	Prime Minister's Literary Awards	Poetry	Winner	
2020	"Where Am I Not"	Woollahra Digital Literary Award	Poetry	Winner	
2023	Son of Sin	Indie Book Awards	Debut Fiction	Shortlisted	
2024	Non-Essential Work	New South Wales Premier's Literary Awards	Kenneth Slessor Prize for Poetry	Shortlisted	
2024	Non-Essential Work	ALS Gold Medal		Shortlisted	
2026	The Nightmare Sequence	ALS Gold Medal		Shortlisted	

== Works ==
=== Books ===
- The Nightmare Sequence, illustrated by Safdar Ahmed (University of Queensland Press, 2025)
- Non-Essential Work (University of Queensland Press, 2023)
- Son of Sin (Affirm Press, 2022)
- The Lost Arabs (University of Queensland Press, 2019)
- These Wild Houses (Cordite Books, 2017)

=== Short stories ===
- “White Flu” in After Australia (Affirm Press, 2020)
- “An Arab Werewolf” in Kindred: 12 Queer #LoveOzYA Stories (Walker Books, 2019)
