= Transport Workers' Union of Australia =

Trade union

- Founded: 1906
- Headquarters: Sydney
- Location: Australia
- Members: ▲58,885 (as at 31 December 2024)
- Key people: Michael Kaine, National Secretary; Nick McIntosh, Assistant National Secretary
- Affiliations: ACTU, ITF, ALP
- Website: www.twu.com.au

The Transport Workers' Union of Australia (TWU) is a trade union representing workers in various transport sectors. It has five main branches, covering the Australian Capital Territory/New South Wales, Queensland, Victoria/Tasmania, South Australia/Northern Territory, and Western Australia. The TWU's primary focus areas include road transport, commercial aviation, and more recently, gig economy workers.

The TWU is a progressive union based on the organising model. The TWU is affiliated with the Australian Council of Trade Unions and the International Transport Workers' Federation. In South Australia, Queensland and New South Wales, the union is affiliated with the Labor Right. The TWU is considered to be one of the most powerful unions in the Labor Right faction of the Australian Labor Party.

The history of the Transport Workers' Union is partly a story of the technological and economic changes to the ways people and goods have been transported across the history of Australia. Its main beliefs are that the free market cannot be relied upon to create a safe, efficient and viable transport industry, and that transport workers should stand together to strive for better pay and conditions.

== History ==
=== Background ===
In the 1880s, small independent unions of drivers sprang up in the colonies of Australia. Many of these unions were short-lived. It was an extremely competitive industry. A self-employed carrier could set himself up with a basic horse and cart for a relatively small sum of money, and drivers, too, were in chronic oversupply. Conditions were poor and wage-earning drivers worked very long hours for low rates of pay. Much of the available work was casual and seasonal.

After the turn of the century, small specialised transport unions were established throughout Australia. These included separate unions of milk carters, bread carters, and fuel and fodder carters. Numbers of wage-earning drivers increased in the major cities during this period as carrying firms grew in size, stimulated by growth in manufacturing. Wharves and railway depots were also important sources of work for drivers. By 1903 it was reported that work had become more stable and less casual. However, conditions were still poor. Drivers could be expected to work up to 19 hours a day. Wages were generally between 25 and 35 shillings a week.

=== Early history ===
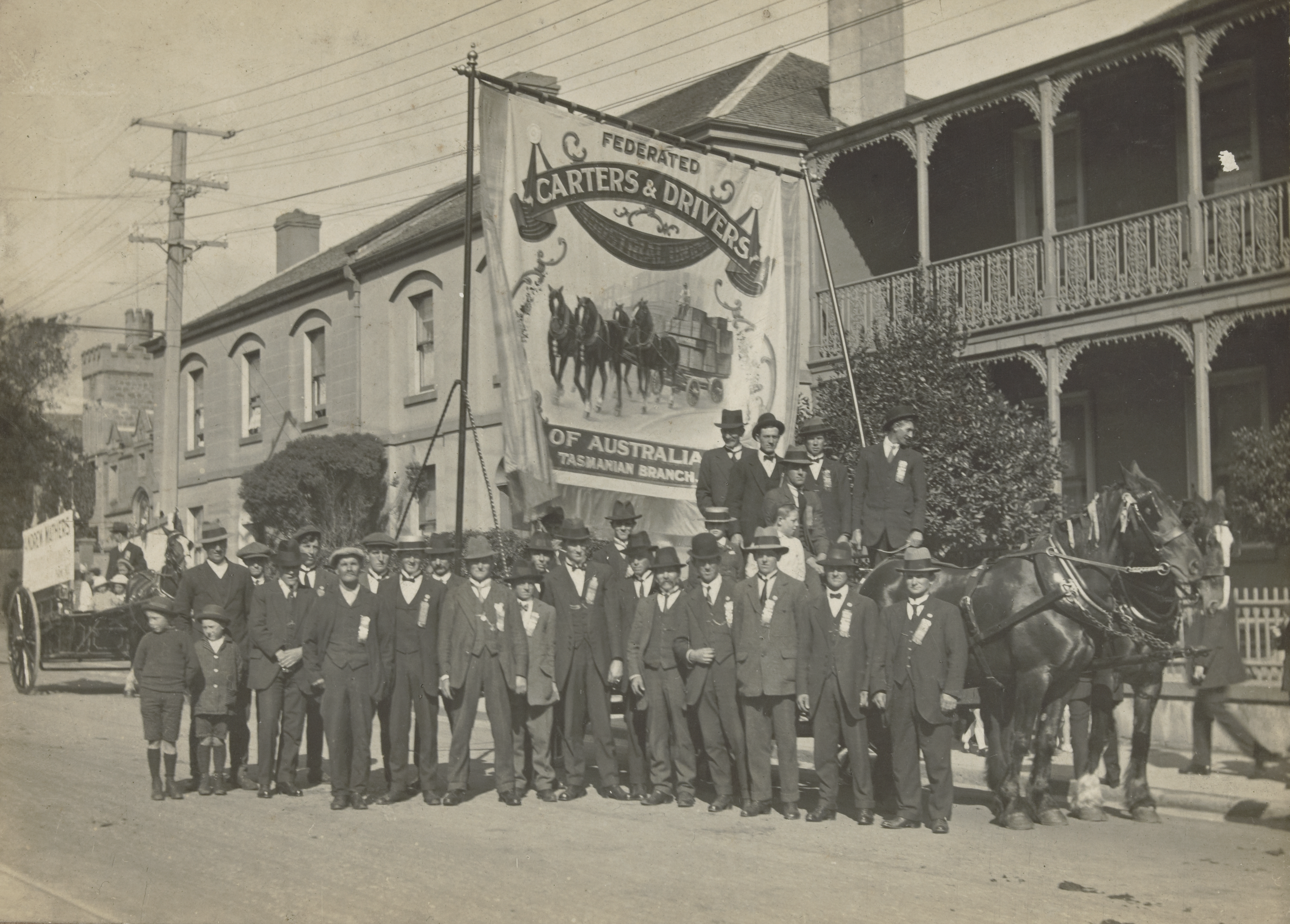
Members of the Tasmanian branch of the Federated Carters and Drivers Union at an Eight-Hour-Day Parade, circa 1920.

Growth in the transport sector provided a stimulus for carters' unions to reorganise themselves to make them a stronger force. This led to the federal registration of the Federated Carters and Drivers' Industrial Union in 1906. This union is the direct predecessor of today's TWU.

While other parts of the economy experienced difficult times in the years 1914–1939, rapid technological change made road transport a dynamic and rapidly expanding industry. There was an explosion in numbers of commercial motor vehicles in Australia during the 1920s. Advances in truck construction and decreasing costs made road transport a serious competitor to the railways for the first time. These changes put the union in a stronger position to fight for shorter working hours and other improved conditions. However, the union itself had to adapt and make the transition from the horse-drawn era to the new world of trucks and cars.

In 1925, representatives of the Federated Carters and Drivers' Industrial Union, the Trolley, Draymen and Carters' Union and the Motor Transport and Chauffeurs' Association met to plan the establishment of a new union capable of representing all persons employed in connection with the transport of people or goods by road. This led to the Amalgamated Road Transport Workers Union becoming federally registered in 1928.

Despite these attempts to create a stronger organisation, the Great Depression hit the union hard. The Queensland branch survived the depression best. Yet even there, award conditions couldn't survive the pressure of mass unemployment. It was estimated that many workers had their conditions returned to those of the 1880s. In Victoria casual employment had again become the norm with gangs of men waiting outside yards all day trying to get work by the hour.

=== Recovery and growth ===
The road transport sector picked up again after the depression. During this period the union's strongest sector was among oil company drivers. In 1937 these drivers were the first in the union to win a week's annual leave—benefits which flowed on to the wider membership in 1940.

In 1937 the union was granted the right to cover persons engaged in connection with the transport of passengers or freight by air as well as by road. These members—particularly baggage handlers and porters—quickly became a key sector within the Union. Their bargaining power won improvements in pay and conditions which in turn benefited union members in other sectors. To reflect the change in coverage, in 1938 the union adopted its current name, the Transport Workers' Union of Australia. World War II saw major changes within the road transport industry, with acute labour shortages resulting in long hours and high wages for drivers. After the war the road transport industry was rationalised as smaller operators were forced out of the business by larger, more efficient firms. These larger companies introduced new methods of work, using specialised bulk tankers, forklifts and pallets to lower costs and increase productivity.

The road transport industry grew strongly after the war and the sophistication and size of trucks increased. By the end of the 1960s, large articulated trucks accounted for 56% of all tonne-kilometres performed by road transport. By this time waves of takeovers had reorganised the industry with small local firms being taken over by large national transport companies. By 1966 five conglomerates dominated the industry – Ansett Transport Industries, Thomas Nationwide Transport, Mayne Nickless, Brambles Limited and Alltrans/Comet. This rationalisation meant that the union also had to reorganise itself into a strong federal body, capable of operating in a nationally co-ordinated way.

=== Enlargement and problems ===
In the early 1960s drivers won substantial wage increases as the Commonwealth Conciliation and Arbitration Commission recognised the changing nature of drivers' work in the road transport industry. Heavier loads, the increased use of high-powered, multi-axled articulated vehicles, and the higher levels of skill and productivity required of drivers led to labour shortages and provided the opportunity for the TWU to win large wage increases.

Seeking to minimise their costs, many large companies increased their use of owner drivers to avoid paying award rates of pay to employee drivers. These subcontractors increasingly discovered they lacked the bargaining power of employee drivers. Forced to negotiate individually with the large prime contractors, they found themselves progressively squeezed throughout the late 1960s and early 1970s as operating costs rose far more than rates. For the first time since the 1880s, owner drivers joined the union in large numbers. They had quickly found the TWU was the only serious industrial force that could stand up to the transport conglomerates.

From the early 1970s, the TWU became a cohesive, centrally directed force with a substantial presence, actively recruiting members and training job delegates. The early 1980s were a time of strong gains in wages and the TWU was for a time the pacesetter, gaining higher wage increases for its members than any other union.

Ground was lost, however, as the recession of 1982–83 took hold. This downturn stimulated a major restructuring of the Australian transport industry as retailers and manufacturers turned to a system of contract distribution rather than maintain their own truck fleets or engage owner drivers. Contract distribution involved total responsibility for the pick-up, warehousing, distribution and delivery of goods.

Large companies used economies of scale, mechanised and computerised warehouses and close control of their workforce, to reduce costs and the number of employees and vehicles required. Restructuring such as this has led to considerable changes to the work of employee drivers.

In 1987 the TWU amalgamated with Motor Transport and Chauffeurs Association, which gave the union coverage of the private bus industry in Victoria.

=== Recent history ===
When the conservative Howard government came into power in 1996, the TWU faced new challenges. The focus of membership retention turned to a more organising focus as compulsory membership was made illegal under the Workplace Relations Act 1996. Before this time, union members and organisers could pressure non-union truck drivers against entering union-dominated workplaces.

Membership declined rapidly, but picked up in following years—almost every state increasing membership by 2004. Targeted recruitment and retention campaigns proved successful for the union, as well as increased co-operation between state branches.

In 2006, Federal Secretary John Allan resigned. He was replaced by NSW Secretary Tony Sheldon as Acting Federal Secretary. The head office location was moved from Melbourne to Sydney.

National Secretary Sheldon led the union to success in the 'Safe Rates' campaign with the passing of legislation to establish the Road Safety Remuneration Tribunal in 2012. The union continues industrial action in the wake of the 2011 Qantas industrial disputes.

A health and safety representative at Qantas Ground Services, Theo Seremetidis, was stood down in February 2020 after directing colleagues to stop cleaning aircraft arriving from China over concerns about exposure to COVID-19; he was later among the workers made redundant in the outsourcing. SafeWork NSW prosecuted the company under the discriminatory-conduct provisions of the Work Health and Safety Act 2011 (NSW), the first charges the regulator had brought under those provisions. Qantas Ground Services was found guilty in November 2023 and in March 2024 was convicted and fined A$250,000, with a further A$21,000 in compensation to Seremetidis. TWU national secretary Michael Kaine described the outcome as a victory for workers and for health and safety representatives.

In 2021, the Transport Workers Union took Qantas to court over the dismissal of 1685 baggage handlers and cleaners during the COVID-19 pandemic, whose roles were later outsourced. The TWU argued that the airline’s actions contravened the Fair Work Act, while Qantas claimed it had to make the cuts to ensure the company's survival during the pandemic. In July 2021, the Federal Court of Australia ruled in favour of the TWU, with Qantas losing an appeal in May 2022, before the case moved to the High Court of Australia in May 2023. In September 2023, in Qantas Airways Ltd v Transport Workers' Union of Australia, the High Court unanimously dismissed Qantas's appeal, holding that the Fair Work Act's prohibition on adverse action extends to action taken to prevent the exercise of a workplace right that might arise in the future, and leaving the airline liable for compensation.

After the High Court's decision the proceeding returned to the Federal Court for the assessment of compensation and penalties. In October 2024 Justice Michael Lee determined compensation for non-economic loss in three test cases, and in December 2024 Qantas and the TWU agreed to a A$120 million pool to compensate the affected workers. On 18 August 2025 the Federal Court ordered Qantas to pay a pecuniary penalty of A$90 million, against a maximum available penalty of about A$121 million; legal commentators described it as the largest civil penalty imposed for a breach of the Fair Work Act. A$50 million of the penalty was ordered to be paid to the TWU, Lee citing the cost and risk the union had borne in bringing the proceeding, with the remaining A$40 million reserved for later orders; the union said it would apply the money to advancing transport workers' pay, conditions and welfare. Qantas said it accepted the decision, and chief executive Vanessa Hudson apologised to the 1,820 ground handling employees affected. In December 2025 the court ordered that the remaining A$40 million also be paid to the affected workers, with interim payments made before Christmas, and in August 2026, after delays in administering the scheme, it ordered the balance still held by the court, about A$38 million, to be released to them.

== Industries covered ==
The union has coverage throughout 47 sectors of the transport industry including:

- Road transport (passenger and freight)
- Aviation (ground services, catering, guest services, cabin crew, pilots, airfreight and cargo, refuellers)
- Oil, fuel and gas
- Armoured vehicle drivers, guards and staff
- Waste and recycling industry workers
- Forklift drivers and dock hands
- Clerical staff in the transport industry
- Bus and coach drivers
- On-demand rideshare and food delivery riders and drivers

Whilst technically having wide coverage, the TWU largely focuses on road transport, warehouse distribution, airline operations, bus drivers and the waste industry.

The TWU's coverage of gas industry staff extends from its amalgamation with The Federated Gas Employees Industrial Union (FGEIU) in 1997. South Australia is the only state to have an extensive membership in this industry as it was the base of the FGIEU. It is the only state to have a gas industry sub-branch.

== Bibliography ==
- Bowden, Bradley (1993). Driving Force: The History of the Transport Workers' Union of Australia 1883–1992. Sydney: Allen & Unwin. ISBN 978-1-86373-381-6.
- Bray, Mark; Rimmer, Malcolm (1987). Delivering the Goods: A History of the NSW Transport Workers Union 1898–1986. Sydney: Allen & Unwin.
- Kellett, John (2001). A Fighting Union: A History of the Queensland Branch of the Transport Workers' Union, 1907–2000. Queensland.
- TWU NSW Branch. Proud To Be A TWU Member: Transport Workers Tell Their Stories, 1999
