= Vanessa Hudson (executive) =

Australian businesswoman and Qantas executive (born 1970)

Vanessa Hudson FCA
- Born: Vanessa Hudson; 1969 or 1970 (age 56–57); Sydney, New South Wales, Australia
- Education: Pymble Ladies' College
- Alma mater: University of Technology Sydney (UTS)
- Occupation: Business executive
- Known for: First female CEO of Qantas
- Children: 2

Vanessa Hudson (born 1969 or 1970) is an Australian business executive and CEO of Qantas. She became Qantas CEO in September 2023, succeeding Alan Joyce after his abrupt resignation.

== Early life and education ==
Hudson grew up in Northern Sydney. She attended and matriculated at Pymble Ladies' College in 1986. She later graduated from the University of Technology Sydney in 1991 with a Bachelor of Business (BBus). In 1994, she was admitted as a Member of the Institute of Chartered Accountants Australia and later becoming a fellow of the institute (FCA).

== Career ==
Hudson began her career in external audits at Deloitte Touche Tohmatsu for two years, before joining Qantas in 1994 as an internal audit supervisor. Then she became finance controller in the commercial division of Qantas. In 1997, she was appointed as the catering product manager. She was named executive manager of product and services in 2005. As Qantas's executive manager of commercial planning, Hudson was called as a witness at an emergency Fair Work Australia hearing into the 2011 Qantas industrial disputes.

Hudson relocated to Los Angeles in 2013 when she was named the senior vice-president of the American arm of Qantas. She returned to Australia in 2016 after becoming the company's executive manager of sales and distribution. In 2018, Hudson was one of the judges to help name the Australian Financial Review "100 Women of Influence".

In February 2018, she was appointed as chief customer officer of Qantas Group, then becoming the chief financial officer. As CFO, Hudson was involved in a number of matters at Qantas, including Perth Airport's legal action against the airline in 2018, which was ultimately resolved in the Supreme Court of Western Australia. She was also CFO during the COVID-19 pandemic and the Russian invasion of Ukraine, both of which affected global oil prices and prompted the airline to implement a hedging strategy. In May 2023, it was announced that Hudson would succeed Alan Joyce as the chief executive officer of Qantas, becoming the first woman to lead the company.

Her official appointment as Qantas CEO was initially set to occur at the conclusion of Joyce's 15-year tenure at the annual general meeting in November 2023, although her appointment was expedited following Joyce's early departure in September. On 5 September 2023, it was announced Joyce would quit early following revelations the company may have continued to sell tickets for flights that had already been cancelled, with Hudson taking over the following day.

She was named in the Fortune's list of Most Powerful Women in 2023.

== Personal life ==
Hudson is married and has two adult daughters.

Business positions
Preceded by Alan Joyce	CEO of Qantas; 2023–present	Incumbent
